= Index of Falkland Islands–related articles =

Duplicate: List of Falkland Islands–related topics

The location of the British Overseas Territory of the Falkland Islands

The following is an alphabetical list of topics related to the British Overseas Territory of the Falkland Islands.

== 0–9 ==
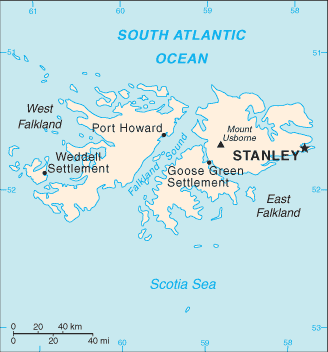
A map of the Falkland Islands

- .fk – Internet country code top-level domain for the Falkland Islands
- 1966 Aerolineas Argentinas DC-4 hijacking
- 1982 invasion of the Falkland Islands
- 1982 Liberation Memorial
- COVID-19 pandemic in the Falkland Islands

== A ==
- Aerospatiale SS.12/AS.12
- Ajax Bay
- Alan Huckle
- Americas
  - South America
    - South Atlantic Ocean
      - Falkland Islands
- Anglo-America
- Antonio Rivero
- Anthony Cary, 5th Viscount of Falkland
- ARA Almirante Domecq Garcia (D23)
- ARA Almirante Irízar (Q-5)
- ARA Bahía Buen Suceso
- ARA General Belgrano
- ARA Isla de los Estados
- ARA San Luis
- ARA Santa Fe
- Argentine air forces in the Falklands War
- Argentine ground forces in the Falklands War
- Argentine names for the Falkland Islands
- Argentine naval forces in the Falklands War
- Arnold Weinholt Hodson
- Ascension Island
- Atlantic Conveyor
- Atlantic Ocean
- Atlas of the Falkland Islands

== B ==
- Barren Island (Falkland Islands)
- Battle of Goose Green
- Battle of Mount Harriet
- Battle of Mount Longdon
- Battle of Mount Tumbledown
- Battle of the Falkland Islands, a naval engagement during World War I
- Battle of Two Sisters
- Battle of Wireless Ridge
- Beauchene Island
- Beaver Island (Falkland Islands)
- Bishop of the Falkland Islands
- Black-necked swan
- Bleaker Island
- Bodie Suspension Bridge
- British air services in the Falklands War
- British Forces Broadcasting Service
- British ground forces in the Falklands War
- British Nationality (Falkland Islands) Act 1983
- British naval forces in the Falklands War
- British Overseas Territory of the Falkland Islands
- Byron Sound

== C ==
- Calm Head
- Camp (Falkland Islands)
- Camp (constituency)
- Cape Meredith
- Capital of the Falkland Islands: Stanley on East Falkland
- Carcass Island
- Casualties of the Battle of Bluff Cove
- Categories:
  - Category:Falkland Islands
    - Category:Buildings and structures in the Falkland Islands
    - Category:Communications in the Falkland Islands
    - Category:Economy of the Falkland Islands
    - Category:Education in the Falkland Islands
    - Category:Environment of the Falkland Islands
    - Category:Falkland Islands people
    - Category:Falkland Islands stubs
    - Category:Falkland Islands-related lists
    - Category:Geography of the Falkland Islands
    - Category:Government of the Falkland Islands
    - Category:History of the Falkland Islands
    - Category:Military of the Falkland Islands
    - Category:Politics of the Falkland Islands
    - Category:Sport in the Falkland Islands
    - Category:Transport in the Falkland Islands
  - commons:Category:Falkland Islands
- Catholic Church in the Falkland Islands
- Chartres River
- Choiseul Sound
- Chris Simpkins
- Christ Church Cathedral (Falkland Islands)
- Cities in the Falkland Islands
- Coat of arms of the Falkland Islands
- Coins of the Falkland Islands pound
- Colin Roberts (diplomat)
- Commonwealth of Nations
- Communications in the Falkland Islands
- Cultural impact of the Falklands War
- Culture of the Falkland Islands

== D ==
- Darwin, Falkland Islands
- Demographics of the Falkland Islands
- Desire the Right Party

== E ==
- East Falkland
- Economy of the Falkland Islands
- Elinor Frances Vallentin
- Engle Passage
- English colonization of the Americas
- English language
- Escuadrón Fénix
- Events leading to the Falklands War
- Ewen Southby-Tailyour
- Executive Council of the Falkland Islands

== F ==
- Falklands Conservation
- Falklands Day
- Falkland, adjective
- Falkland Island, adjective
- Falkland Island fox
- Falkland Islander, citizen of the Falkland Islands
- Falkland Islands
- Falkland Islands Association
- Falkland Islands at the 2006 Commonwealth Games
- Falkland Islands at the Commonwealth Games
- Falkland Islands Community School
- Falkland Islands Company
- Falkland Islands Defence Force
- Falkland Islands Dependencies Survey
- Falkland Islands Gazette
- Falkland Islands General Employees Union
- Falkland Islands Holdings
- Falkland Islands Football League
- Falkland Islands Magazine
- Falkland Islands Museum and National Trust
- Falkland Islands national badminton team
- Falkland Islands national cricket team
- Falkland Islands national football team
- Falkland Islands placenames
- Falkland Islands pound
- The Falklands Play
- Falkland Islands Radio Service
- Falkland Islands Rifle Association
- Falkland Sound
- Falklands War (1982)
- Flag of the Falkland Islands
- Fox Bay

== G ==
- Gavin Short
- Geography of the Falkland Islands
- Geology of the Falkland Islands
- George Island
- George Rennie (sculptor and politician)
- Golding Island
- Goose Green
- Government House, Falkland Islands
- Governor of the Falkland Islands
- Gran Malvina
- Grand Jason Island
- Gypsy Cove

== H ==
- H. Jones
- Harrier Attack
- Hill Cove
- History of South Georgia and the South Sandwich Islands
- History of the Falkland Islands
- HMS Antelope (F170)
- HMS Ardent (F184)
- HMS Cardiff (D108)
- HMS Coventry (D118)
- HMS Endurance (1967)
- HMS Exeter (D89)
- HMS Glamorgan (D19)
- HMS Glasgow (D88)
- HMS Sheffield (D80)
- Hornsby Mountains
- Hoste Inlet
- Howard Pearce

== I ==
- Ian John McKay
- International Organization for Standardization (ISO)
  - ISO 3166-1 alpha-2 country code for the Falkland Islands: FK
  - ISO 3166-1 alpha-3 country code for the Falkland Islands: FLK
- Isla Soledad
- Islands of the Falkland Islands
  - East Falkland
  - West Falkland

== J ==
- Jack's Mountain
- Jane Cameron National Archives
- Jason Islands
- John Middleton (administrator)
- Johnson's Harbour
- Jorge Anaya

== K ==
- Keppel Island
- Keppel Sound
- King George Bay

== L ==
- Lafonia (peninsula)
- Landmines in the Falkland Islands
- Legislative Assembly of the Falkland Islands
- Legislative Council of the Falkland Islands
- Leopoldo Galtieri
- Liberation Day (Falkland Islands)
- Lists related to the Falkland Islands:
  - List of Argentine names for the Falkland Islands
  - List of cities in the Falkland Islands
  - List of Falkland Islands by-elections
  - List of Falkland Islands placenames
  - List of Falkland Islands-related topics
  - List of islands of the Falkland Islands
  - Listed buildings in the Falkland Islands
  - List of rivers of the Falkland Islands
  - List of settlements in the Falkland Islands
  - List of valleys of the Falkland Islands
  - Topic outline of the Falkland Islands
- Lively Island
- Louis Baillon
- Luis Vernet

== M ==
- MacBride Head
- Margaret Thatcher
- Marion Island
- Max Hastings
- Mike Rendell
- Military of the Falkland Islands
- Mount Maria
- Mount Usborne
- Murrell River

== N ==
- New Island
- Nigel Haywood
- Nigel Phillips
- No 6 mine
- Norland

== O ==
- Occupation of the Falkland Islands
- Oerlikon 35 mm twin cannon
- Operation Algeciras
- Operation Azul
- Operation Black Buck
- Operation Corporate
- Operation Journeyman
- Operation Keyhole
- Operation Paraquet
- Operation Purple Warrior
- Operation Rosario
- Operation Sutton
- Origins of Falkland Islanders

== P ==
- Passage Islands
- Peat Cutting Monday
- Pebble Island
- Penguin News
- Peter Carington, 6th Baron Carrington
- Placenames in the Falkland Islands
- Politics of the Falkland Islands
- Port Albemarle
- Port Egmont
- Port Howard
- Port Louis, Falkland Islands
- Port San Carlos
- Port Stanley Airport
- Port Stephens
- Postage stamps and postal history of the Falkland Islands
- Public holidays in the Falkland Islands
- Puerto Soledad

== Q ==
- Quaker Harbour
- Quaker Island, Falkland Islands

== R ==
- RAF Mount Pleasant
- Re-establishment of British rule on the Falklands (1833)
- Religion in the Falkland Islands
- Revenue stamps of the Falkland Islands
- Rex Masterman Hunt
- Richard Cockwell
- Richard Stevens (Falkland Islands politician)
- Rivers of the Falkland Islands
- Roger Edwards (politician)
- Roger Goldsworthy (colonial administrator)
- Roman Catholicism in the Falkland Islands
- Roy Cove
- Rugby union in the Falkland Islands

== S ==
- Salvador Settlement
- San Carlos, Falkland Islands
- Sandy Woodward
- Saunders Island (Falkland Islands)
- Scouting in the Falkland Islands
- Sea Lion Island
- Settlements in the Falkland Islands
- 'Sharkey' Ward
- Simon Weston
- South Atlantic Ocean
- Southern Hemisphere
- Sovereignty of the Falkland Islands
- Speedwell Island
- Staats Island
- Stamps and postal history of the Falkland Islands
- Stanley (constituency)
- Stanley on East Falkland – Capital of the Falkland Islands
- Steeple Jason Island
- Stephen Venner
- Stone run
- Storm Mountain
- Swan Islands

== T ==
- Tam Dalyell
- Template:Falkland Islands topics
- Teslyn Barkman
- The Falkland Islands Journal
- Timeline of the history of the Falkland Islands
- Topic outline of the Falkland Islands
- Transport in the Falkland Islands
- Tumbledown

== U ==
- United Kingdom of Great Britain and Northern Ireland
- USS Salish (ATA-187)

== V ==
- Valleys in the Falkland Islands
- Volunteer Point

== W ==
- Walker Creek
- Warrah River
- Weapons of the Falklands War
- Weddell Island
- West Falkland
- West Point Island
- Western Hemisphere
- Wickham Heights
- Wikimedia Atlas of the Falkland Islands
- Wikipedia:WikiProject Topic outline/Drafts/Topic outline of the Falkland Islands
- William Cleaver Francis Robinson
- William Lamond Allardyce

== See also ==
- List of international rankings
- Lists of country-related topics
- Topic outline of geography
- Topic outline of South America
- Topic outline of the Falkland Islands
