= Geography of the Falkland Islands =

Falkland Islands
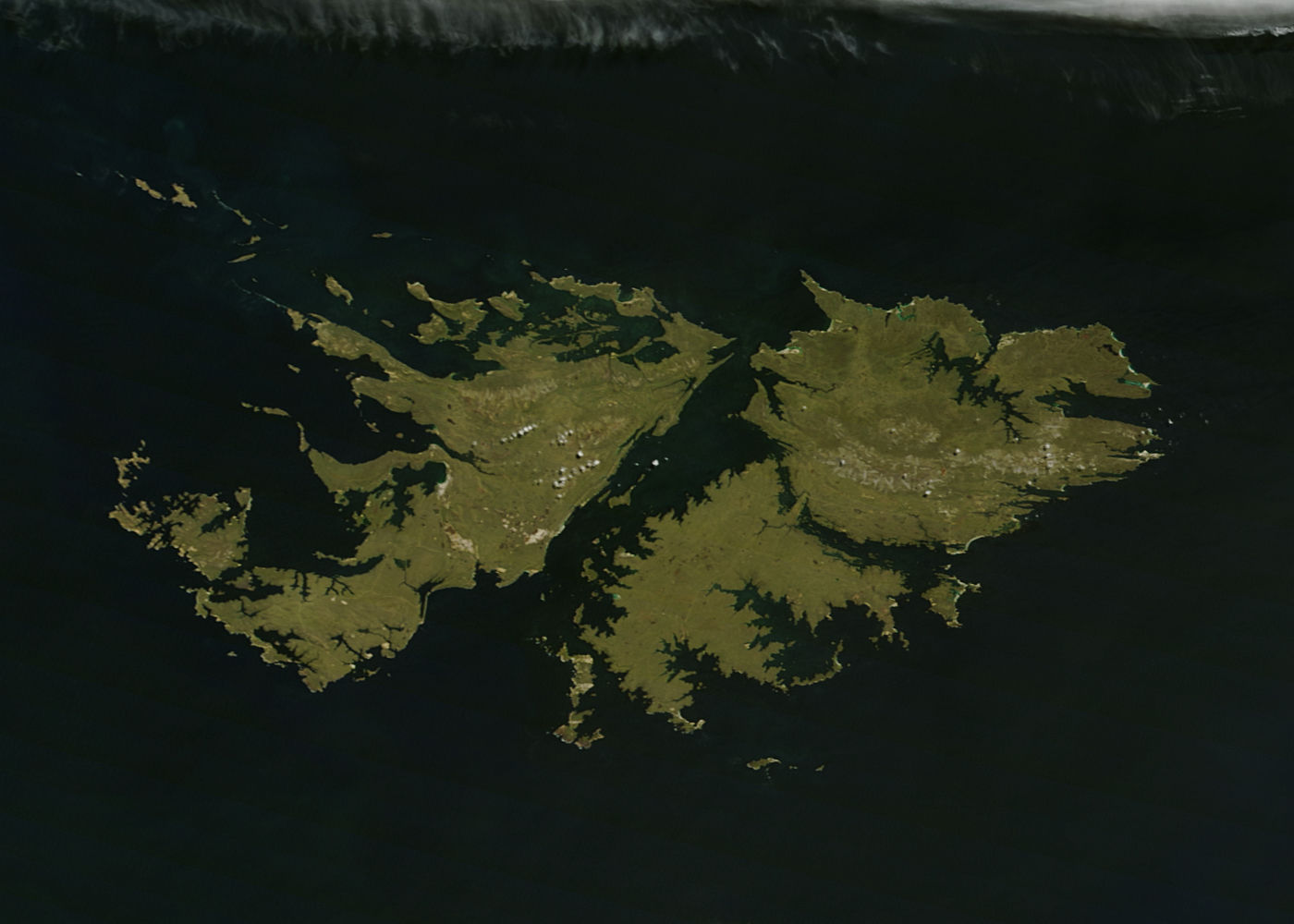
- Satellite image of the Falkland Islands

Geography
- Coordinates: 51°41′S 59°10′W
- Adjacent to: South Atlantic
- Total islands: 778
- Area: 12,200 km^{2} (4,700 sq mi)
- Highest elevation: 705 m (2313 ft)
- Highest point: Mount Usborne

Administration
- British Overseas Territory of the Falkland Islands (UK)
- Capital and largest settlement: Stanley

Demographics
- Population: 3,662
- Pop. density: 0.24/km^{2} (0.62/sq mi)

Additional information
- Time zone: FKST (UTC-3)

The Falkland Islands are located in the South Atlantic Ocean between 51°S and 53°S on a projection of the Patagonian Shelf, part of the South American continental shelf. In ancient geological time this shelf was part of Gondwana, and around 400 million years ago split from what is now Africa and drifted westwards from it. Today the islands are subjected to the Roaring Forties, winds that shape both their geography and climate.

The Falklands comprise two main islands, West Falkland and East Falkland, and about 776 small islands.

== Geology ==
The geological history of the Falkland Islands began during the Precambrian era more than 1 billion years ago, when Proterozoic granites and gneisses were laid down in Gondwana. These rocks became part of the Cape Meredith/ formation and outcrop at the Cape. During Siluro-Devonian times, these rocks were overlain with quartzose and subarkosic sandstones with some siltstone and mudstone, rocks that are particularly erosion- and weather-resistant, giving these parts of the islands a rugged landscape and coastline.

Location of the Falkland Islands in Gondwana

Tectonic forces continued to form the region: a mountain chain formed, part of which now creates Wickham Heights on East Falkland Island and extends westwards through West Falkland into the Jason Islands. A basin developed and was filled with land-based, or terrigenous, sediments. These layers of sand and mud filled the basin as it sank and as they hardened they produced the rocks of the sedimentary Lafonia Group of the Falklands. These rocks are similar to those in southern Africa's Karoo basin.

About 290 million years ago, in the Carboniferous period, an ice age engulfed the area as glaciers advanced from the polar region eroding and transporting rocks. These rocks were deposited as extensive moraines and glacial till, or they sank in the sea while the glacier floated in a layer of ice. When the glacial sediments were turned into stone they formed the rocks that now make up the Fitzroy Tillite Formation in the Falklands. Identical rocks are found in southern Africa.

During the break-up of Gondwana and the formation of the Atlantic Ocean some 200 million years ago, minor crustal fragments that were to become the Falkland Islands detached themselves from the nascent African continent and drifted westwards, dividing and rotating as they did so before settling on the Patagonian Shelf. Most of the layers of West Falkland and its surrounding islands are slightly inclined from the horizontal. This inclination shows different types of rocks in different places. The quartzites of Port Stephens and Stanley are more resistant than the arenaceous sediments of the formation at Fox Bay. The Hornby Mountains, near Falkland Sound have experienced tectonic forces of uplift and folding which has inclined the quartzite beds of Stanley to the vertical.

Rocks from more recent geological periods such as the Jurassic, Cretaceous, and Tertiary periods usually contain lime-rich rocks. The absence of such rocks has led to an acidic substrate which manifests itself in the nature of the soil.

== Topographical description ==
Topographic map of the Falkland Islands

The Falkland Islands are an archipelago of 778 islands with an area of 12,173 km^{2} (4,700 sq mi) located in the South Atlantic Ocean on a projection of the Patagonian Shelf. The two principal islands, East Falkland and West Falkland, account for 91% of the land area. These two islands, which have a combined distance of 220 km (140 mi) from east to west and 140 km (87 mi) from north to south, are separated by the Falkland Sound, a channel that averages 20 km (12 mi) in width and has a typical depth of 40 metres (22 fathoms). Cape Meredith on West Falkland is about 400 km (250 mi) north-west of the tip of Tierra del Fuego and Westpoint, also on West Falkland and adjacent to West Point Island, is about 500 km (310 mi) from the Patagonian coast. It is believed that at times during the Pleistocene epoch (sin. the "Ice Age"), relative sea level was some 46 metres (151 ft) lower than the present time–sufficient for the sound to be bridged.

=== East Falkland ===
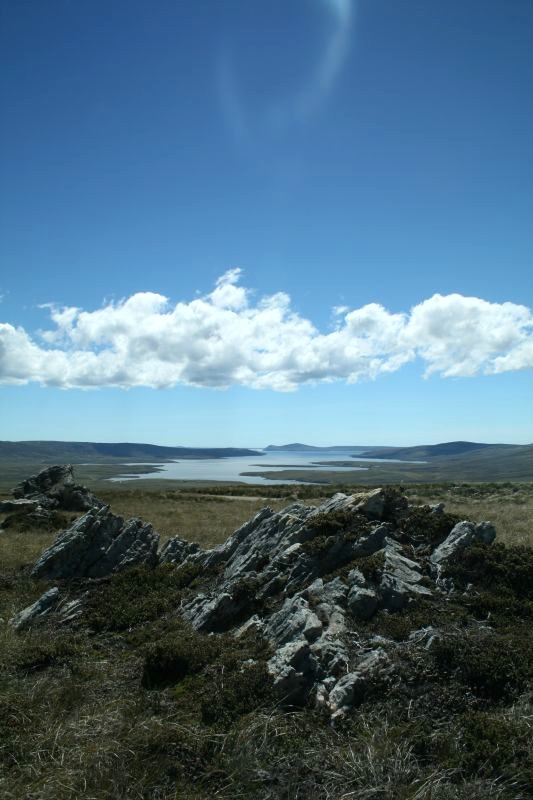
San Carlos Water, one of many inlets on East Falkland. The islands are heavily indented by sounds and fjords

East Falkland, which has an area of 6,605 km^{2} (2,550 square miles), a little over half the total area of the islands consists of two land masses of approximately equal size – the southerly part known as Lafonia, but the northerly part has no specific name. These land masses are joined by an isthmus of width 2.2 kilometres (1.4 mi) that separates two deep fjords, Choiseul Sound and Brenton Loch-Grantham Sound from each other. The island's 1,668.7 km (1,036.9 miles) coastline has many smaller bays, inlets and headlands. Over 70% of the population of the Falkland Islands live in the capital, Stanley, which is located in East Falkland.

The northern part of the island, apart from the coastal strip bordering the Choiseul Sound, is largely underlain by Palaeozoic rocks in the form of quartzite and slate, which tend to form rugged landscapes and coastlines and to cause the soil to be poor and acidic. The principal range of hills, the 600 m (2,000 feet) Wickham Heights runs from north-east to south-west. The highest point of the range (also the highest point in the Falklands), is Mount Usborne which has a height of 705 m (2,313 ft). The area away from the mountain range consists chiefly of low undulating ground, a mixture of pasture and morass, with many shallow freshwater tarns, and small streams running in the valleys. Two inlets, Berkeley Sound and Port William, run far into the land at the north-eastern extremity of the island and provide anchorage for shipping.

In contrast, Lafonia is underlain by Mesozoic age sandstone, a younger rock than the Palaeozoic rock to the north, giving a flatter landscape than is seen elsewhere on the island. Sheets of liquid basalt intruded into the cracks that formed between the sedimentary layers. The resulting solidified sheets can now be seen in the form of dikes that cut the oldest sedimentary layers, those that lie principally in the southern part of East Falkland and in South Africa.

=== West Falkland ===
West Falkland has an area of 4,532 square kilometres (1,750 square miles), making it smaller than East Falkland. Mount Adam, the highest point in the island and part of the Hornby Hills, is 700 metres (2,300 ft) above sea level. The Hornby Hills which are the principal range on the island run approximately north–south parallel with Falkland Sound. Geologically this range is a continuation of the Wickham Heights on East Falkland.

In West Falkland there are several dykes that cut the rocks of the western islands, but these dykes, unlike the previous ones, are chemically more unstable and have been eroded. The only indications of their existence are the aligned linear depressions. In the margins of these depressions there is evidence of contact baking or hornfels formation adjacent to the once molten basalt dyke.

West Falkland is more hilly on the side closest to East Falkland. The southernmost point of West Falkland is Cape Meredith, and the most south-westerly point is Calm Head. On the southerly side lie high cliffs with an abundance of seabirds.

=== Smaller islands ===
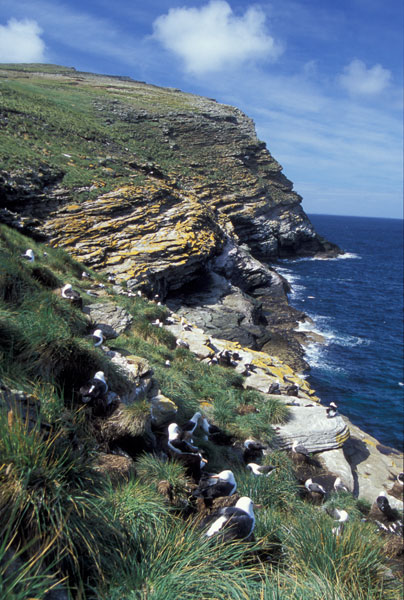
Albatross colony on Westpoint

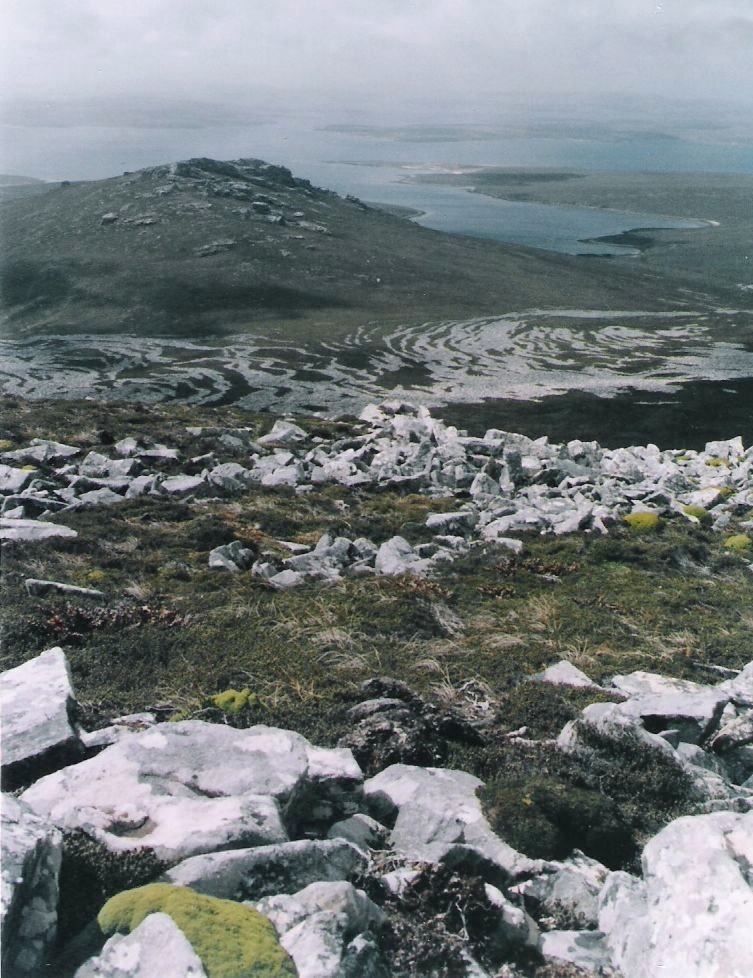
Stone runs on Weddell Island

In addition to the two main islands, the Falkland Islands have over 700 further islands, many no more than a few hectares in area. The islands to the north west of West Falkland include Pebble Island (103 km^{2}), Keppel Island (36 km^{2}), Saunders Island (131 km^{2}), Carcass Island, West Point Island and the Jason group of islands (33 km^{2}) that lie some 40 kilometres (25 mi) from West Falkland.

The principal islands to the south west of West Falkland include New Island (22 km^{2}), Weddell Island (265 km^{2}), Beaver Island (48 km^{2}) and Staats Island. The group of islands that are separated from Lafonia by the Eagle Passage include Speedwell Island (51 km^{2}), and George Island (24 km^{2}). Other islands off the Lafonia coast include Bleaker Island (21 km^{2}), Sealion Island, Lively Island (56 km^{2}), Barren Island. In addition, Beauchene Island, a rocky outcrop lies some 60 kilometres (37 mi) from the Lafonia coast.

Many of the islands are nature reserves, either in whole or in part.

=== Seabed ===
The Patagonian Shelf, which in ancient geological time was part of Gondwana and which broke from what is now Africa, drifted westwards relative to Africa. It is now the widest continental shelf in the world covering 1,200,000 km^{2}. It protrudes some 760 km (470 mi) into the South Atlantic Ocean from the Patagonian coastline and slopes gently to 200 metres (110 fathoms) before falling away; the Falkland Islands being located two thirds of the way along this protrusion. The base of the plateau is about 100 metres (55 fathoms) below sea level to the west of the islands (400 km from the Patagonian coast), sloping to 200 metres (110 fathoms) to the east of the islands where it falls away into the South Atlantic Ocean. The Falklands Plateau, a slightly shallower stretch of water lies to the immediate east of the Falkland Islands.

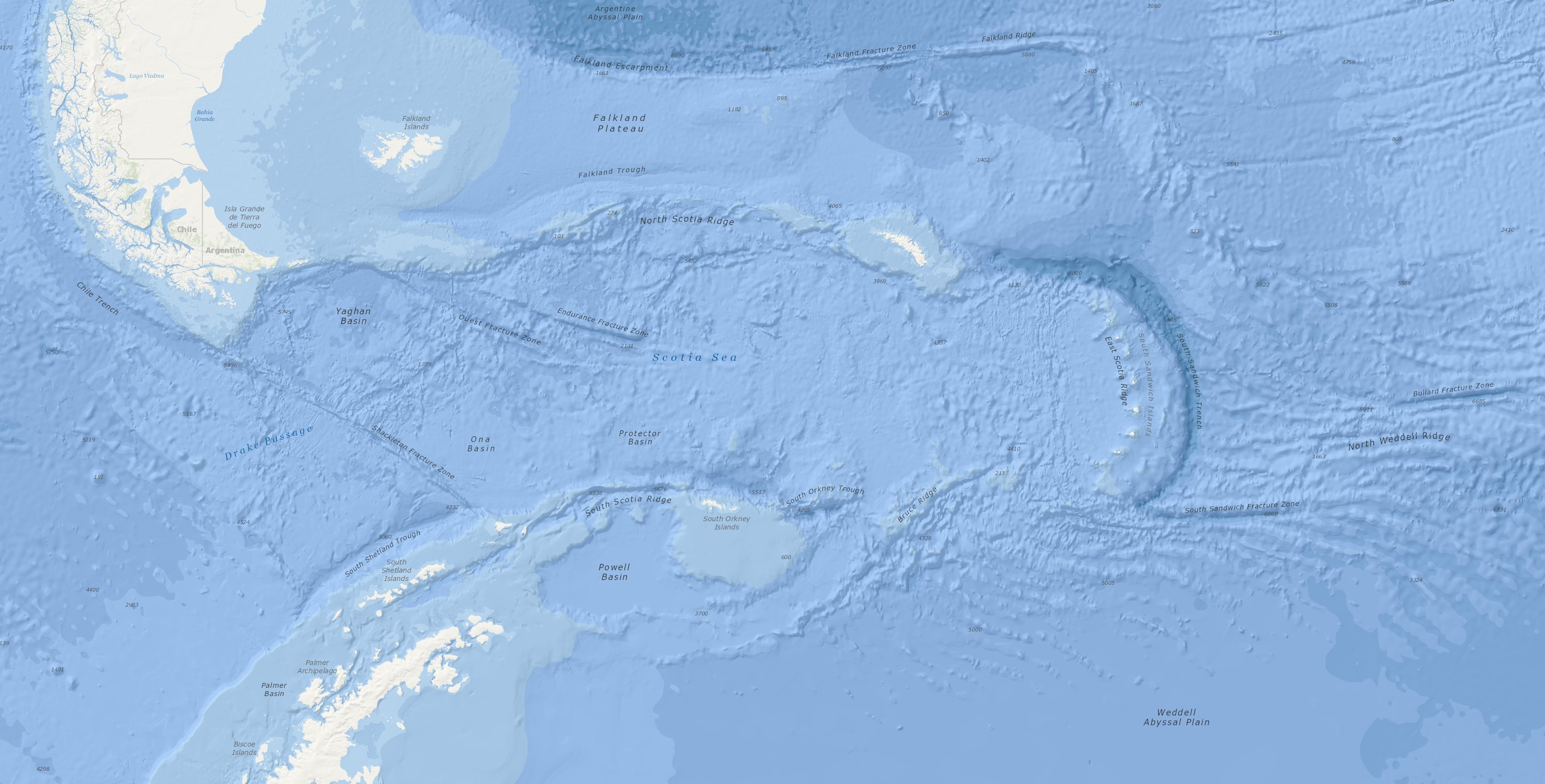
Bathymetry of the Scotia Arc and Falklands plateau

To the immediate south of the islands, the Falklands Plateau is split into two by the Falklands Trough, a submarine valley that separates the plateau proper from the Scotia Arc – an underwater ridge that links Tierra Del Fuego with the Burdwood Bank (where the water is only 20 metres (11 fathoms) deep) and, further into the Atlantic Ocean/Great Southern Ocean, with a number of islands including South Orkneys, South Sandwich Islands and South Georgia.

Burdwood Bank was the location of several landslides some three million years ago. This in turn produced tsunami like events that hit the Falkland Islands on its southern coast. Estimates of the size of the waves vary from up to 40 metres (130 ft) at the southern coast and up to 10 metres (33 ft) where the capital, Port Stanley, is located.

Licences to harvest the large variety of fish that live on the shelf provides a major source of income for the islands as does the licensing of oil exploration.

== Climate ==
Mainland UK and the Falkland Islands on the same scale and latitudes. The Falkland Islands have been inverted to allow both the 51°N and 51°S latitude lines and the 53°N and 53°S latitude lines to be lined up. The Falkland Islands are slightly smaller than Northern Ireland.

The Falkland Islands have a maritime climate in the transition region between the tundra and subarctic zones (Köppen classifications ET and Cfc respectively) which is characterised by both low seasonal and diurnal temperature ranges and no marked wet and dry season while in the sub-arctic zone the average monthly maximum temperature exceeds 10 °C (50 °F) for no more than four months of the year and the average monthly minimum does not drop below −3 °C (27 °F). The Falkland Islands climate is very much influenced by both the cool ocean currents and the shielding effect of the Andes.

The cold Antarctic Coastal Current flows in an easterly direction around Cape Horn where part of it is diverted northwards as the Falklands Current. Subsurface temperatures in the vicinity of the Falklands are of the order of 6 °C. The Falklands Current meets the warm South Brazilian Current at about 40°S (see Brazil–Falkland Confluence), some 1,000 km (620 mi) north of the islands. The prevailing winds at the Falklands' latitude are the westerlies that gather moisture across the Pacific Ocean, but the Andes form a 4,000 m (13,000 ft) barrier causing a rain shadow across Patagonia and to a lesser extent, the Falkland Islands.

The January average maximum temperature is about 13 °C (55 °F), and the July maximum average temperature is about 4 °C (39 °F). (Note: Being in the Southern Hemisphere, January is the hottest month and July the coldest.) The rainfall varies between 300 mm in parts of Lafonia to 1400 mm in the mountain ranges with an average annual rainfall of 573 mm. Humidity and winds, however, are constantly high. Snow is rare but can occur at almost any time of year. Gales are very frequent, particularly in winter.

In addition to parts of the Falklands, a maritime subarctic climatic zone is found in parts of coastal Iceland, Faroe Islands, north western coastal Norway, southern islands of Alaska and parts of the Alaskan Panhandle, the southern tip of South America and mountainous areas of Europe including the Scottish Highlands and south-western Norway.

Climate data for Stanley, Falkland Islands
Month	Jan	Feb	Mar	Apr	May	Jun	Jul	Aug	Sep	Oct	Nov	Dec	Year
Record high °C (°F)	24 (75)	23 (73)	21 (70)	17 (63)	14 (57)	11 (52)	10 (50)	11 (52)	15 (59)	18 (64)	22 (72)	22 (72)	24 (75)
Mean daily maximum °C (°F)	13 (55)	13 (55)	12 (54)	9 (48)	7 (45)	5 (41)	4 (39)	5 (41)	7 (45)	9 (48)	11 (52)	12 (54)	9 (48)
Mean daily minimum °C (°F)	6 (43)	5 (41)	4 (39)	3 (37)	1 (34)	−1 (30)	−1 (30)	−1 (30)	1 (34)	2 (36)	3 (37)	4 (39)	2 (36)
Record low °C (°F)	−1 (30)	−1 (30)	−3 (27)	−6 (21)	−7 (19)	−11 (12)	−9 (16)	−11 (12)	−11 (12)	−6 (21)	−3 (27)	−2 (28)	−11 (12)
Average precipitation mm (inches)	71 (2.8)	58 (2.3)	64 (2.5)	66 (2.6)	66 (2.6)	53 (2.1)	51 (2.0)	51 (2.0)	38 (1.5)	41 (1.6)	51 (2.0)	71 (2.8)	681 (26.8)
Average relative humidity (%)	78	79	82	86	88	89	89	87	84	80	75	77	83
Source: BBC Weather

== Flora and fauna ==
Biogeographically, the Falkland Islands are classified as part of the Antarctic ecozone and Antarctic Floristic Kingdom. Strong connections exist with the flora and fauna of Patagonia in South America. The only terrestrial mammal upon the arrival of Europeans was the warrah, the loup-renard of Louis Antoine de Bougainville, a kind of fox found on both major islands that became extinct in the mid-19th century. Slater suggests that the warrah was introduced into the Falkland Islands either by rafting or by dispersal of glacial ice during one of the glaciations of the late Pleistocene epoch (2.5 million and 15,000 years ago).

A total of 14 species of marine mammals have been identified in the surrounding waters: elephant seal, fur seal and sea lions all breed on the islands with the largest elephant seal breeding site has over 500 animals. A total of 227 bird species have been seen on the islands, over 60 of which are known to breed on the islands. There are two endemic species and 14 endemic subspecies of bird. Five penguin species including the Magellanic penguin breed on the islands as do over 60% of the global black-browed albatross population.

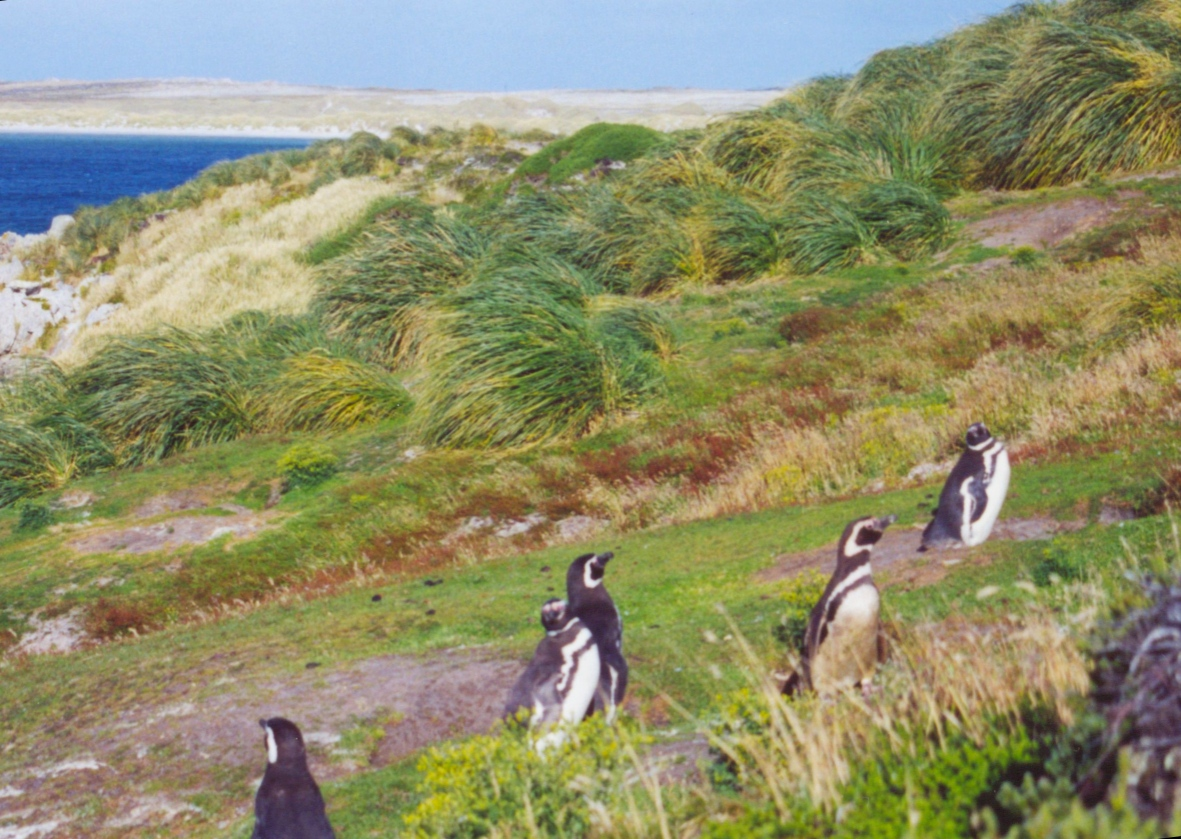
Penguins at Gypsy Cove

There are no native reptiles or amphibians on the islands. Over 200 species of insects have been recorded, along with 43 spider species and 12 worm species. Only 13 terrestrial invertebrates are recognised as endemic, although information on many species is lacking and it is suspected up to two thirds of species found are actually endemic. Due to the island environment, many insect species have developed reduced or absent wings. There are around 129 freshwater invertebrates, the majority being rotifer; however, the identification of some species remains in dispute. Six species of fish are found in freshwater areas, including zebra trout and falklands minnows.

The islands claim a territorial sea of 12 nautical miles (22 km) and an exclusive fishing zone of 200 nautical miles (370 km), which has been a source of disagreement with Argentina. Different species of krill are found in Falkland waters, with Lobster Krill inhabiting the warmer waters in the north. The waters around the Falkland Islands are part of the Patagonian Shelf Large Marine Environment. Fin fish that are harvested in the Falkland waters include southern blue whiting (Micromesistius australis), rock cod (Patagonotothen), Blue grenadier or Hoki (Macruronus magellanicus) and the principal species of squid that are harvested are the Illex squid (Illex argentinus) and the Patagonian squid (Loligo gahi). The squid spawn in the mouth of the Río de la Plata close to the confluence of the cold Falklands current and the warm Brazilian current, migrate southwards along the Patagonian Shelf into the Falklands waters and then return to their spawning grounds along that lies off the continental shelf.

There are no native tree species on the archipelago, although two species of bushes, fachine and native box are found. Other vegetation consists of grasses and ferns. Around 363 species of vascular plants, 21 species of ferns and clubmosses and 278 species of flowering plants have been recorded on the islands. Of the vascular plants, 171 are believed to be native and 13 to be endemic. Some bogs and fens exist, freshwater plants include the soft-camp bog, Astelia pumila (Asteliaceae) dwarf marigold Caltha appendiculata (Ranunculaceae) and gaimardia Gaimardia australis (Centrolepidaceae) and the carnivorous sundew Drosera uniflora (Droseraceae). Tussac grass, which averages 2 m (6.6 ft) in height but can reach up to 4 m (13 ft), is found within 300 m (1,000 ft) of the coast where it forms bands around larger islands. The dense canopies formed create an insulated micro-climate suitable for many birds and invertebrates. The pale maiden (Olsynium filifolium) is the islands' proposed national flower.

== Human geography ==
Prior to 1812, various colonial powers had small settlements on the Falkland Islands. In that year the islands were abandoned but within twenty years the British had re-established a settlement. In the 1851 census, the settlement's population was recorded as 287, increasing to 2,043 in 1901 and 2,563 in 2012. (Note: The census figures exclude military personnel and contract civilian staff based at the RAF Mount Pleasant Garrison)

=== Human settlements and activities ===
The main settlements in the islands are at Stanley which as of 2012 had a population of 2,121, and RAF Mount Pleasant, which in 2006 had a population of about 1,700. A further 351 people lived in "Camp" (outside Stanley) − just over half in East Falkland, a third in West Falkland and the remainder on outlying islands. The principal settlements on East Falkland (excluding Stanley and Mount Pleasant) are at Darwin and Goose Green, on West Falkland at Port Howard and Fox Bay and elsewhere, the Pebble Island Settlement. At the time of the Falklands War, the settlements in Camp were connected by tracks that were often impassable in wet weather, but by 2007 the Falkland Islands had a road network of 786 kilometres (488 mi), with further roads planned for construction to link all occupied mainland settlements by 2013.

In the early nineteenth century, the main economic activity on the islands was seal hunting. Later the islands became a re-provisioning depot for clippers sailing from Australia to the United Kingdom via Cape Horn.

Over 80% of the islands' land is given over to sheep farming, with half a million animals being supported on 11,239 km^{2} of farmland, of which 40 km^{2} was perennial pasture. Roughly 40% of the national flock are on West Falkland and 60% on East Falkland. In addition to dairy and pig farming, a small amount of reindeer farming is carried out, for example on the Beaver group of islands. This herd was the only herd in the world that was unaffected by the Chernobyl disaster.

In the last decade of the twentieth century and the early twenty-first century tourism and fishing have made a major economic impact on the islands and as of 2012 an oil exploration industry was developing.

=== Impact of human activity ===
There is little long-term data on habitat changes, so the extent of human impact is unclear. Vegetation such as tussac grass, fachine, and native box (Veronica elliptica) have been heavily affected by introduced grazing animals. Many breeding birds similarly only live on offshore islands, where introduced animals such as cats and rats are not found. Virtually the entire area of the islands is used as pasture for sheep. There is also an introduced reindeer population, which was brought to the islands in 2001 for commercial purposes. Rats and grey foxes have been introduced and are having a detrimental impact on birds that nest on the shores, as are feral cats. Twenty-two introduced plant species are thought to provide a significant threat to local flora.

== Extreme points ==
- Northernmost point – West Jason Cay
- Southernmost point – Beauchene Island
- Westernmost point – West Jason Cay
- Easternmost point – Cape Pembroke
- Highest point – Mount Usborne: 705 m
- Lowest point – Atlantic Ocean: 0 m
