= List of settlements in the Falkland Islands =

This is a list of towns and settlements on the Falkland Islands.

Map of the Falkland Islands

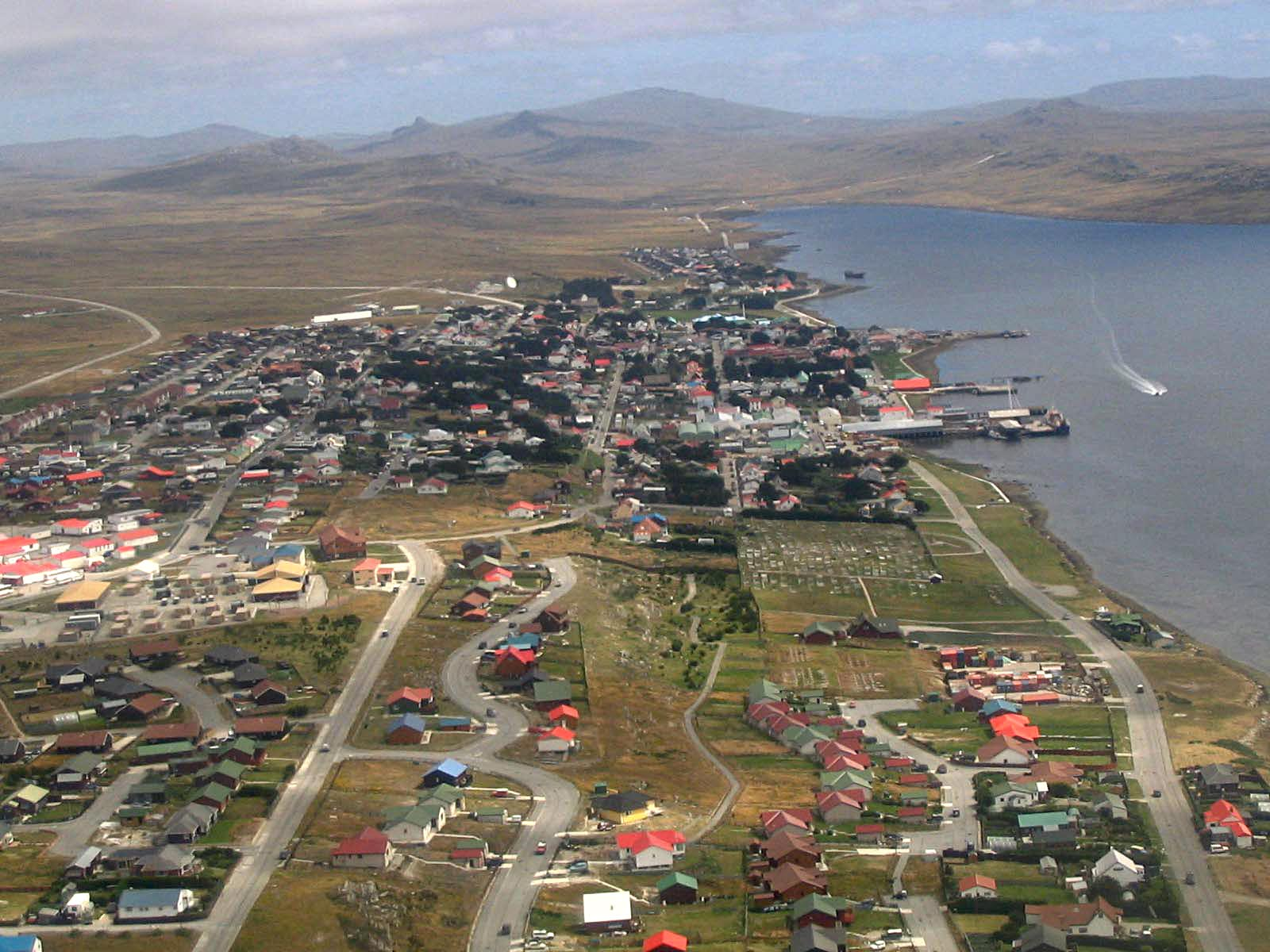
Stanley, Capital of the Falkland Islands

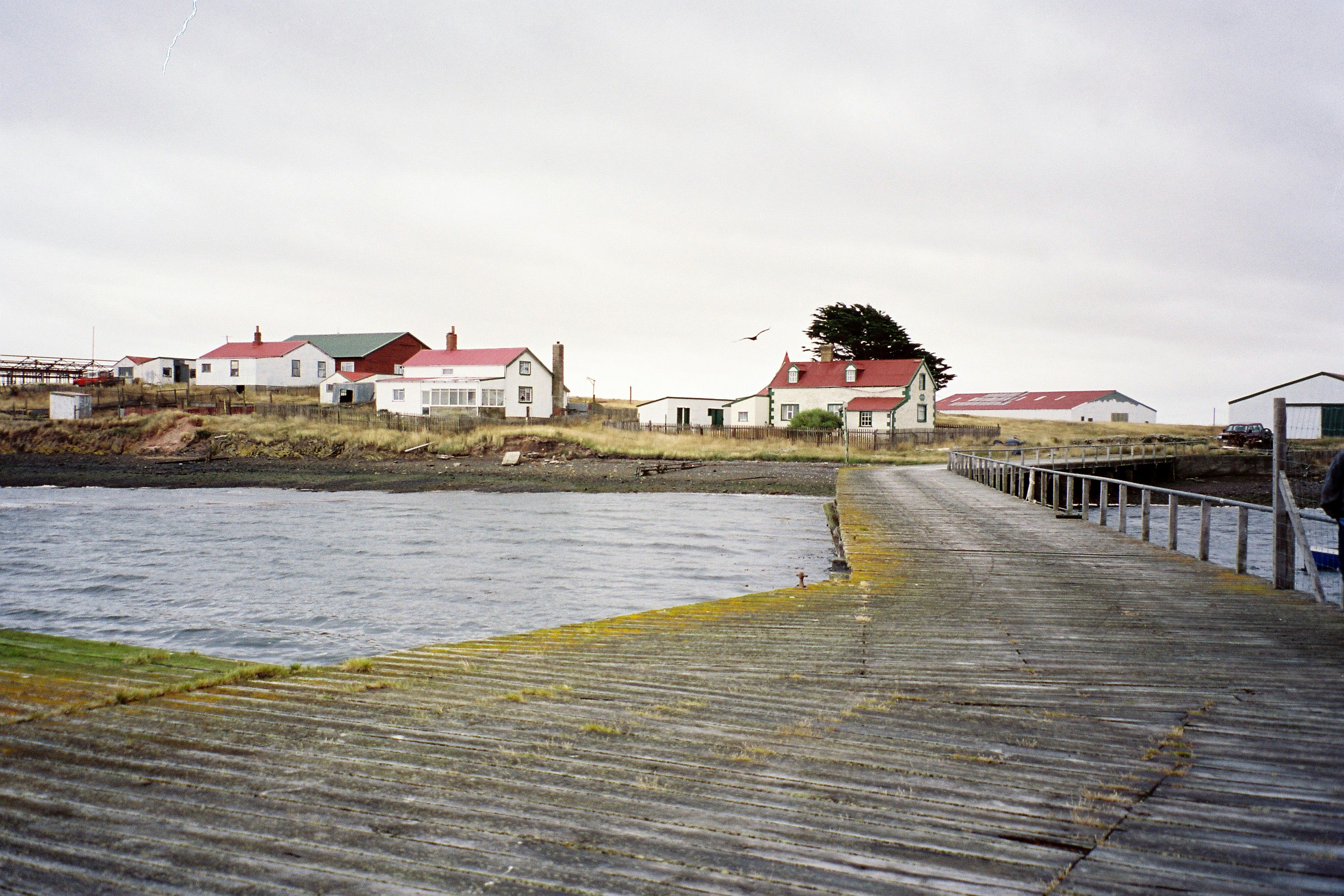
Goose Green

== List ==
Settlements in the Falkland Islands by name, population, and island.

#	Settlement	Island	Population (2021)
1.	Stanley	East Falkland	2,974
2.	Goose Green	East Falkland	40
3.	North Arm	East Falkland	25
4.	Port Howard	West Falkland	22
4.	Fox Bay	West Falkland	22
6.	Hill Cove	West Falkland	16
7.	Darwin	East Falkland	7

=== Unsorted ===
- Ajax Bay (East Falkland)
- Beaver Settlement (on Beaver Island)
- Bluff Cove Settlement (East Falkland)
- Bombilia House
- Burnside House
- Camp Verde (Campo Verde)
- Carcass Island Settlement (see Port Patterson)
- Ceritos (Cerritos) (East Falkland)
- Chartres Settlement (West Falkland)
- Cranmer
- Darwin Settlement (East Falkland)
- Dos Lomas
- Douglas Settlement (Douglas Station) (East Falkland)
- Dunnose Head Settlement (West Falkland)
- Estancia House
- Fitzroy North (East Falkland)
- Fitzroy Settlement (Fitzroy South) (East Falkland)
- Foam Creek Settlement (Foam Creek House)
- Fox Bay East Settlement (East Settlement, Bahia Fox) (West Falkland)
- Fox Bay West Settlement (West Settlement) (West Falkland)
- Goose Green Settlement (East Falkland)
- Green Patch Settlement (East Falkland)
- Hope Cottage
- Hope Place (Lafonia/East Falkland, abandoned)
- Horseshoe Bay
- Johnson's Harbour (East Falkland)
- Keppel Settlement (on Keppel Island)
- Lively Settlement (on Lively Island)
- Mare Harbour Rancho
- Mid Rancho
- New House of Glamis (East Falkland)
- New Island Settlement (on New Island)
- North Arm Settlement (Lafonia/East Falkland)
- Orqueta (Horqueta) (East Falkland)
- Pebble Island Settlement (Pebble Island Farm) (on Pebble Island)
- Piedra Sola
- Port Albemarle (West Falkland)
- Port Edgar (West Falkland)
- Port Egmont (on Saunders Island) (abandoned)
- Port Harriet (East Falkland)
- Port Howard (West Falkland)
- Port Louis Settlement (Puerto Luis, Anson's Harbour), Port St. Louis, Puerto Soledad) (East Falkland)
- Port Louis South (East Falkland)
- Port Patterson (Carcass island)
- Port San Carlos Settlement (East Falkland)
- Port Stephens Settlement (West Falkland)
- Port William (East Falkland)
- RAF Mount Pleasant (Air Force Base) (East Falkland)
- Rincon Grande Settlement (East Falkland)
- Roy Cove Settlement (West Falkland)
- Salvador (Salvador Settlement Corrall) (East Falkland)
- San Carlos (San Carlos Estate) (East Falkland)
- Sand Fountain (Cantera de Arena)
- Saunders Island Settlement (on Saunders Island)
- Sealion Island Settlement (on Sealion Island)
- Speedwell Island Settlement (on Speedwell Island)
- Spring Point Settlement (West Falkland)
- Stanley (Port Stanley) (capital) (East Falkland)
- Teal Inlet Settlement (Evelyn Station) (East Falkland)
- Tranquilidad
- Volunteer Point (East Falkland)
- Walker Creek (Lafonia/East Falkland)
- Weddell Settlement (on Weddell Island)
- Westpoint Island Settlement (on Westpoint Island)

== See also ==
- List of Argentine names for the Falklands Islands
- List of settlements in South Georgia and the South Sandwich Islands
