= List of Falkland Islands placenames =

Most Spanish language placenames in the Falkland Islands are quite different in origin from their English language equivalents, and many have religious resonances. Some names were given by the Spanish conquistadores, while others were given later by the Argentine government.

The Spanish names are almost never used by residents of the islands themselves, and some, such as "Malvinas" and "Puerto Argentino", may be considered offensive by them due to their association with the 1982 invasion of the Falkland Islands. Under a declaration issued jointly following the 1999 agreement lifting travel restrictions to the islands, Argentina undertook to review the Argentine place names for Falkland Island locations, imposed under decree by General Galtieri. However, to date, Argentina still continues to use these placenames to the frustration of the islanders. Many are not generally in use as Spanish names, rather they are names conferred by an Argentine Government committee where there is no Spanish language equivalent.

The Falkland Islands take their name from the Falkland Sound, a strait separating the archipelago's two main islands. The name "Falkland" was applied to the channel by John Strong, captain of an English expedition which landed on the islands in 1690. Strong named the strait in honour of Anthony Cary, 5th Viscount of Falkland, the Treasurer of the Navy who sponsored their journey. The Viscount's title originates from the town of Falkland, Scotland, whose name comes from "folkland" (land held by folk-right). The name was not applied to the islands until 1765, when British captain John Byron of the Royal Navy, claimed them for King George III as "Falkland's Islands". The term "Falklands" is a short name used to refer to the islands.

The Spanish name for the archipelago, Islas Malvinas, derives from the French Îles Malouines — the name given to the islands by French explorer Louis-Antoine de Bougainville in 1764. Bougainville, who founded the islands' first settlement, named the area after the port of Saint-Malo (the point of departure for his ships and colonists). The port, located in the Brittany region of western France, was in turn named after St. Malo (or Maclou), the Christian evangelist who founded the city.

At the twentieth session of the United Nations General Assembly, the Fourth Committee determined that, in all languages other than Spanish, all UN documentation would designate the territory as Falkland Islands (Malvinas). In Spanish, the territory was designated as Islas Malvinas (Falkland Islands). The nomenclature used by the United Nations for statistical processing purposes is Falkland Islands (Malvinas).

A few names have the same form in both English and Spanish; for example Darwin, San Carlos, Salvador and Rincon Grande.

== Maps ==
Map of the Falkland Islands, with British names

Map of the Falkland Islands, with Argentine names

== Names of islands ==
English language name	Spanish language name	Notes
Falkland Islands	Islas Malvinas	The Spanish name for the islands, "Islas Malvinas", is derived from a French original "Îles Malouines" (St Malo/Maclevine Islands)
West Falkland	Isla Gran Malvina	Despite the Spanish name, East Falkland is larger
East Falkland	Isla Soledad	
Barren Island	Isla Pelada	Direct translation
Beaver Island	Isla San Rafael	
Beauchene Island	Isla Beauchéne	
Bleaker Island	Isla María	
Carcass Island	Isla del Rosario	
Eddystone	Roca Remolinos	English name commemorates Eddystone off Devon and Cornwall
George Island	Isla Jorge	Direct translation
Great Island	Isla Grande	Direct translation
Jason Islands	Isla Sebaldes	"Sebald Islands" was once applied to the whole archipelago, and is derived from Sebald de Weert, the first European explorer widely credited with sighting the islands. The Jason Islands are subdivided into two groups in Spanish.
Leeward part of Jason Islands	Islas los Salvajes	Grand Jason and Steeple Jason
Windward part of Jason Islands	Islas las Llaves	Flat Jason, Seal Rocks and North Fur Island
Keppel Island	Isla de la Vigía	
Lively Island	Isla Bougainville	
New Island	Isla Goicoechea	
Pebble Island	Isla (de) Borbón/Isla Bourbon	
Ruggles Island	Isla Calista	
Saunders Island	Isla Trinidad	
Sea Lion Island	Isla de los Leones Marinos	Direct translation
Sedge Island	Isla Culebra	
Speedwell Island	Isla Águila	Formerly "Eagle Island" in English
Staats Island	Isla Staats	Direct translation
Weddell Island	Isla San José	Formerly "Swan Island" in English (cf Swan Islands)
West Point Island	Isla Remolinos	Formerly "Albatross Island"

== Names of settlements ==
English language name	Spanish language name	Notes
Stanley	Puerto Stanley (Puerto Argentino)	Both Spanish names are currently used, "Puerto Argentino" was first used during the Falklands War and is favoured by supporters of the Argentine claim. "Port Stanley" persists in unofficial English usage
Port San Carlos	Puerto San Carlos	Direct translation
Goose Green	Pradera del Ganso, Ganso Verde [sic]	
Port Louis	Puerto Luis	Both names derive from the original French name of "Port St Louis", during the Spanish occupation it was renamed "Puerto Soledad", the settlement was briefly named "Anson's Harbour" by the British but reverted to Port Louis
Port Howard	Puerto Mitre	
Teal Inlet	Caleta Trullo	
Johnson's Harbour	Puerto Johnson	Indirect translation

== Land features ==
English language name	Spanish language name	Notes
Cape Dolphin	Cabo Leal	
Mount Usborne	Cerro Alberdi	
Mount Adam	Monte Independencia/Monte Beaufort	
Mount Robinson		Monte Independencia until it was found Mount Adam was higher
NA	Peninsula de Freycinet	The peninsula north of Port William (no English equivalent)
NA	Peninsula de San Luis	The north east peninsula containing Johnson Harbour, Port Louis and Rincon Grande (no English equivalent)

== Marine features ==
English language name	Spanish language name	Notes
Falkland Sound	Estrecho de San Carlos	English name comes from the Sound, San Carlos Water has a narrower meaning in English
Scotia Sea	Mar del Scotia	The name Scotia Sea was conferred in about 1932 after the Scotia, the expedition ship used in these waters by the Scottish National Antarctic Expedition (1902–04).
Choiseul Sound	Seno Choiseul	Originally named by Louis de Bougainville after the French Foreign Secretary, the Duc de Choiseul
Berkeley Sound	Bahía de la Anunciación	
Adventure Sound	Bahía del Laberinto	
Bay of Harbours	Bahía de los Abrigos	
Grantham Sound	Bahía de Ruiz Puente	
Foul Bay, Falkland Islands	Bahía Sucla	
Port Albemarle	Bahía Santa Eufemia	
Port William	Puerto Groussac	
Queen Charlotte Bay	Bahía San Julián	
Port Edgar	Puerto Edgardo	
King George Bay	Bahía 9 de Julio	
Byron Sound	Bahía San Francisco de Paula	
Keppel Sound	Bahía de la Cruzada	
Stanley Harbour		Originally known as "Beau Porte" (French), and later as "Port Jackson" by the British. Occasionally called Port Stanley.

== See also ==
- List of settlements in the Falkland Islands
- Falkland Islands sovereignty dispute

== Sources ==
- Balmaceda, Daniel (2011). Historias Inesperadas de la Historia Argentina (in Spanish). Buenos Aires: Editorial Sudamericana. ISBN 978-950-07-3390-8.
- Dotan, Yossi (2010). Watercraft on World Coins: America and Asia, 1800–2008. Vol. 2. Portland, Oregon: The Alpha Press. ISBN 978-1-898595-50-2.
- Foreign Office (1961). Report on the Proceedings of the General Assembly of the United Nations. London: H.M. Stationery Office.
- Hince, Bernadette (2001). The Antarctic Dictionary. Collingwood, Melbourne: CSIRO Publishing. ISBN 978-0-9577471-1-1.
- Jones, Roger (2009). What's Who? A Dictionary of Things Named After People and the People They are Named After. Leicester, England: Matador. ISBN 978-1-84876-047-9.
- Paine, Lincoln (2000). Ships of Discovery and Exploration. New York: Mariner Books. ISBN 978-0-395-98415-4.
- Room, Adrian (2006). Placenames of the World (2nd ed.). Jefferson, North Carolina: McFarland & Company, Inc. ISBN 978-0-7864-2248-7.
