= Bodie Creek =

River in Falkland Islands

Coordinates: 51°51′19″S 58°58′41″W

Bodie Creek (Spanish: Ría Bodie), also called Bodie Inlet, is the estuary of Orqueta Creek and other small streams (such as the Findlay estuary) into Choiseul Sound, located south of the settlement of Goose Green in Lafonia, in the centre of East Falkland, Falkland Islands.

In the estuary, the Bodie Creek Suspension Bridge is considered the southernmost suspension bridge in the world, and connects Lafonia with Goose Green.
