= Bodie Creek Suspension Bridge =

Bridge in the Falkland Islands

- Coordinates: 51.8538°S 59.0175°W
- Carries: Sheep and other pedestrians
- Crosses: Bodie Creek
- Locale: Lafonia
- Website: bodiecreekbridge.com

Characteristics
- Design: Suspension
- Material: Steel frame and cables; wood deck
- Pier construction: Stone
- Total length: 400 feet (120 m)
- Width: 8 feet (2.4 m)
- No. of spans: 1

History
- Engineering design by: Charles P. Peters
- Constructed by: Falkland Islands Company
- Fabrication by: David Rowell & Co. (London, England)
- Construction start: October 1924
- Construction end: July 1925
- Opened: October 1925; 99 years ago
- Closed: March 1997; 28 years ago

The Bodie Creek Suspension Bridge in the Falkland Islands is one of the southernmost suspension bridges in the world. It was built in 1925, from a kit fabricated in England by David Rowell & Co., in order to shorten the distance sheep needed to be driven from southern Lafonia to the shearing sheds in Goose Green.

== Background ==
A bridge across Bodie Creek was first proposed in 1922 as part of an effort to centralise the Falkland Islands Company (FIC) Lafonia sheep farming operations at Goose Green which consolidated the shearing of flocks from nearby farms including Darwin and Walker Creek. A bridge was required to allow the sheep raised at Walker Creek to be herded to Goose Green, avoiding a lengthy and arduous detour around Bodie Creek, an inlet of Choiseul Sound. The FIC approved the proposals at a meeting on 31 March 1924.

== Construction ==
The bridge was purchased by the FIC for £2,281 (equivalent to £164,000 in 2023) from David Rowell & Co, London. The structure was shipped, in kit form, to the islands aboard the Pacific Steam Navigation Company's vessel SS Ballena. The bridge was erected by engineer Charles P. Peters assisted by a stone mason/foreman and a gang of around 14 navvies. Construction of the steel structure began in October 1924 and was complete by July 1925. The approach roads were complete by October 1925, allowing the bridge to open in time for the start of the sheep shearing season. The structure was inspected by a party of the Royal Engineers during the 1982 Falklands War.

== Structure today ==
The bridge spans 400 feet (120 m). Its principal parts are an 8-foot (2.4 m) roadway (deck) suspended from four primary 2-inch (5.1 cm) thick steel cables supported by two 40-foot (12 m) high towers at the ends of the span. It is deteriorating and in need of restoration. The Falklands Island Museum and National Trust has raised concerns that the structure may be lost.

The bridge can be visited by tourists and lies around a fifteen-minute drive south of Goose Green. The bridge closed to traffic in 1997. A travel guide describes it as magnificent. It is one of the few engineered bridges in the Falklands, where fords and improvised structures are more common. The structure is one of the southernmost suspension bridges. It was chosen for the 37-pence stamp of the October 2000 "Bridges of the Falkland Islands" local set.
