= Orqueta =

- Orqueta within the Falkland Islands Orqueta (South America)
- Coordinates: 51.84726°S 59.19624°W
- British Overseas Territory: Falkland Islands
- Time zone: UTC−3 (FKST^{[a]})

Orqueta (Spanish: Horqueta), historically also spelled Orquita, is a place in the Falkland Islands located on the Orqueta Creek in the north-central part of Lafonia on East Falkland.

== History ==
Orqueta House was built in 1852 or 1853 as one of the outlying houses of the Hope Place cattle ranch. The name Orqueta was derived from the Spanish 'Horqueta' (lit. 'fork') referring to its location in a fork of two streams.

The house was built of stone and adjacent to Orqueta pond on the highest point in the area. Due to Lafonia's flat landscape, it was visible from two other Hope Place houses, Tranquilidad (nine kilometres away) and Dos Lomas. A turf wall was built to create an enclosure to the east of the house, which bordered the pond. Within the enclosure was a corral and a garden.

Like Hope Place, the house was later abandoned and is now in ruins. The area is now Orqueta Park, a large (550 hectare) field ('camp' in Falkland Islands English) that forms part of Goose Green farm.
