= Orqueta Creek =

Stream in the Falkland Islands

Coordinates: 51°50′37″S 59°14′04″W

Orqueta Creek is a stream in the center of the East Falkland in the Falkland Islands, more precisely north of Lafonia and south of Goose Green, which flows eastward and flows into Bodie Creek. Throughout its stream, it crosses the area of Orqueta. The toponym of Horqueta in Falkland Islands English goes back to the gauchos Rioplantenses who inhabited the area towards mid of 19th century and refers to the Paspalum notatum.
