= Brenton Loch =

Location in the Falklands Islands

Coordinates: 51.771°S 59.020°W

Map of the area around Brenton Loch

Brenton Loch (Spanish, Bahia de Ruiz Puente) is an inlet-cum-small fjord in the Falkland Islands. It is one of a handful of sea lochs outside Scotland. It is sometimes known as "Brenton Sound". "Loch" is normally pronounced as "lock" in the English rather than Scottish manner, i.e. without a fricative "ch". The far south of the loch is known as "La Boca" or "The Boca".

The loch cuts into East Falkland and, together with Choiseul Sound to the east, divides Lafonia from the northern half of the island. It lies to the west of the isthmus on which Darwin and Goose Green are located. At its seaward end, it becomes Grantham Sound. Its name may originate from the fact that many of the inhabitants of Goose Green in the 19th century were Scots.

== History ==
In 1846, Samuel Lafone established a settlement at Hope Place on the southern shores of Brenton Loch, which was mainly populated by gauchos.

In the 1920s, the sailor Conor O'Brien visited the loch on board his ship Saoirse, in which he circumnavigated.

In 1976, pilot Ian Campbell drowned after his Beaver floatplane crashed into the loch.

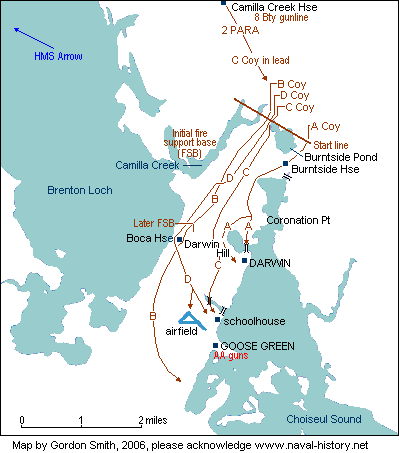
Map indicating the planned Goose Green offensive during the Falklands War

During the Falklands War, HMS Arrow was anchored in the loch, providing covering fire for the Battle of Goose Green.
