= Egg Harbor =

Egg Harbor may refer to the following places in the United States of America:

- New Jersey
  - Egg Harbor City, New Jersey
  - Egg Harbor Township, New Jersey
  - Great Egg Harbor River
  - Mullica River, formerly known as Little Egg Harbor River
  - Little Egg Harbor Township, New Jersey
- Wisconsin
  - Egg Harbor, Wisconsin
  - Egg Harbor (town), Wisconsin

== See also ==
- Egg Harbour, a location in the Falkland Islands
