= Egg Harbour =

Coordinates: 51.8402°S 59.3835°W

Egg Harbour is a location in Lafonia on East Falkland. It faces onto Falkland Sound. There are a few buildings here, some of them abandoned.

== Falklands War ==
Egg Harbour was considered as one of the potential sites for a British amphibious landing during the Falklands War but, in the event, the British landings took place on San Carlos Water in the west of East Falkland, on Falkland Sound. The main objections were to the bottle neck at the Darwin/Goose Green isthmus, which was heavily guarded by Argentine troops, and would have prevented an effective assault on Stanley.
