= Walker Creek, Falkland Islands =

Walker Creek
- Map showing location of Walker Creek
- Coordinates: 51°58′3.72″S 58°46′37.56″W
- Sovereign state: United Kingdom
- Overseas territory: Falkland Islands
- Island: East Falkland

Area
  - Total: 0.062 sq mi (0.16 km^{2})
  - Land: 0.058 sq mi (0.15 km^{2})
  - Water: 0.0039 sq mi (0.01 km^{2})
- Elevation: 16 ft (5 m)

Walker Creek is a settlement on East Falkland, in the Falkland Islands, in Lafonia. It is on the shore of the Choiseul Sound, and overlooks Sea Lion Island in the distance. It is the second largest settlement on East Falkland south of Goose Green, after North Arm.
