= Quaker Harbour =

Bay of Weddell Island, Falkland Islands

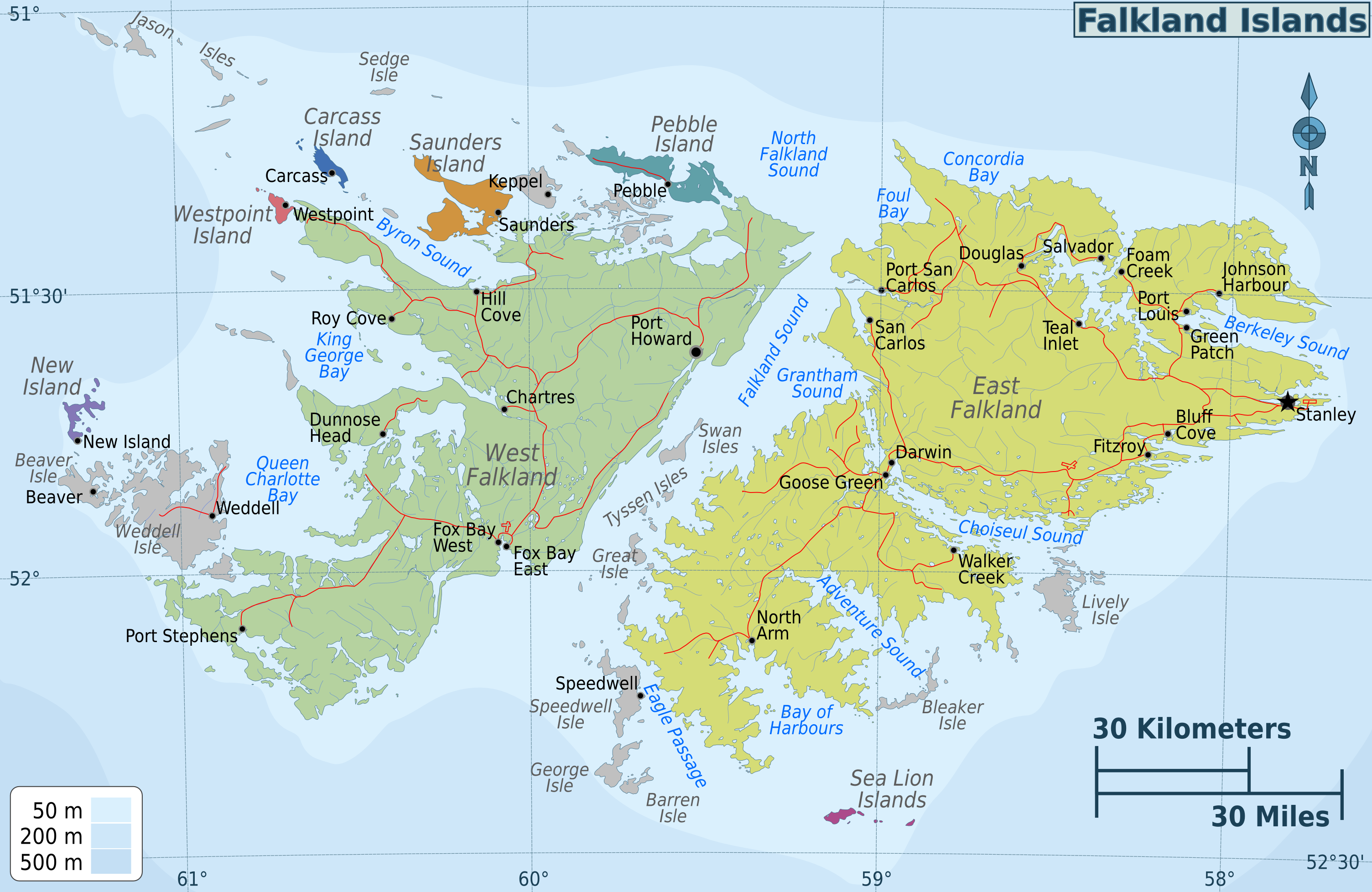
Location of Weddell Island (left) in the Falkland Islands

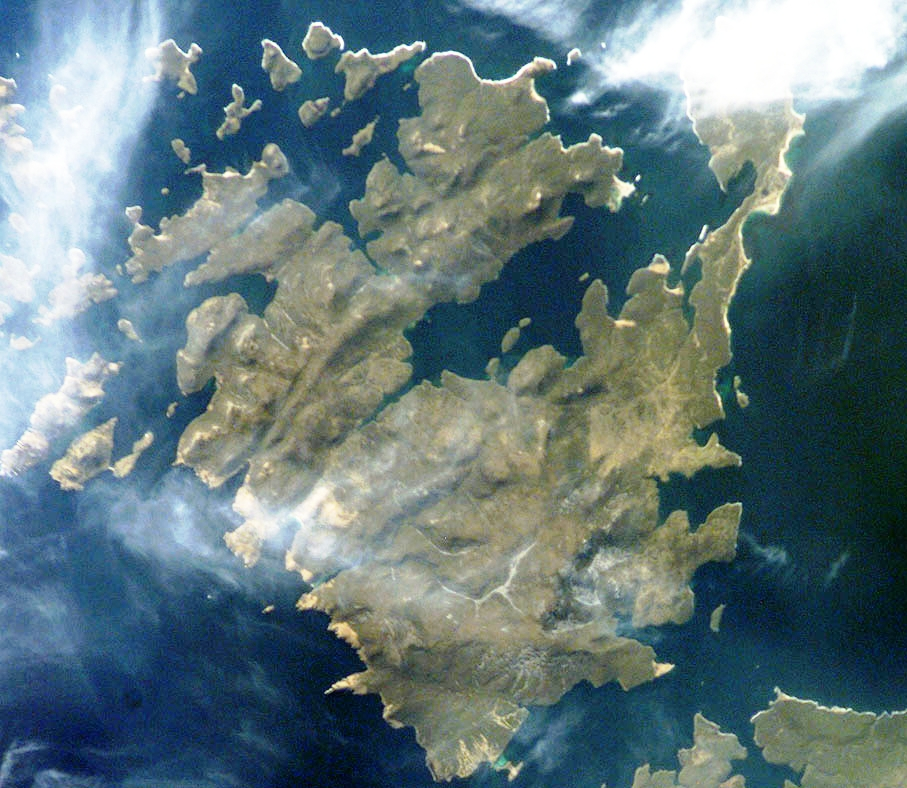
Satellite image of Weddell Island

Quaker Harbour is the irregularly shaped bay indenting for 3.7 km the north coast of Weddell Island in the Falkland Islands. It is centred at 51°48′59″S 61°04′28″W, and has its head fed by Pitt Creek. The bay takes its name from nearby Quaker Island.

== History ==
The British navigator and Antarctic explorer James Weddell, who visited the Falklands in 1819–1824, overwintered ashore on Weddell Island (known at that time as Swan Island) at Quaker Harbour in May–September 1823. The harbour lies on the western side of Weddell Island. Two Hispanicized versions exist for Quaker Harbour; either Bahia de la Plata or Peurto de Ximenez.

Several islands lay in Quaker Harbour and the waters just beyond including Pitt island, Lock's Island, Low Island, Penn Island, Fox Island, Barclay island and Quaker Island. These islands and Weddell island itself, were the haunt of American whaling ships, amny of whom were Quakers, and the sailors upon them lent their names to the islands, such as Penn (after William Penn), Fox Island (after George Fox), and Quaker Island which was named for their faith.

A prominent hill at 51.8145°N 61.0995°W on Weddell Island overlooks the bay. The hill is 300 metres (980 ft) and was renamed in 2022 as Jones Hill in honour of a serviceman killed in the Falklands War. The naming was a project commissioned in 2022 as part of the 40th anniversary commemorations where over 250 landforms were identified and named after those who had died in the conflict.

Comerson's Dolphins have been observed in the bay.

== Maps ==
- The Falkland Islands. Scale 1:401280 map. London: Edward Stanford, 1901
- Falkland Islands Explorer Map. Scale 1:365000. Ocean Explorer Maps, 2007
- Falklands Topographic Map Series. Scale 1:50000, 29 sheets. DOS 453, 1961-1979
- Falkland Islands. Scale 1:643000 Map. DOS 906. Edition 3-OS, 1998
- Map 500k--xm20-4. 1:500000 map of Weddell Island and part of West Falkland. Russian Army Maps (for the world)
- Approaches to the Falkland Islands. Scale 1:1500000 chart. Gps Nautical Charts, 2010
- Illustrated Map of Weddell Island

== Gallery ==
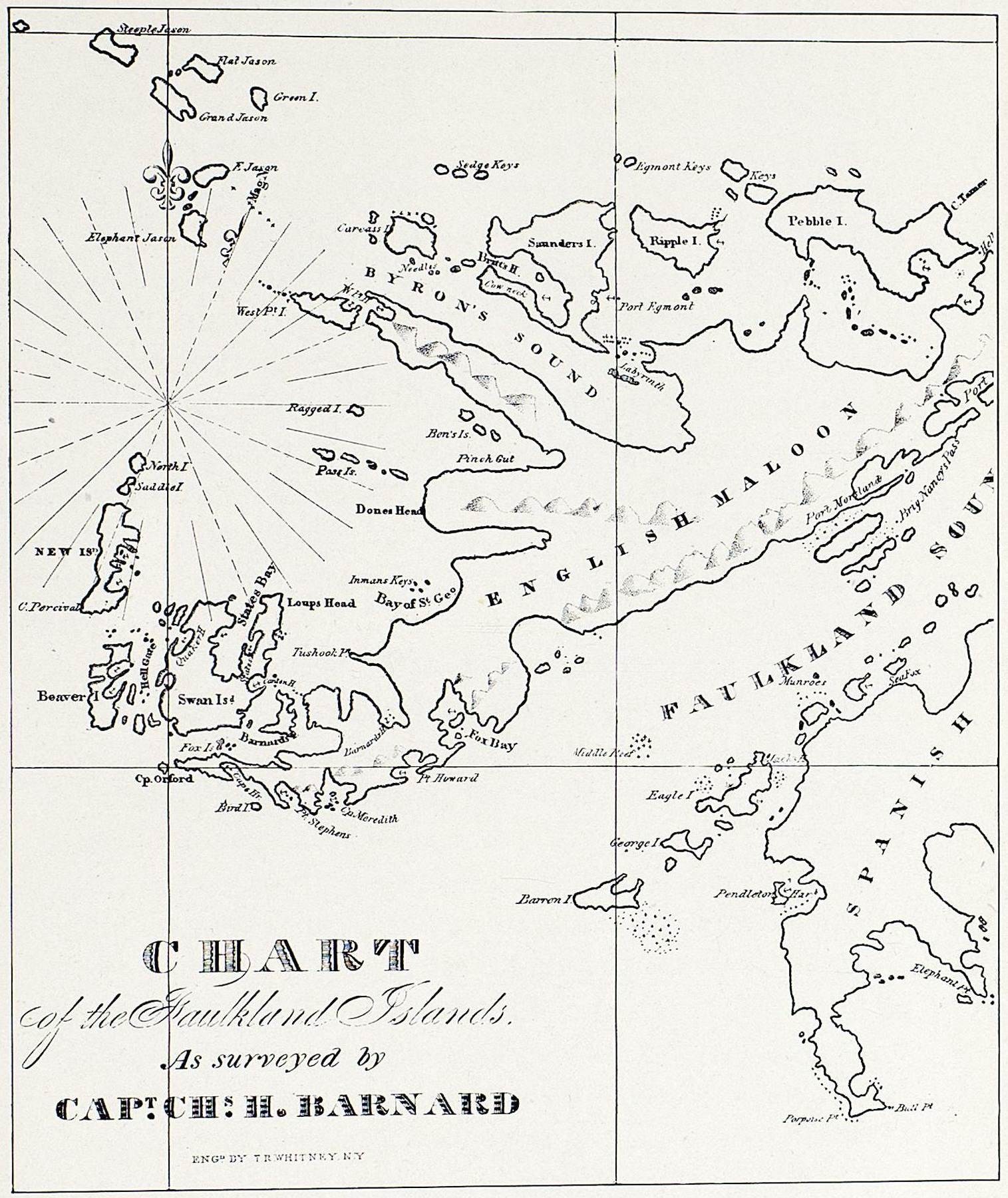
Swan Island (present Weddell Island) and Quaker Harbour on a pre 1829 Falklands map by Charles Barnard

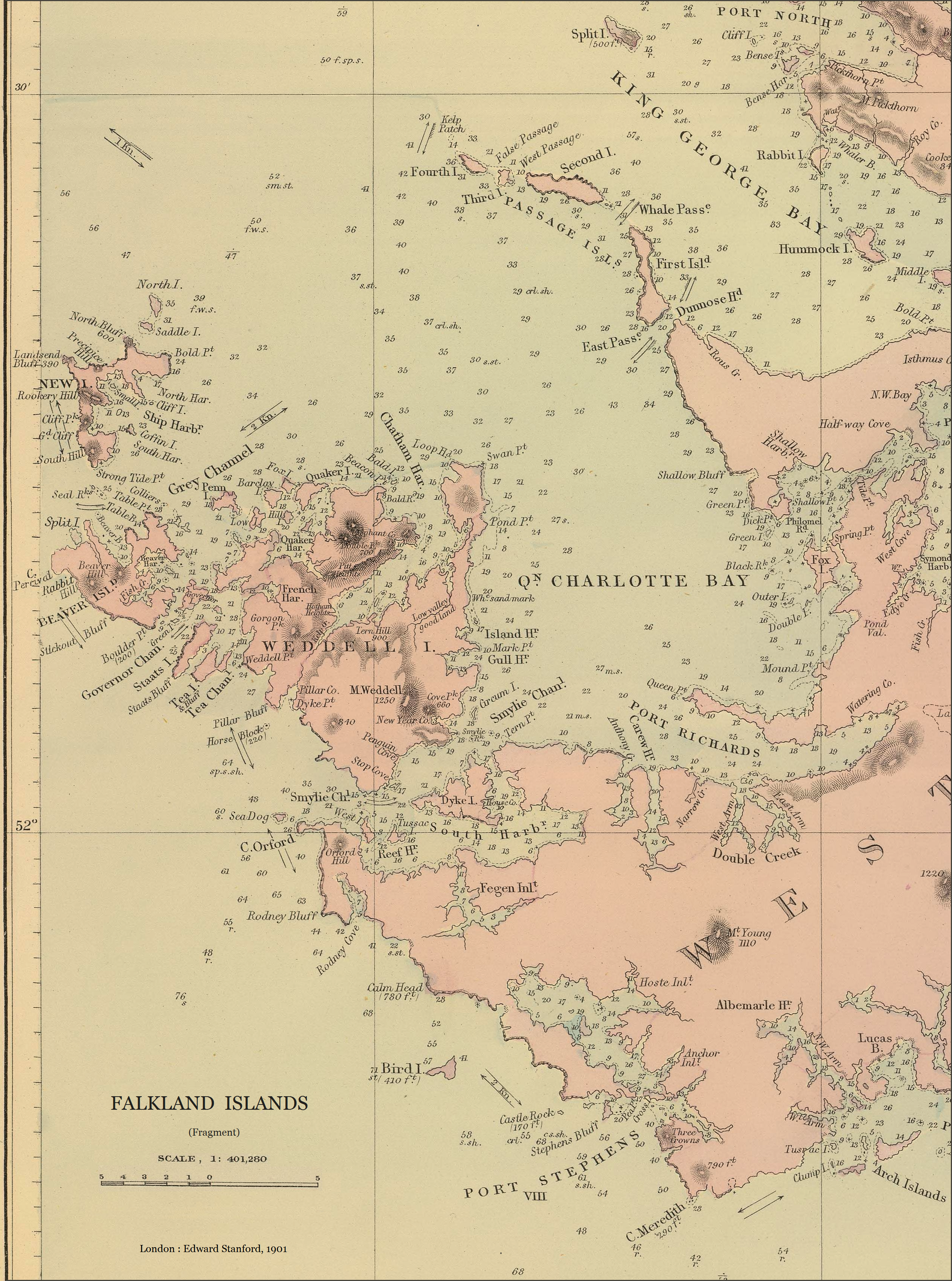
Old map of Weddell Island featuring Quaker Harbour

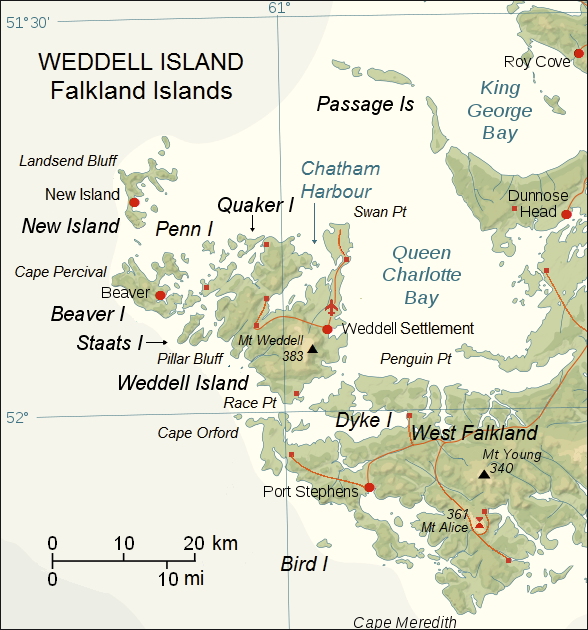
Map of Weddell Island
