= Falkland Islands Company =

Goods and services company

The Falkland Islands Company Ltd.
- Type: Private limited company
- Industry: Diversified
- Founded: 1851; 175 years ago
- Headquarters: Stanley, Falkland Islands
- Area served: Falkland Islands
- Key people: Stephen Scott (Managing Director); Edmund Prozesky (Finance Director); Andrew Williams (Support Services Director); Neil Parr (Retail Director); Jonathan Mainwaring (Construction Director)
- Number of employees: 173 (2025)
- Parent: FIH group plc
- Website: www.falklandislandscompany.com

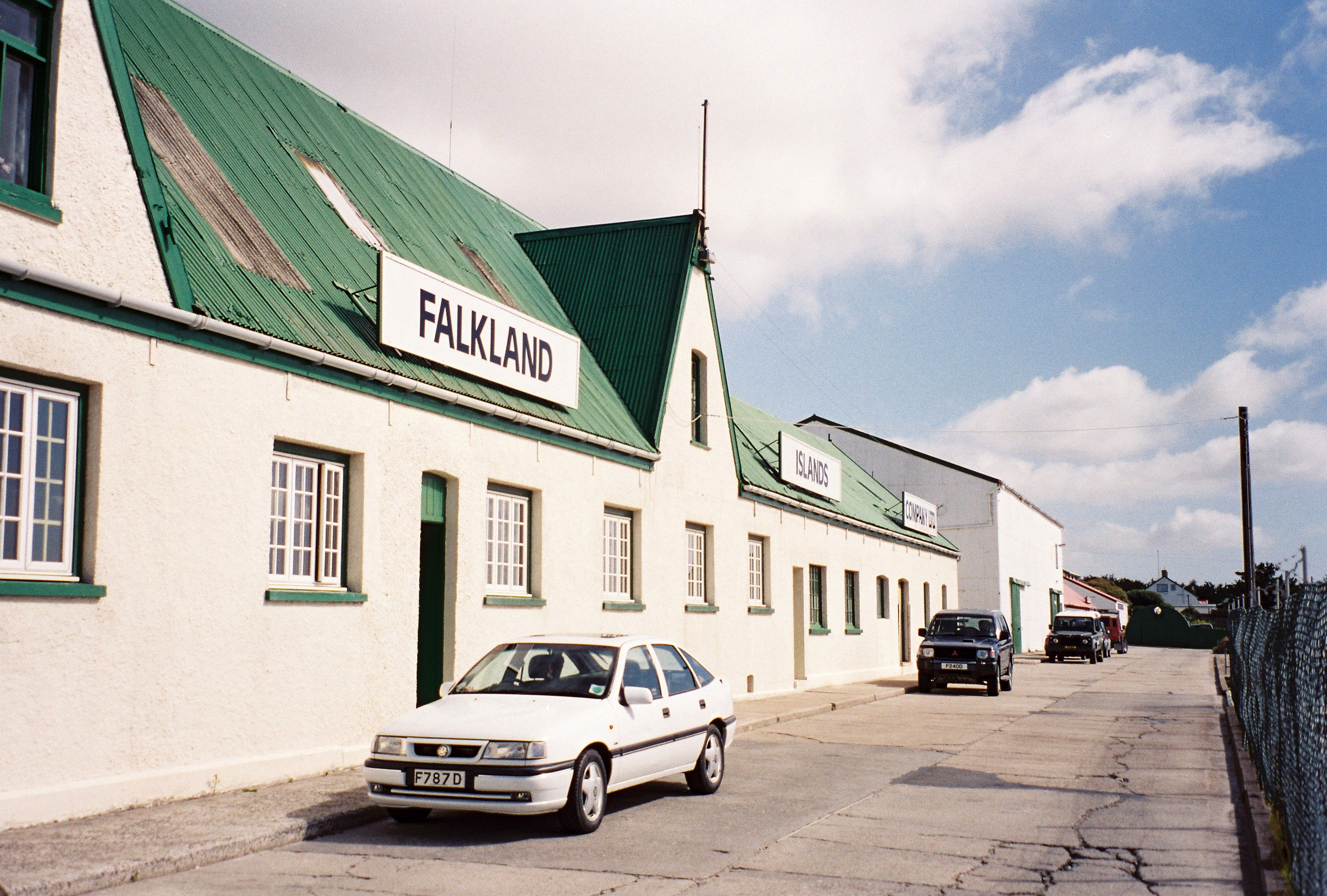
Falkland Islands Company's historical building in Stanley, Falkland Islands.

The Falkland Islands Company Ltd is a diversified goods and services company owned by FIH Group. Known locally as FIC, it was founded in 1851 and was granted a royal charter to trade in 1852 by Queen Victoria. It was originally founded by Samuel Fisher Lafone to exploit wild cattle in East Falkland, but they gave way to sheep farming and then to a range of trading activities in the Falkland Islands ranging from retail shops and cafés to insurance and vehicle hire.

== History ==
=== 19th century ===
Livestock were introduced to the Falklands by early settlers and the resulting feral populations were exploited on a small scale by those that followed them. Initially the emphasis was on cattle, in fact the islands' flag showed a bullock until the 1930s. In March 1846 a contract was awarded to Samuel Fisher Lafone, a Liverpudlian operating a hides and tallow business in Montevideo, Uruguay. Under the contract Lafone was to rent what was to become known as Lafonia, the part of East Falkland south of the isthmus that connects the two halves of the island. The first British Governor, Richard Clement Moody had estimated Lafonia to be 200 square leagues (1,384 square miles, 358,000 ha), but it turned out to be half that size and the cattle, previously estimated at 100,000 head were probably never more than 30,000. In 1846 he sent gauchos who settled at Hope Place just south of the isthmus, and by 1849 they had built a peat wall, the "Boca" wall across the isthmus to contain the livestock.

But as well as there being far fewer cattle than expected, many proved to be of poor quality and Lafone's business was not a success. By 1849 he and his brother Alexander Ross Lafone were negotiating with their creditors to launch a joint stock company named "The Royal Falkland Land, Cattle, Seal and Fishery Company". A new contract was signed on 9 January 1850 under which the Lafones would buy the land south of the isthmus and have exclusive rights to "all wild horses, horned cattle, sheep, goats and swine upon the Falkland Islands" and exclusive rights to supply beef to government and visiting ships until 1 January 1856. The Lafones would pay £30,000 for this, made up of £10,000 they had paid in 1846, £10,000 immediately and five annual payments of £2,000 from 1852. The company was formed in January 1851 and the Charter of Incorporation was signed 23 December 1851. On receiving its royal charter on 10 January 1852, the company was renamed to The Falkland Islands Company Limited and the Lafones owned 32.1% of it, split equally between the two brothers.

They appointed their brother-in-law John Pownall Dale as manager in the islands, and on 19 June 1852 the Record set sail from Liverpool with 45 settlers, 46 Cheviot sheep and a Galloway bull. However the island as a whole lost about a third of its cattle in the severe winter of 1852 (although sheep continued to increase) and the company sold just 20% of the hides expected in the business plan. Dale was dismissed in 1853 to be replaced by Thomas Havers, and Samuel Lafone was removed from the board. Dale strongly promoted sheep as being more profitable than cattle but lasted just 5 years before being replaced by James Lane. The company moved its headquarters from Hope Place to Darwin in 1857 by which time most of the wild cattle on East Falkland had been killed, and they would finally be wiped out in Lafonia in 1883. The Lafone contract for supplying beef to Stanley had expired in 1860 and Lane wanted to improve the profitability of the cattle by salting their meat so he built an abattoir and salting house at Hope Place. In August 1867 Lane was succeeded by Frederick Cobb. In 1880 he proposed the elimination of the company's tame cattle herd on economic grounds, and he got his wish after the tallow factory at Goose Green exploded in 1885. Henceforth the company's farming would depend on sheep and not cattle.

By this time the company was smaller than the rival firm of Dean & Sons based in West Falkland but in 1888 it used shares to buy the trading business (but not the farms) of Deans, which acted as agent for farmers, and operated the West Store in the capital Stanley. The company was also a Lloyd's Agent and owned a hotel and other property assets in the islands.

=== 20th century ===
The year 1913 brought a regular shipping service to Montevideo. In the 1930s the company was regularly transporting wool to Montevideo using the ships Fitzroy and Lafonia. By 1945 the Falkland island company acquired farm property in the Falklands, amounting to total agricultural land holdings reaching 1.2m acres and 300,000 sheep. In 1962 FIC shares listed on the London Stock Exchange. making it a public company. In 1971 The company's last regular ship – the Darwin, stopped travelling between the Falklands and Montevideo.

In 1972, FIC was acquired by The Dundee Perth and London Shipping Company Limited which was then purchased by Coalite Group plc.

In 1989, FIC's owners Coalite were acquired by Anglo United plc in a leveraged buyout.

In 1991, FIC's agricultural land holdings, four farms consisting of 25% of the land of the Falkland Islands, were sold to the Falkland Islands Government following the Shackleton report.

in 1997, Anglo United, which had an unsustainable amount of debt, underwent a capital reconstruction and distributed shares in Falkland Islands Holdings plc to its shareholders. For every 300 Anglo United shares, shareholders received one share in Falkland Islands Holdings. At this point the Falkland Islands Company became a full subsidiary of Falkland Islands Holdings, and its name changed to FIH Group in September 2016.

== Businesses ==
Retail and distribution

- The West Store Shopping Complex:
  - The West Store Foodhall, featuring supplies from Waitrose and Iceland.
  - The West Store Café Stanley.
  - FIC Clothing.
  - FIC Electrical Store.
  - The Capstan Gift Shop.
- Crozier Place:
  - Home Builder, DIY and builders' merchant.
  - Home Living, home improvements store.
  - Crozier Place Café.
- The West Store at RAF Mount Pleasant:
  - The West Store MPC.
  - The West Store Café MPC.
- FIC Warehouse, wholesale sales with chilled & frozen storage.

Automotive

- Falklands 4x4 is a Land Rover dealership, a JCB agency, Castrol Oil's agency and boat maintenance service.
- Hire and lease fleet on the islands.

Property

- The FIC owns 82 residential and commercial properties for let, as well as 400 acres of prime land, much with planning permission.

Insurance

- Caribbean Alliance Insurance Company agent, provides a range of insurance services, including motor, buildings, public liability and contract risk for buildings under construction.
- Lloyd's Agents for the Falkland Islands dealing with cargo surveys and other reporting.

Building and electrical

- Falklands Building Services and Falklands Electrical Services, providing new home builds and maintenance services.

Penguin Travel

- Coach and mini bus provider for local airport transfers, connections and tours.
- Driving school for cars, minibuses, heavy good vehicles (HGV) and public services vehicles (PSV).

Haulage and groundworks

- Fleet of HGV tippers and tractor units available to hire.

Fishing agency: Acting as agent for fishing vessels and for cruise ships belonging to Holland America, Seabourn, Celebrity and Princess Lines, supported by its own fleet of launches and a work boat.

Flights: Agent for the MoD Airbridge service for AirTanker flights between RAF Brize Norton in Oxfordshire and RAF Mount Pleasant.

Falklands Removal Services: Agent for both Whites and Crown Removals with worldwide connections available.

Falklands Shipping: Shipping commercial and private containers between the UK and the Falklands on the MoD FIRS vessels southwards and wool shipments northwards.

Security: Contracted by the Falkland Islands Government (FIG) for the provision of security services at Mount Pleasant Complex for the second commercial flight from South America.
