= Hoste Inlet =

Settlement on West Falkland, in the Falkland Islands

Coordinates: 52.116°S 60.720°W

Hoste Inlet is a settlement on West Falkland, in the Falkland Islands. It is on the far south west of the island, and Port Stephens is the nearest other settlement. The former settlement of Port Albemarle is just across a small isthmus. Dean's river, which rises on mounts Alice, Young and Dean, flows out into the sea through Port Stephens and Hoste Inlet, is known to have a population of zebra trout. At the north entrance to the inlet is Mount Whitford (550 feet (170 m)), named after a serviceman who died in the Falklands War.

The inlet is known for breeding pairs of gentoo penguins; in 1995, a survey recorded 66 nests.
