= Falkland Islands Rifle Association =

Governing body of rifle shooting in the Falkland Islands

- Sport: Shooting Sports
- Category: Fullbore target rifle
- Jurisdiction: National
- Abbreviation: FIRA
- Founded: 1885
- Affiliation: Falklands National Sports Council; International Confederation of Fullbore Rifle Associations
- (Falkland Islands)

The Falkland Islands Rifle Association (FIRA) is the governing body for Fullbore target rifle shooting on the Falkland Islands. The Association has been in existence since 1885. FIRA is a member of the Falklands National Sports Council, which sends teams to the Commonwealth Games. They are also a member of the International Confederation of Fullbore Rifle Associations, who organise the Fullbore Rifle World Championships.

== History ==
Shooting matches were held with personnel from visiting British warships from 1888 to 1979 fairly regularly. During the period 1888 to 1955 the club won 40 matches and the visiting ships four.

Records of the club's history from 1955 to 1973 were lost during the Falklands War in 1982. After the war, shooting was suspended until a new range was provided at Rookery Bay in 1990.

The club has competed at the Commonwealth Games since 1982.
