= Samuel Fisher Lafone =

- Born: 1805; Liverpool, United Kingdom
- Died: April 30, 1871 (aged 65-66); Buenos Aires, Argentina
- Occupation: businessman
- Spouse: María Fligia de Quevedo y Alsina
- Children: Samuel Alejandro Lafone Quevedo; Hope Lafone Quevedo; Guillermo Lafone Quevedo

Samuel Fisher Lafone (Liverpool, 1805 – Buenos Aires, April 30, 1871) was a British-born Uruguayan businessman.

Lafone developed an important economic activity in Montevideo and Argentina. He established a settlement at Hope Place on the southern shores of Brenton Loch, Falkland Islands, in 1846. He was also responsible for the planning of the neighborhood of La Teja with the government of Montevideo.

== Investments ==
In 1851, Lafone's interest in Lafonia (Falkland Islands), as the place came to be called, was purchased for £30,000 by the Falkland Islands Company, which had been incorporated by charter in the same year. His name is closely linked to the development of La Teja neighborhood (where today a square is named for him).

He was a decisive promoter of the creation of the Anglican Holy Trinity Temple in Montevideo. In the year 1843, through the sole effort of Samuel Lafone, the foundation of the Holy Trinity Church[13] was laid. Samuel Lafone exclusively made the finance of this church. This gentleman came over from Buenos Aires, where he underwent serious problems when he married Maria Quevedo Alsina. The wedding ceremony had been performed by a Protestant clergyman, the bride's father complained to the government in Buenos Aires, since in accordance with the ruling at that time, marriages could only be effected by the Catholic Church. Enraged by these proceedings Mr. Lafone, eventually decided to leave Buenos Aires, and come to settle in Uruguay, where he became a very successful businessman.

Lafone started salting meat, in the Cerro, expanded to producing jerked beef, and went into other enterprises with great success. In this time of business he was at one time in partnership with the Governor of Entre Rios, Justo José de Urquiza, who was running an establishment in Entre Rios of 950000 hectares. The brothers Lafone, together with Admiral S. Santorius in the year 1843 made a proposal to buy Isla Gorriti for 1500 pesos. The proposal was accepted, but when publications appeared of criticisms from other countries, growing stronger, the Uruguayan government canceled the concession, as the government under abnormal circumstances had made the same. Litigation eventually ended by awarding the three partners £1000 each as compensation. That same year the brothers Lafone revived an enterprise of Francisco Aguilar (who had imported camels to be used in the sand dunes). They proposed the foundation on the peninsula of Punta del Este of a township of 120 squares. Two thirds to remain state property, and the remaining third to the Lafone brothers. The town council in Maldonado sought to have the purchase annulled. Eventually some settlement was reached. The Lafone brothers had the seal concession in Lobos Island for years. They also had a concession to farm in the Falkland Islands, in fact there is a peninsula called Lafonia, and were involved in many commercial enterprises that started arising in 1850.

On the way to the Cerro, on calle C.M. Ramirez, there is a plaza, just before reaching the bridge, named Plaza Lafone, and a street nearby named Samuel Lafone. In this part of the town the Lafone brothers had the slaughterhouse, where they prepared the salted meat for export.

He died in Buenos Aires on April 30, 1871, after having become sick of yellow fever due to participating in tasks of his community against the yellow fever pandemic of that year.
