= Grantham Sound =

Bay in the Falkland Islands

Coordinates: 51.661°S 59.118°W

Grantham Sound (Spanish: Bahia de Ruiz Puente) is a bay on East Falkland, Falkland Islands, which opens out into the Falkland Sound. At its landward end, it narrows and becomes Brenton Loch (sometimes included as a part of it). Mount Usborne overlooks it.

Along with San Carlos Water, it is one of the proposed sites for the East Falkland terminal for the anticipated ferry to West Falkland.
