= Staats Island =

- Island
- Location of Staats Island within the Weddell Island Group of the Falkland Islands
- Coordinates: 51.892°S 61.192°W
- Country: Falkland Islands

Area
  - Total: 5 km^{2} (1.9 sq mi)
- Time zone: UTC−3 (FKST)
- If shown, area and population ranks are for all islands and all inhabited islands in the Falklands respectively.

Staats Island is an uninhabited island of the Beaver Island Group in the Falkland Islands. It lies between Beaver Island and Weddell Island, parallel to Tea Island and is 500 hectares (1,236 acres) in area.

== Wildlife ==
The island is known for its Patagonian foxes and guanacos, both introduced species; the former is not to be confused with the closely related Falkland Islands fox now extinct. The introduction of guanaco has led to overgrazing of the tussac while the introduction of foxes has had a negative effect on the resident birds and there is an eradication programme to eliminate foxes from this and other islands in the Beaver Island Group

The guanaco population, from 15 animals introduced in 1938–39, rapidly grew to around 275 by 1956, when culling began in order to replace them with sheep. By the early 1960s, they had been reduced to around 10-20 animals. The population oscillated between a few hundred and a few dozen, with repeated culling; as of 2004, the population had risen back to around 400 animals. Other introduced species in the 1930s included a pair of lesser rheas (known to Falklanders as "ostriches") and a number of Humboldt's hog-nosed skunks; the rheas did not establish themselves, as their nests were raided by the foxes, but the skunks lasted until at least 1956.

Other wildlife on the island includes Magellanic penguins and other seabirds.
