= Hope Place =

Settlement in Lafonia, Falkland Islands

Coordinates: 51.845°S 59.018°W

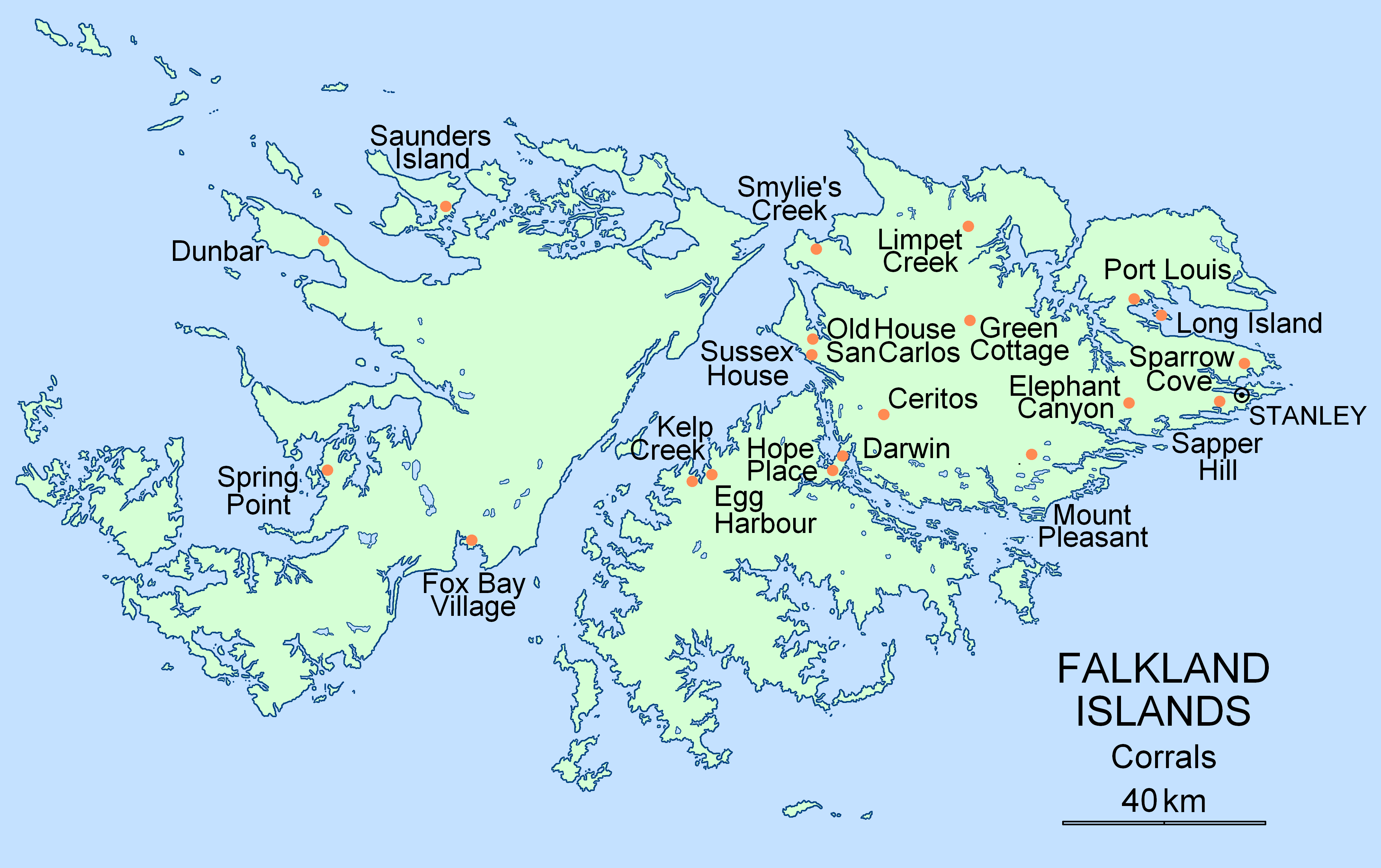
Location of Hope Place on the Islands

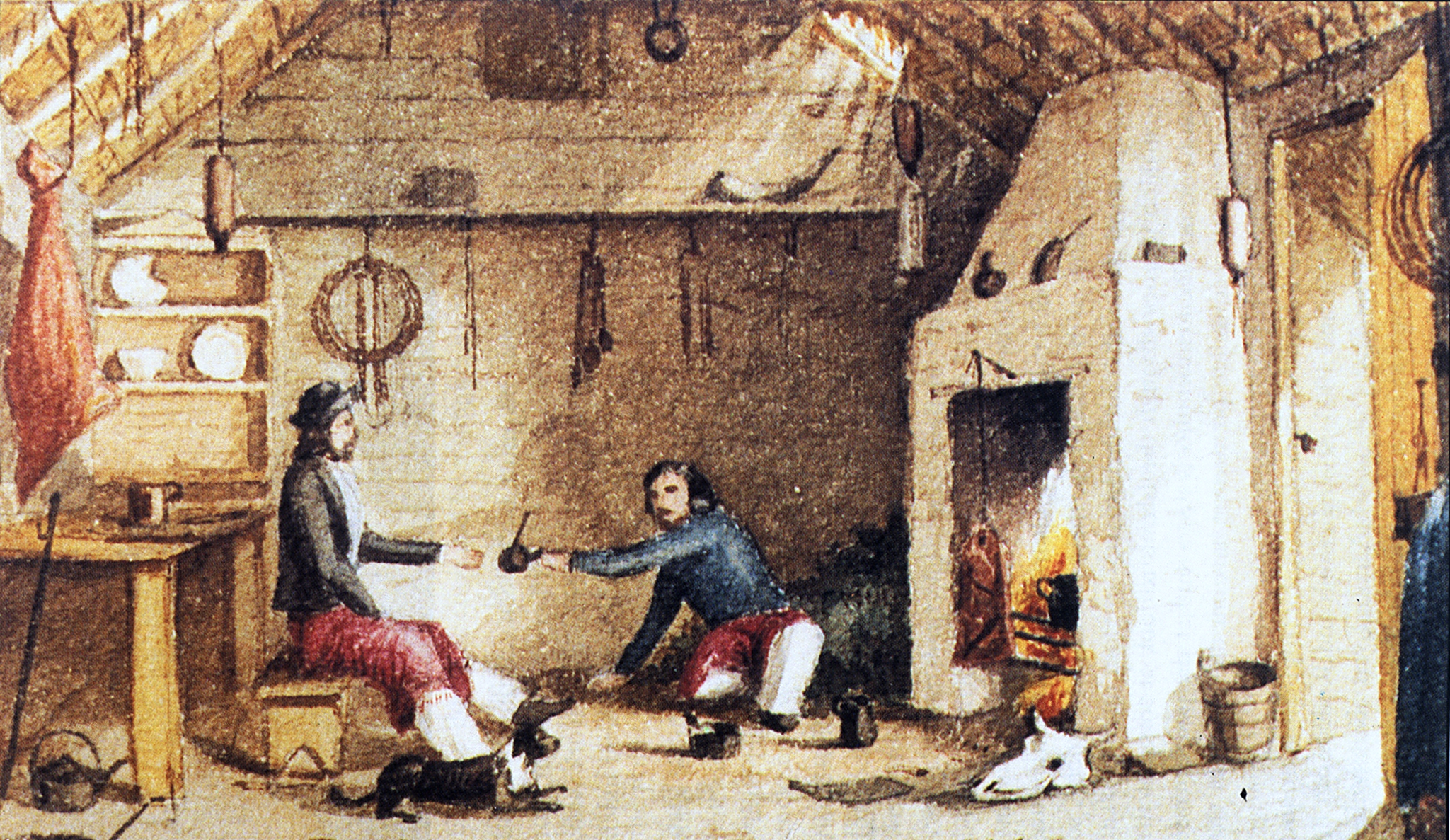
Falklands gauchos having mate at Hope Place - Saladero, East Falkland. Watercolour by Dale, manager of Hope Place in the 1850s.

Hope Place (known in Spanish as Valle Esperanza, meaning "Hope Valley") was a small settlement in Lafonia in East Falkland. It was set up in 1846, by Samuel Lafone, a British-born Montevideo merchant, on the south shores of Brenton Loch. It was mainly populated by Uruguayan gauchos brought in from continental South America. The area is now abandoned.

== See also ==
- History of the Falkland Islands
- Origins of Falkland Islanders
