= Sea Lion Island =

- Island
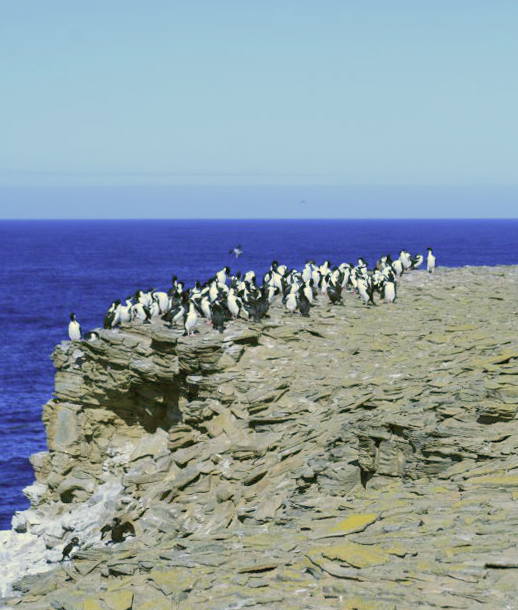
- Imperial shags on outcrop on Sea Lion Island

- Sea Lion Island shown within the Falkland Islands
- Coordinates: 52°26′S 59°05′W
- Country: Falkland Islands
- Main settlement: Sea Lion Island Settlement

Area
  - Total: 9.05 km^{2} (3.49 sq mi)
- Highest elevation (Bull Hill): 46 m (151 ft)
- Time zone: UTC−3 (FKST)
- If shown, area and population ranks are for all islands and all inhabited islands in the Falklands respectively.

Ramsar Wetland
- Designated: 24 September 2001
- Reference no.: 1104

Sea Lion Island (Spanish: Isla de los Leones Marinos) is the largest of the Sea Lion Island Group of the Falkland Islands. It is 9 km^{2} (3 sq mi) in area and lies 14 km (9 mi; 8 nmi) southeast of Lafonia (East Falkland). It was designated a Ramsar site on 24 September 2001, and as an Important Bird Area (BirdLife International 2006). In 2017 the island was designated as a National Nature Reserve.

== Description ==
Sea Lion Island is 7.8 km (4.8 mi) long from east to west and 2.3 km (1.4 mi) wide, with 30 m (98 ft) cliffs at the south-western point and sandy bays to the east. The highest point at 46 m (151 ft) is Bull Hill. East Loafers is the name of the bay on the southern shore. It also has a few ponds, including Beaver and Long Pond. Just to the south is Rum Island, a small seal colony. Other small members of the group are Brandy and Whisky Islands. The geology is mainly sandstone and mudstone, from about 250 million years ago. Some minor fossils have been found.

== History ==
Sea Lion Island is the southernmost inhabited island of the Falkland Islands. Only formerly inhabited Beauchene Island is located further south. Sea Lion Island Settlement is the southernmost settlement of the Falkland Islands. The island has an airstrip. Historically, Sea Lion Island was a sheep farm. When the British ship Viscount was wrecked in 1892, the wreckage was used to build the farmhouse.

The island was managed as a sheep farm for almost all of the 20th century, but in 1997 all but a small flock of sheep was removed. In 1990, the Clifton family who owned the island, sold it to the Falkland Islands Development Corporation (FIDC). They had planted 60,000 stands of tussac grass. Since then, ecotourism has been the only economic activity. In 1986 FIDC constructed the Sea Lion Lodge, with accommodation for 20 guests. It was prefabricated and flown in kit form to the island by Royal Air Force helicopters and has proved to be a success. It is used by tourists and, since 1996, scientific researchers. Since 2017 the Lodge and island has been under the lease of Wild Falkland Ltd.

There is a memorial to HMS Sheffield on Bull Hill in the south of the island.

On March 8, 2024, a wildfire started on the island due to a lightning strike. FIGAS operated emergency flights to bring in crews along with the FVP Lilibet brought in equipment. The fire burned for well over a week

== Flora and fauna ==
Some 56 species of flowering plants have been recorded, including the Fuegian violet which, in the Falklands, is found nowhere else. The island is known for its marine mammals, including breeding colonies of southern sea lions and southern elephant seals, for which the other islands in the group are haul-out sites. Killer whales are seen offshore. Since 1995, the Elephant Seal Research Group (ESRG) has been tracking the habits of elephant seals at Sea Lion Island.

=== Birds ===
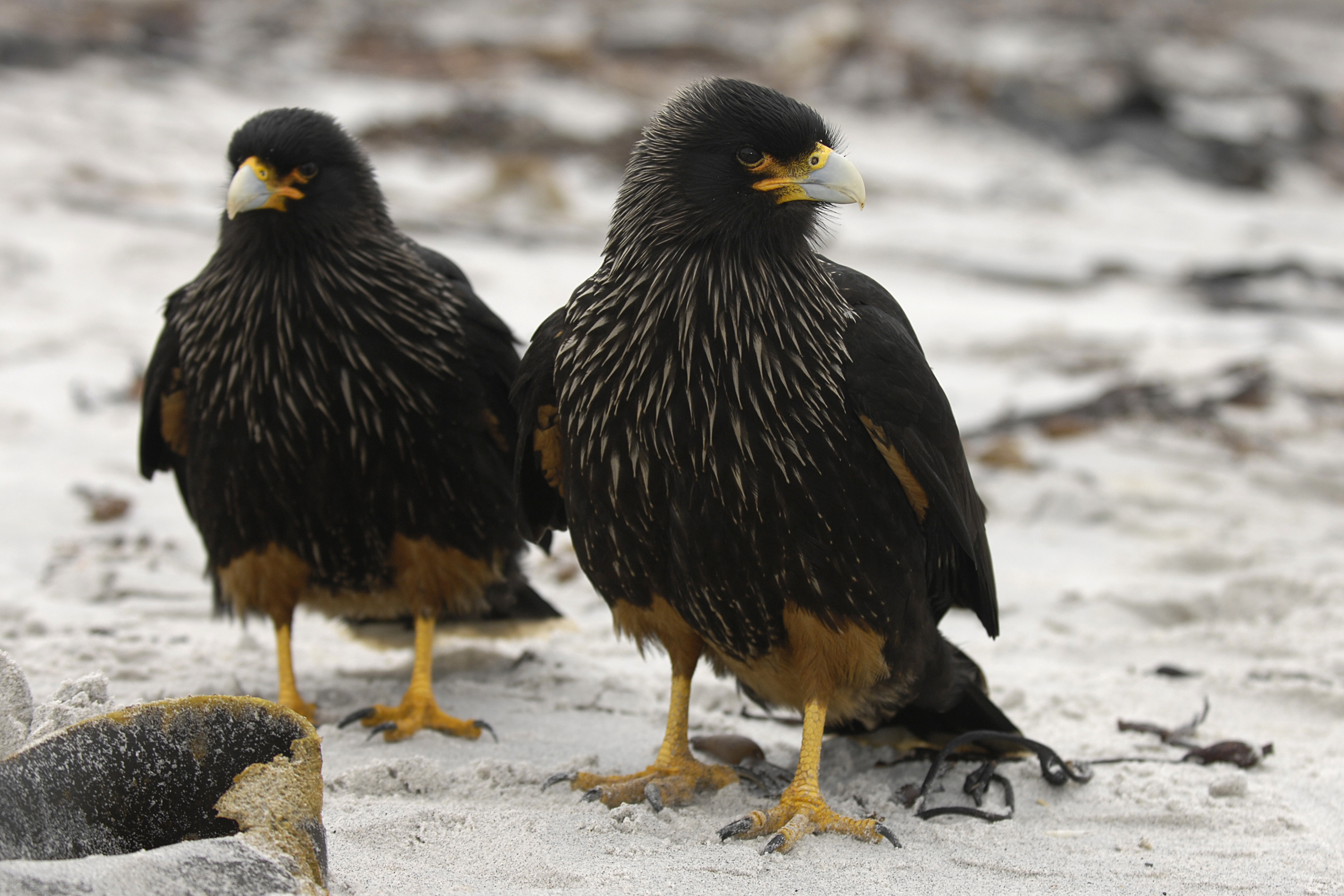
Striated Caracara on Sealion Island

The Sea Lion Islands Group has been identified by BirdLife International as an Important Bird Area. It is a significant breeding site for a variety of seabirds and other waterbirds including Falkland steamer ducks, ruddy-headed geese, gentoo penguins (2800 pairs), southern rockhopper penguins (480 pairs), Magellanic penguins, southern giant-petrels (25 pairs) and sooty shearwaters. It also supports populations of striated caracaras (10 pairs), blackish cinclodes, Cobb's wrens and white-bridled finches.
