= Choiseul Sound =

Sea area in the Falkland Islands

Coordinates: 51.930°S 58.658°W

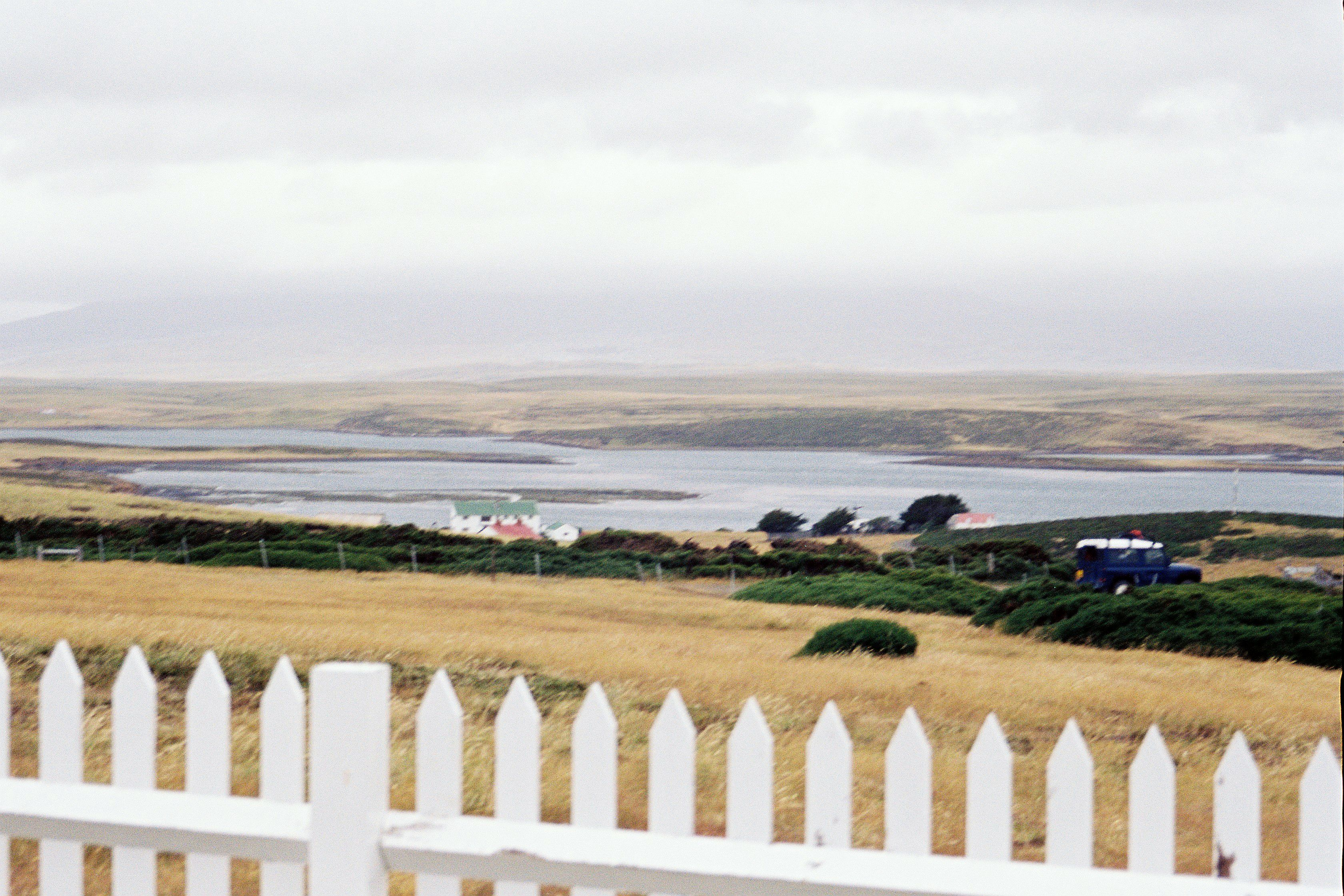
Choiseul Sound viewed from Darwin

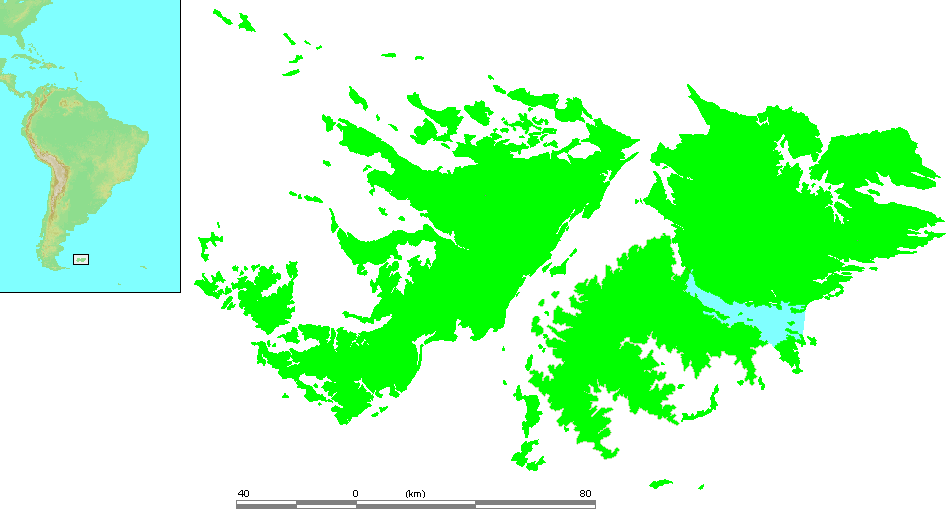
Location of Choiseul Sound (in blue at right)

Choiseul Sound (/ˈtʃɪzəl/ CHIZZ-əl) is a stretch of sea in the Falkland Islands.

== Geography ==
It runs parallel to Eagle Passage and is between Lafonia and the north of East Falkland. Lively Island is in its mouth. At its entrance, on the northern shore, is the Bertha's Beach Important Bird Area which is also a Ramsar site, recognising it as a wetland of international importance. Just to the west of Bertha's Beach is Mare Harbour; a Royal Naval facility that receives military shipping. Choiseul Sound and Brenton Loch almost sever East Falkland in two, with a narrow isthmus with Darwin and Goose Green between the two bodies of water.

== History ==
It was named by Louis de Bougainville after the French Foreign Secretary, Étienne François, duc de Choiseul. In 1845, Samuel Fisher Lafone, purchased the land south of Choiseul Sound (Lafonia) and all the islands within the sound from Queen Victoria.

In the Second World War, the ships HMS Fitzroy and HMS Scoresby had a layover in Choiseul Sound before proceeding to the Antarctic on Operation Tabarin. During the Falklands War, several Argentine aircraft were shot down over Choiseul Sound by Royal Navy Harriers.

== Name ==
The name is pronounced "Chisel" in Falkland Islands dialect. The Hispanicized name for the sound is Seno Choiseul.

== Dimensions ==
The sound is 2 miles (3.2 km) wide and 20 miles (32 km) long. An inlet 400 metres (1,300 ft) north of Scott island in Choiseul Sound is named after a member of the British Armed Forces who died in Choiseul Sound in the Falklands War.
