= Goose Green =

Goose Green Goose
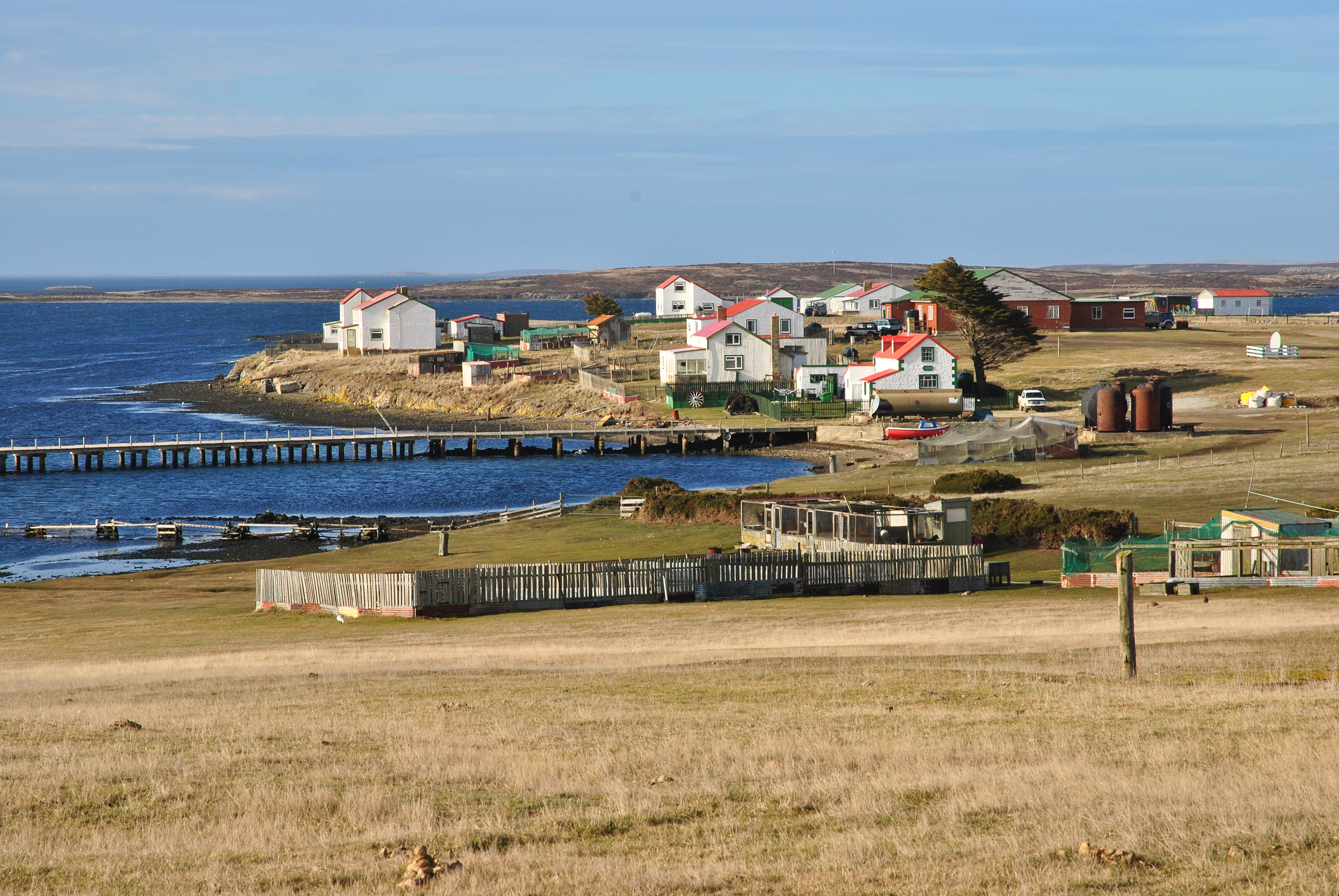
- Goose Green in mid-August 2012

- Goose Green within the Falkland Islands Goose Green (South America)
- Coordinates: 51°49′38″S 58°58′23″W
- British Overseas Territory: Falkland Islands

Population (2012)
  - Total: 40
- Time zone: UTC−3 (FKST^{[a]})

Goose Green, also known simply as Goose, is a hamlet in Lafonia on East Falkland in the Falkland Islands. It lies on Choiseul Sound, on the east side of the island's central isthmus, 2 miles (3.2 km) south-southwest of Darwin. With a population of about 40, it is the third-largest settlement of the Falkland Islands, after Stanley and Mount Pleasant.

Goose Green has a shop and a small airfield. Local attractions include the nearby Bodie Suspension Bridge and the shipwreck of the Vicar of Bray, which participated in the California gold rush.

At 430,000 acres (1,700 km^{2}), Goose Green farm is double the size of the farms at Port Howard and North Arm. During the Falklands War, it was the scene of the Battle of Goose Green.

== History ==
Goose Green was established in 1875, as the site of a tallow factory.

According to the 1911 Encyclopædia Britannica, at the turn of the 20th century, many of the local inhabitants were Scottish, which in part is reflected by the nearby placename, Brenton Loch. There were thirteen people recorded as residents at that time. At about this time, Goose Green began to take off:

A canning factory was opened in 1911 at Goose Green, and was extremely successful for nine years. It absorbed a large proportion of surplus sheep, but during the slump of the postwar years, the concern suffered a serious loss and in 1921 it closed down.

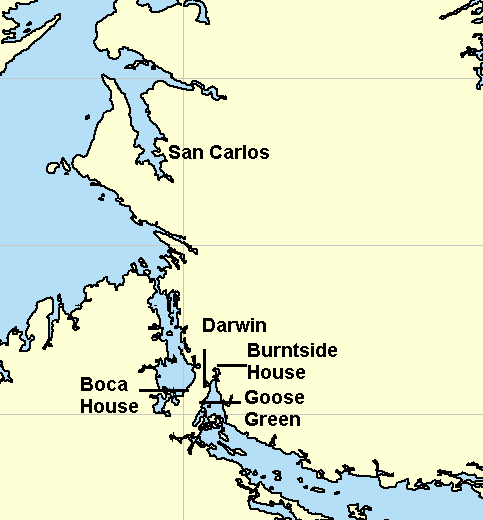

Despite this setback, the settlement grew after it became the base for the Falkland Islands Company's sheep farm in Lafonia in 1922 - the population rose to nearly 200, with improved sheep handling and wool shed being built. In 1927, the settlement's huge sheep shearing shed was built, which is claimed to be the world's largest, with a capacity of five thousand sheep. However, this claim is hard to verify. In 1979, 100,598 sheep were shorn at Goose Green.

Up until the 1970s, Goose Green was the site of a boarding school, run by the state. "Camp" children boarded here, and there were 40 spaces. The boarding school was later transferred to Stanley, although the recent emphasis has been on locally based education. The school itself became an Argentine HQ, and was burnt down. A new (day) school has been built for local children.

The town population has shrunk since the Falklands War. In 1982, there were a hundred residents; in 2000 there were forty. It is now part of the Falkland Landholdings Corporation, a government-managed company.

There are two listed buildings here, the Stone Cottage, and the village hall.

The area is home to the Falkland Islands radar antenna array, part of the Super Dual Auroral Radar Network (SuperDARN), an international radar network for studying the upper atmosphere and ionosphere. The array, comprising 16 50-foot masts, began work in 2010.

=== Falklands War ===
Goose Green was occupied by Argentine forces during the Falklands War. Over one hundred islanders were imprisoned in the community hall, while over 1,200 Argentine troops occupied the settlement and nearby Darwin.

On 28–29 May 1982, it was the subject of the first land battle of that conflict (see Battle of Goose Green), as it was relatively close to the site of the British landings, San Carlos, and the British leaders were looking for an early victory, even if the site was not necessarily of military importance.

== See also ==
- Battle of Goose Green
  - Chris Keeble
  - Ítalo Piaggi
