= Lafonia =

Peninsula on East Falkland

Coordinates: 52°00′28″S 59°23′38″W

Location of Lafonia within the Falkland Islands.

Lafonia is a peninsula forming the southern part of East Falkland, the largest of the Falkland Islands.

== Geography and geology ==
Map of the Falkland Islands.

Shaped like the letter "E", it is joined to the northern part of the island by an isthmus that is almost 2.5 kilometres (1.6 mi) wide. Were this isthmus to be severed, Lafonia would be the third largest of the Falkland Islands. Falkland Sound runs to the west between Lafonia and West Falkland. Choiseul Sound divides Lafonia from the northern part of East Falkland, which is still unnamed.

Barren Island, Bleaker Island, George Island, Lively Island, Sea Lion Island and Speedwell Island are all off Lafonia.

The geology of north west Lafonia is Permian, and similar to that of parts of Ecca Pass in South Africa. The plain of Lafonia is constituted by arenaceous sediments of the Lafonia Group. Depressions in the sediments formed where they were cut vertically by basalt dikes.

In the 21st century, Lafonia has seen gold prospecting by Falkland Gold and Minerals Ltd.

== History and population ==
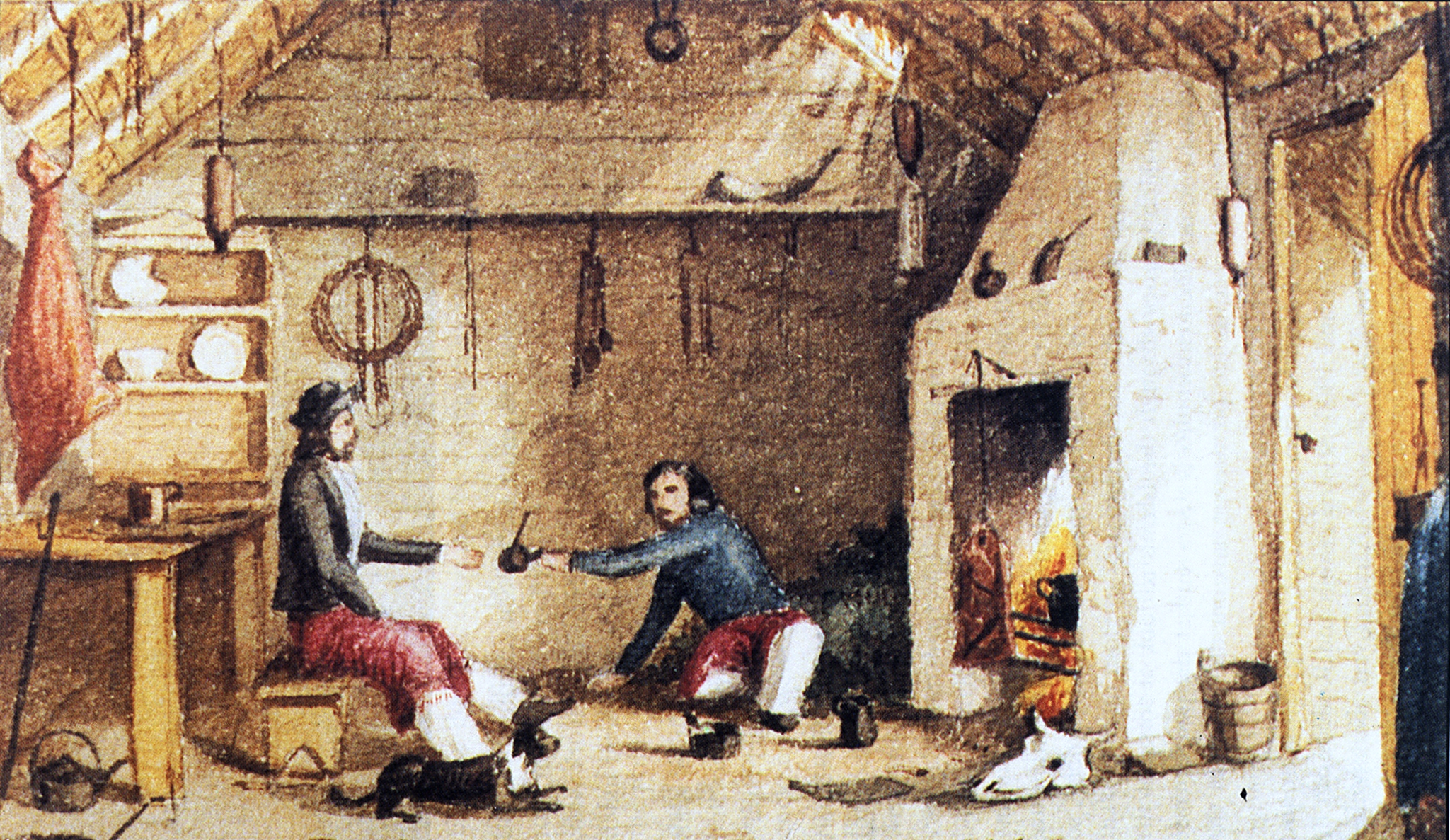
Falkland gauchos having mate at Hope Place - Saladero, East Falkland. Watercolour by Dale, manager of Hope Place in the 1850s.

The land is gentle and low-lying, but almost uninhabited, falling into the "camp" category. Most of its settlement occurred in the mid 19th century.

In 1845, Mr Samuel Fisher Lafone, a British-born wealthy cattle and hide merchant on the river Plate, obtained from government a grant of the southern portion of the East Falkland, which was a peninsula 600,000 acres (2,400 km^{2}) in extent, and possession of all the wild cattle on the island for a period of six years, for a payment of £10,000 down, and £20,000 in ten years from 1 January 1852. In 1851, Mr Lafone's interest in Lafonia, as the peninsula came to be called, was purchased for £30,000 by the Falkland Islands Company, which had been incorporated by charter in the same year.

Lafonia has been used for sheep farming since the early nineteenth century. It is run from Darwin (founded 1859) and Goose Green, both of which are located on the narrow isthmus that separates Lafonia from the rest of East Falkland. North Arm Settlement is the only substantial settlement in Lafonia (not counting offshore islands), along with Walker Creek. Attractions include the Bodie Suspension Bridge, built in 1925 and said to be the southernmost in the world. There is also a shop here. Listed buildings in Lafonia include The Galpon and Stone Corral in Darwin, The Stone Cottage and Goose Green Hall (owned by Falklands Landholdings) in Goose Green and Paragon House.

The first battles on land during the Falklands War took place on Lafonia (see Battle of Goose Green), where over a thousand Argentine personnel were stationed and around one-hundred locals were imprisoned in the community hall. The area is now home to an Argentine Military Cemetery. Parts of Lafonia, especially near Darwin and Goose Green, are still heavily mined.

Other settlements include Port King, Egg Harbour, and the abandoned Hope Place.

== Wildlife ==
Charles Darwin surveyed the area's wildlife during his now-famous voyage on HMS Beagle.

Lafonia's wildlife includes the Chiloé wigeon, silver teal and yellow-billed pintail. Introduced brown trout are found in at least one stream flowing into Choiseul Sound. There is also a population of zebra trout.
