= Darwin, Falkland Islands =

Darwin
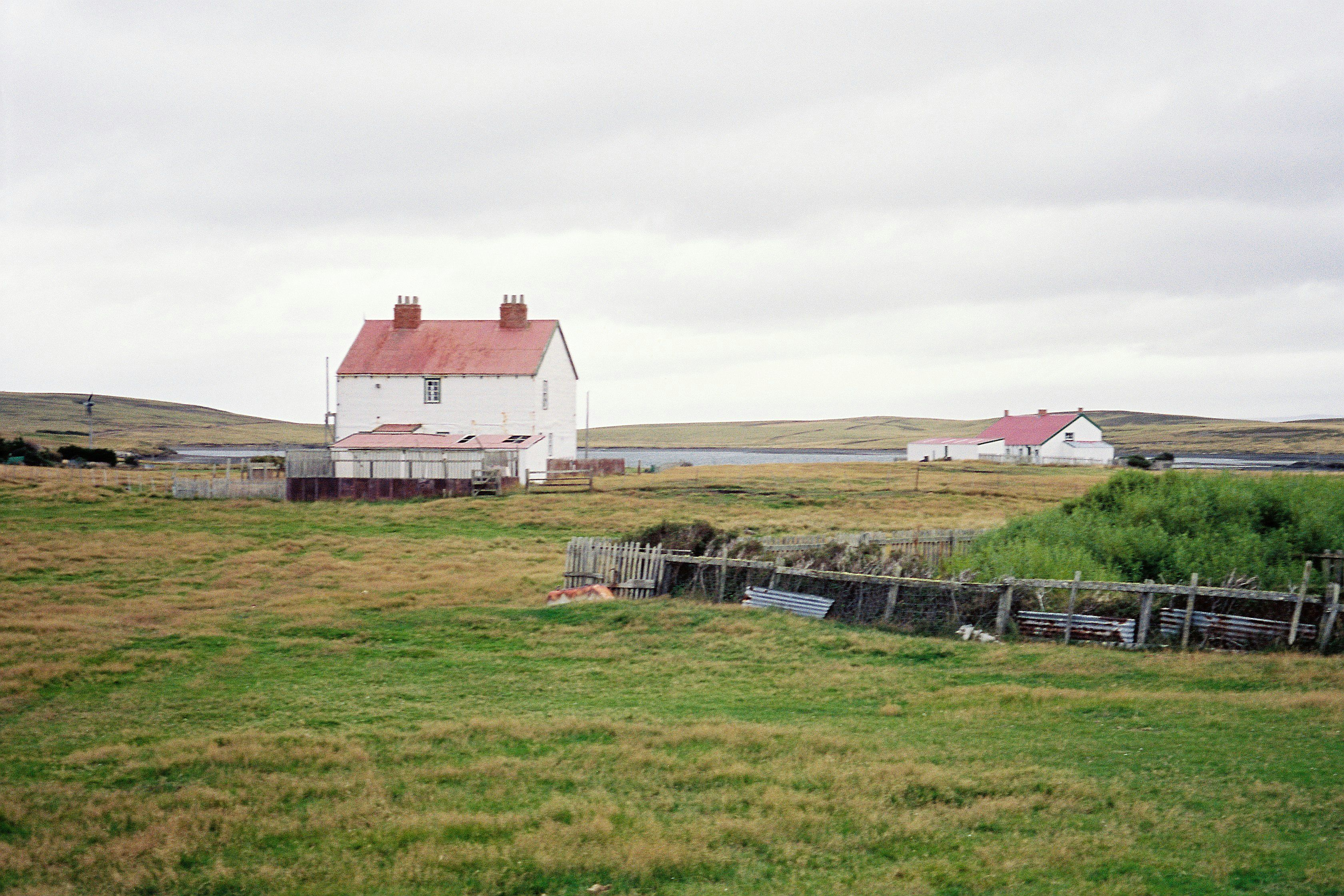
- Darwin in 2003

- Location of the Falkland Islands

- Location in the Falkland Islands
- Coordinates: 51°48′24.8″S 58°57′31.3″W
- British Overseas Territory: Falkland Islands
- Region: East Falkland
- Settled: 1859

Population
  - Total: 7
- Climate: ET

Darwin is a settlement in Lafonia on East Falkland, Falkland Islands, lying on Choiseul Sound, on the east side of the island's central isthmus, 2.5 miles (4.0 km) north of Goose Green. It was known occasionally (and still is from time to time) as Port Darwin.

Attractions in Darwin include a corral, the Galpon building which was home to nineteenth-century gauchos, the Argentine Military Cemetery, and birdlife both in the Sound and the pond. There is also a small racecourse here, for local amateur and hobby horse riders.

== History ==
It is named after Charles Darwin, who carried out a zoological survey of the Falkland Islands on the Beagle's second voyage. Darwin was said to have spent the night here.

Approximately quarter of a century after Charles Darwin's visit, the settlement of Darwin was founded. The first building, erected in 1859, was the vicarage. It was started as the centre for sheep farming in Lafonia, which it remained until 1922. The farm was then transferred to Goose Green, south of Darwin and separated by the Boca Wall of peat, which grew to overshadow Darwin. Darwin was initially the haunt of gauchos, and cattle farmers, but sheep farming came to dominate the area, and Scottish shepherds were brought in.

A few years later, the first large tallow works in the islands (though not the first) was set up by the FIC in 1874. It handled 15,891 sheep in 1880.

From the 1880s, until 1972, Darwin and Fox Bay had their own separate medical officers. Nowadays, most medical care is based in Stanley.

A telephone line was constructed between Darwin and Stanley in 1906, with the ship Consort landing poles on the coast. The Darwin line was finished in 1907, at a length of 49.5 miles (79.7 km). The line was initially only for business, but the public could make calls from time to time. It suffered a few breakages in the early years of operations.

The Darwin Harbour Sports Association organised one of the earliest reported Cricket matches in the Falklands on February 7, 1912. It was between the teams of married and single men. The Single men won on that occasion.

There are two listed buildings here, the galpon and the Stone Corral.

=== Falklands War ===
Darwin and environs saw heavy fighting in the Falklands War during the Battle of Goose Green. A large number of Argentine casualties were buried near here.

On the morning of May 28, British troops from the 2nd PARA Regiment took Darwin Hill after fierce fighting with Argentine forces.

The GADA detachment, unaware of the situation, observed several platoons advancing down the southern slopes of the ridge. Identifying them as British, GADA 601 section engaged them in direct-fire mode. The 35 mm bursts blocked the advance of the leading companies of the 2nd PARA Regiment, who suffered a number of casualties. C Company bore the brunt of the Argentine fire, the Headquarters section of C Company was effectively put out of action and 20% of the Company were injured, including the commander, Major Roger Jenner, and his signallers. The rear platoon, attached from A Company, was forced to remain behind Darwin Hill for the rest of the battle.

The last direct-fire mission of GADA 601’s section targeted the Darwin school-house, a position recently taken by troops of D Company. The building was already on fire due to the use of white phosphorus grenades by the British, it was then systematically destroyed by 35 mm rounds and burnt to the ground, resulting in further casualties for the paratroopers.

The British advance from this area was eventually halted on the orders of Major Chris Keeble who decided to stop the advance in order to consolidate his position.

Shortly after, the GADA position was subjected to mortar fire, and the power generator of the guns was damaged beyond repair. A later Harrier strike was inaccurate and failed to hit the GADA 601 position, as corroborated by a British account of the action. The mortar barrage, however, forced the section to seek shelter. With the garrison now isolated and surrounded, the Argentine commanding officer chose to surrender the following day.
