= Battle of Two Sisters =

1982 engagement of the Falklands War

Coordinates: 51°41′12″S 58°1′25″W

- Part of the Falklands War
Date	11–12 June 1982
Location	Two Sisters Ridge, Falkland Islands
Result	British victory

Belligerents
United Kingdom	Argentina

Commanders and leaders
(United Kingdom) Lt. Col. Andrew Whitehead	(Argentina) Maj. Ricardo Cordón

Units involved
3 Commando Brigade: 40 Commando; 45 Commando; 29th Commando Regiment; 59 Independent Commando Squadron; (United Kingdom) Royal Navy	4th Infantry Regiment; 6th Infantry Regiment

Strength
600 Royal Marines; 6 light guns 1 destroyer (HMS Glamorgan)	350; 4 fighter-bombers

Casualties and losses
22 killed 47 wounded 1 destroyer damaged 3 helicopters damaged	20 killed 50 wounded 54 captured

The Battle of Two Sisters was a night attack by British Royal Marines on Argentine positions during the Falklands War. It took place on 11–12 June 1982 on Two Sisters, a ridge with two peaks near Stanley. It was one of three battles fought that night as part of a brigade-sized operation, alongside the Battle of Mount Longdon and the Battle of Mount Harriet. 45 Commando, supported by artillery and by naval gunfire from HMS Glamorgan, attacked Argentine troops from the 4th Infantry Regiment. After hard fighting, especially on the southern peak, the Argentine defenders withdrew. The marines took both peaks, but a planned second advance on Mount Tumbledown was cancelled. Eight British personnel were killed. HMS Glamorgan was hit by an Exocet missile while staying on station to support the marines, and 14 of her crew died. The capture of the high ground opened the way to Port Stanley, and the Argentine forces on the islands surrendered soon after.

== Prelude ==
=== Composition of forces ===
The British force, commanded by Lieutenant-Colonel Andrew Whitehead, comprised the Royal Marines of 45 Commando, supported by the anti-tank troop from 40 Commando and six 105 mm guns of 29 Commando Regiment. The 2nd Battalion, Parachute Regiment (2 Para) was held in reserve. Naval gunfire support was provided by the twin 4.5-inch (114 mm) guns of HMS Glamorgan.

45 Commando was instructed to seize Two Sisters Mountain under cover of darkness, and to continue onto Mount Tumbledown if time permitted. However, Argentine resistance proved stiffer than anticipated, and the second phase of the attack was cancelled.

The Argentinian force originally occupying Mount Challenger was commanded by Major Ricardo Cordón and consisted of the 4th Infantry Regiment or RI 4. The bulk of the defenders were drawn from C Company, with the 1st Platoon (Sub-Lieutenant Miguel Mosquera-Gutierrez) and 2nd Platoon (Sub-Lieutenant Jorge Pérez-Grandi) positioned on the northern peak of Two Sisters, and the 3rd Platoon (Sub-Lieutenant Marcelo Llambías Pravaz) on the southern peak. The 1st Platoon of A Company (Sub-Lieutenant Juan Nazer) and the Support Platoon (Second Lieutenant Luis Carlos Martella) were located on the saddle between the peaks.

Major Óscar Jaimet’s B Company of the 6th Mechanized Infantry Regiment or RI Mec 6, acted as the local reserve, and occupied the saddle between Two Sisters and Mount Longdon. In early June, Jaimet’s company was reinforced by the Support Platoon under Second Lieutenant Marcelo Dorigón, drawn from B Company of the 12th Regiment (RI 12). This platoon had remained on Mount Kent after the rest of B Company had been helicoptered forward during the Battle of Goose Green.

== No-Man's-Land ==
Night of 11 to 12 June, west of Stanley

On 2 June, the 4th Regiment's Operation Officer, Captain Carlos Alfredo López-Patterson, arrived to help in the defence of Two Sisters. He would visit the rifle platoons in order to maintain the defenders informed and raise morale:

In those visits, one thing that always moved me was that, while I saluted Second Lieutenant Llambias Pravaz, the soldiers in that platoon would clap and they cheered. It must have been because they noticed that I was recognizing the valour they were acquiring in that place. Because they were very isolated, waiting for the enemy, just them and their souls. Or, perhaps, because seeing their commander who is going to share a few words - a brotherly gesture of a young man towards other young people - they felt their desire revived to fight. One day, a lad approached me and said "Since we have got to dance in this one, we are going to do it well. We are going to support the Second Lieutenant who has fallen sick and still remains with us. We have got to help the one whose feet get cold or the one who freaks out. Because from here we all leave together or no one leaves at all". What could I say?

On 4 June, the three rifle companies of 45 CDO advanced on Bluff Cove Peak, on the lower slopes of Mount Kent, and were able to occupy the feature without opposition and were met by patrols from the Special Air Service (SAS). On the night of 29 May, a fierce firefight had developed over capturing the two important hills, as they were intended to form part of an Argentine Special Forces line.

Captain Andrés Ferrero's patrol (3rd Assault Section, 602 Commando Company) reached the base of Mount Kent but were then promptly pinned down by machinegun and mortar fire. First-Sergeant Raimundo Máximo Viltes was badly wounded when a bullet shattered his heel. Air Troop had two SAS men wounded by rifle fire.

Two SAS men had been flown in with gunshot wounds that were quite obviously more than 24 hours old. We knew better than to ask them about the circumstances of their injuries, and instead simply operated on them. The anaesthetist, Malcolm Jowitt, used Ketalar, in injectable and steroid-based general anaesthetic that had some occasional and highly interesting side effects. One of the SAS men, a big ex-Sapper, came from round his op and started singing bawdy rugby songs, quite tunefully, at the top of his voice!

Probing attacks around the D Squadron, SAS positions continued throughout the night and at 11:00 am local time on 30 May, about 12 Argentine Commandos (Captain Tomás Fernández's 2nd Assault Section, 602 Commando Company) tried to get up the summit of Bluff Cove Peak, but were driven off by D Squadron who killed two of the attackers, First Lieutenant Rubén Eduardo Márquez and Sergeant Óscar Humberto Blas.

First Lieutenant Márquez and Sergeant Blas had shown great personal courage and leadership in the contact and were posthumously awarded the Argentine Medal of Valour in Combat. During this contact, the SAS suffered another two casualties from grenades after the Argentine Commandos had stumbled on a camp occupied by 15 SAS troopers.

Suddenly there was a burst of firing, and the distinct crack of at least one grenade going off ... One of the blokes took splinter wounds from the grenade in his back and was brought up to our position to be looked after ... The other casualty's shrapnel wounds were unpleasant but not serious.

Throughout 30 May, Royal Air Force Harriers were active over Mount Kent. One of them, responding to a call for help from D Squadron SAS, was badly damaged by small arms fire while attacking Mount Kent's eastern lower slopes. Sub-Lieutenant Llambías-Pravaz's platoon was later credited with the destruction of Harrier XZ963 flown by Squadron Leader Jerry Pook with another claim going to 35 mm Oerlikons of the 601st Anti-Aircraft Artillery Group under the command of 2nd Lieutenant Roberto Enrique Ferre.

"During another action, an enemy aircraft fell victim to the 601 Air Defence's 35mm batteries. The plane came down in the water and the pilot, Squadron Leader Pook was rescued shortly after."

The Harrier crashed into the South Atlantic 30 miles from the carrier HMS Hermes, Squadron Leader Pook ejected and was rescued. On 5 June, two Royal Air Force Harriers operating from 'Sids Strip', the San Carlos Forward Operating Base, attacked the Argentine defenders on Two Sisters with rockets around midday.

The two GR3s remained until 11.30 am when they took off to rocket Argentine troops positions on Two Sisters.

A heavy mist hung over the Murrell River area, which assisted the 45 Commando Recce Troop to reach and sometimes penetrate the Argentine 3rd Platoon position under Subteniente Marcelo Llambías-Pravaz. Marine Andrew Tubb of Recce Troop later recalled:

We were actually inside the Argentine position, so we ended up shelling ourselves. We did a lot of patrols up to Two Sisters ... that time [6 June] we pepper-potted [fire and maneouver] for about 400 metres to get out the 3rd Platoon Sergeant, Juan Domingo Valdez, had launched a counter-ambush., through the Argy lines, firing 66mm rockets to fight through and regroup. We got artillery again to smoke us out. It took us well over an hour to get away and it seemed like a few minutes. We killed seventeen of them, and all we had was one bloke with a flesh wound.

(2 Army privates, Jose Romero and Andres Rodriguez and three sappers of a Marine mine-laying party were actually killed.)

For his patrol action, Lieutenant Chris Fox received the Military Cross, while Subteniente Llambías-Pravaz was able to pilfer and sport a Commando Beret that the Royal Marines had left behind during the Argentine counter-ambush. In general terms, the Argentines were thoroughly entrenched, about 6,000 metres or less across no-man's-land. The Argentine positions were mined and heavily patrolled.

The 4th Regiment also carried out patrolling, and on the night of 6–7 June, Corporal Oscar Nicolás Albornoz-Guevara along with eight conscripts (including Private Orlando Héctor Stella, his pathfinder) from Subteniente Miguel Mosquera-Gutierrez's 1st Platoon crossed Murrell River and reached the area of Estancia Mountain where they detected a number of British vehicles, but the patrol soon came under mortar fire from 3 PARA and had to withdraw.

On 8 June, Corporal Hugo Gabino MacDougall of B Company, 6th Regiment, claimed to have shot down a Harrier using a shoulder-launched Blowpipe missile. The British confirm the loss of a GR.3 Harrier (XZ989) on that day, following an emergency landing at San Carlos due to battle damage. The pilot, Wing Commander Peter Squire walked away uninjured and XZ989 was scrapped post-war.

Harrier GR.3 XZ989 was stripped for spares and repatriated to the UK. In March 1983, it was assessed as beyond economical repair and allocated for ground-instructional duties at RAF Gütersloh in West Germany. The airframe was later scrapped following the closure of RAF Gütersloh in 1993.

The 12th Regiment Support Platoon under Subteniente Dorigón attached to Major Oscar Jaimet's B Company would reportedly live off the land. Private Ángel Ramírez:

We ate raw sheep, we would butcher sheep and place it on flames. You know that the soil in the Malvinas Islands is like coal, it is black turf, you dig a hole, light a fire, and it is all like petrol, everything burns. We ate barbecued sheep, we ate it half raw and cooked.

Major Jaimet says he made sure the conscripts in his rifle company got enough meat for he authorized his men to shoot and butcher sheep and fry their edible remains over camp fires among the boulders behind British view.

At about 2.10 am local time on 10 June a strong 45 Commando fighting patrol probed the 3rd Platoon position. In the ensuing fight, Special Forces Sergeants Mario Antonio Cisneros and Ramón Gumercindo Acosta were killed; two more Argentine Special Forces lying in ambush for the Royal Marines were wounded. The British military historian Bruce Quarrie later wrote:

A constant series of patrols were undertaken at night to scout out and harass the enemy. Typical was the patrol sent out in the early hours of the morning of 10 June. Lieutenant David Stewart of X-Ray Company, 45 Commando, had briefed his men during the previous afternoon, and by midnight they were ready. Heavily armed, with two machine-guns per section, plus 66 mm rocket launchers and 2-inch mortars, the Troop moved off stealthily into the moonlit night towards a ridge some four km away from where Argentine movement had been observed. Keeping well spaced out because of the good visibility, they moved across the rocky ground using the numerous shell holes for cover, and by 04.00 [1 am local time], were set to cross the final stretch of open ground in front of the enemy positions. Using a shallow stream for cover, they moved up the slope and deployed into position among the rocks in front of the Argentine trenches. With the help of a light-intensifying night scope, they could see sentries moving about. Suddenly, an Argentine machine-gun opened fire and the Marines launched a couple of flares from their mortar, firing back with their own machine-guns and rifles. Within seconds three Argentine soldiers and two [Royal] Marines were dead. Other figures could be seen running on the hill to the left, and four more Argentine soldiers fell to the accuracy of the Marines' fire. By this time, the Argentine troops further up the slope were wide awake, and a hail of fire forced the [British] Marines to crouch in the shelter of the rocks. The situation was becoming decidedly unhealthy and Lieutenant Stewart decided to retire, with the objective of killing and harassing the enemy well and truly accomplished. However, a machine-gun to the Marines' right was pouring fire over their getaway route, and Stewart sent his veteran Sergeant, Jolly, with a couple of other men to take it out [They knew they were cut off with what looked a poor chance of escape. In these circumstances any panic or break in morale and the game was up]. After a difficult approach with little cover, there was a short burst of fire and the Argentine machine-gun fell silent. Leapfrogging by sections, the Troop retreated to the stream, by which time the Argentine fire was falling short and there were no further casualties.

— Bruce Quarrie, The Worlds Elite Forces, pp.53-54, Octopus Books Limited, 1985

Major Aldo Rico, commander of the 602 Commando Company, had a lucky escape in this engagement, when an enemy 66mm projectile exploded uncomfortably close to him and First Lieutenant Horacio Fernando Lauría. Captain Hugo Ranieri, who took part in this intense engagement as a specialist sniper, claims that First Lieutenant Jorge Vizoso-Posse, although wounded, shot three of the retreating Royal Marines in the back. First Lieutenant Horacio Fernando Lauría and Sergeant Orlando Aguirre claim to have destroyed a British machine-gun with rifle-grenades in this engagement.

On that same night (9–10 June), according to the British Ministry of Defence, a friendly fire incident occurred when Royal Marines returning from a reconnaissance patrol were mistaken for Argentines in the dark and a British mortar team opened fire on them. In the confusion, four Royal Marines (Sergeant Robert Leeming, Corporals Andrew Uren, Peter Fitton and Marine Keith Phillips) were killed and three were wounded. The next day, Sub-Lieutenant Llambías-Pravaz's men recovered the rucksacks and weapons the Royal Marines had left behind, and these were presented as war trophies to Argentine war correspondents in Port Stanley who filmed and photographed the British equipment.

The Mountain and Arctic Warfare Cadre also carried out patrolling against Two Sisters; Sergeant Joseph Wassell and Lieutenant Fraser Haddow played an important part in the capture of the mountain when they discovered with their binoculars from their observation post on Goat Ridge, the command-detonated barrels of mines the Argentinian Marine engineers (under the direction of Major Jaimet) had dug in and planned to use on the saddle and eastern half of the mountain.

On 11 June, several GR-3 Harriers took off from San Carlos airbase to drop cluster bombs on Mounts Longdon, Harriet and Two Sisters Mountain.

The Argentine Medical Officer with the 6th Regiment's B Company, First Lieutenant Alejandro Steverlynck reports that one Argentine soldier was killed during the final British air attack on Two Sisters and that he had to comfort with the assurance his wounds were minor and that he would now have a warm hospital bed and be able to watch the 1982 FIFA World Cup in Stanley Hospital before the young soldier died in his arms a short time later, but not before obtaining a smile from the dying man before the morphine that was applied took any real effect.

== Night battle ==
Captain Ian Gardiner's X-Ray Company spearheaded the assault on Two Sisters, accompanied by the unit's Commando-trained chaplain, the Revd Wynne Jones RN. Lieutenant James Kelly's 1 Troop secured the western third of the spineback on the southern peak ('Long Toenail') without opposition. However, at 11:00 pm local time, Lieutenant David Stewart's 3 Troop encountered stiff resistance on the spineback and was unable to advance. After their attempt to dislodge the Argentine 3rd Platoon failed, Lieutenant Chris Caroe's 2 Troop launched a follow-up attack, but were beaten back by artillery fire called in by the Argentine Forward Observation Officer, Sub-Lieutenant Javier Tagle, of the 4th Airborne Artillery Group.

For nearly four hours, X-Ray Company remained pinned on the slopes. British softening-up fire swept back and forth across the high ground, but the Argentine 3rd Platoon under Second Lieutenant Llambías-Pravaz, supported by a section from Mario Pacheco's 10th Engineer Company and shouting Guarani war cries, repelled all attempts to dislodge them. The position was finally cleared at about 2:45 am.

Recognising that a single company could not secure Two Sisters before dawn, Lieutenant Colonel Andrew Whitehead brought up the battalion’s remaining two rifle companies. At about 12:30 am local time, Yankee and Zulu Companies began their assault on the northern peak of Two Sisters, known as 'Summer Days'. In a hard-fought engagement lasting two hours, the Marines faced two well-positioned Argentine rifle platoons under Subtenientes Mosquera-Gutiérrez and Pérez-Grandi. Despite sustained heavy machine-gun and mortar fire, they succeeded in capturing the summit.

Argentine mortar platoon commander Lieutenant Martella, who had already expended much of his ammunition attempting to stop 42 Commando’s advance on Mount Harriet, was killed during this phase of the battle. Two British platoon commanders were wounded in the bombardment, and a Royal Engineer attached to clear booby traps was killed. Marine Chris Cooke later recalled: "The three officers in my company pledged to have a drink together at the other end of the island, but only one made it, the other two left with shrapnel wounds."

Zulu Company platoon commander Lieutenant Clive Dytor was awarded the Military Cross for rallying 8 Troop and leading a bayonet charge to take the peak. Reflecting on the moment, he said:

"I began listening to our rate of fire and I realised we were going to run out of ammunition. Then I remembered a line in a book about the Black Watch in the Second World War. They were pinned down and the adjutant stood up and shouted, 'Is this the Black Watch? Charge!’ What I didn’t remember, until I read it again later, was that he was actually cut in half at that point by a German machine gun. The next thing I knew I was up and running on my own, shouting, 'Zulu, Zulu, Zulu,’ which was our company battle cry and also the battle cry of my father’s old regiment, the South Wales Borderers."

Second Lieutenant Aldo Eugenio Franco and his RI 6 platoon, having abandoned a planned counterattack in conjunction with Major David Carullo’s Panhard armoured car squadron, because Argentine forces no longer held the peaks of Two Sisters, provided covering fire for the withdrawal and prevented Yankee Company from attacking C Company during its retreat.

Augusto Esteban La Madrid, a second lieutenant in the local reserve who had been tasked with supporting Major Cordon, told historian Martin Middlebrook that during the final stages of the action, "Subteniente Franco's platoon was left as a rearguard, but he made it back to Tumbledown OK."

Private Oscar Poltronieri, who delayed Yankee Company with accurate fire from his rifle and a machine gun, was awarded the Argentine Nation to the Heroic Valour in Combat Cross (CHVC), Argentina’s highest decoration for bravery.

Sub-Lieutenant Nazer had been wounded while covering the withdrawal. The remnants of his platoon, placed under the command of Corporal Virgilio Rafael Barrientos, later occupied positions on Sapper Hill. Sub-Lieutenants Mosquera-Gutiérrez and Pérez-Grandi were also wounded during the British bombardment, and their remaining troops were placed under the command of Captain Carlos López Patterson, the 4th Regiment’s Operations Officer. He established blocking positions between Mount Tumbledown and Wireless Ridge alongside the dismounted 10th Armoured Cavalry Reconnaissance Squadron, under Captain Rodrigo Alejandro Soloaga. These forces engaged forward elements of 3 PARA, notably A Company on Mount Longdon, with heavy machine-gun and mortar fire during 12 and 13 June. This pressure eventually forced No. 3 Platoon (Lieutenant David Wright) to withdraw from the eastern summit.

After securing Two Sisters, 45 Commando came under retaliatory fire from surrounding Argentine positions. Captain Gardiner’s X-Ray Company reported Corporal Frank Melia wounded during the daylight hours of 12 June, after attracting mortar fire originating from Tumbledown Mountain. Several Marines sheltering in abandoned Argentine bunkers on Two Sisters were incapacitated due to near-misses from Argentine shellfire including 105mm OTO Melara and 155mm CITER L33 rounds. Although the bunkers provided some protection, repeated shock waves from close impacts caused temporary and, in some cases, permanent hearing loss.

On 13 June, two Argentine A-4 Skyhawk from Grupo 5, attacked vehicles and helicopters stationed near 3 Commando Brigade Headquarters, located on the lower western slopes of Two Sisters near the Murrell River. The raid resulted in one helicopter crewman injured and significant damage to three Gazelle helicopters.

The attack, involved one Skyhawk dropping bombs while the second strafed with 20 mm cannon fire. The damage was confined to helicopters and nearby vehicles, one crewman suffered a blast wound and perforated eardrums, another a mild concussion. Overall disruption to 3 Commando Brigade operations was limited, though the damage did cause delays to 2 PARA's preparations for the following evening’s assault.

On the morning of 14 June, as 45 Commando positioned on the forward slopes of Two Sisters prepared to reinforce the Welsh Guards consolidating on Sapper Hill, a Snowcat tracked vehicle from 407 Transportation Troop entered a minefield. The driver dismounted to warn following vehicles of the danger, but stepped on an anti-personnel mine, sustaining severe injuries that required evacuation by helicopter.

== Naval bombardment ==
Naval gunfire support was provided by HMS Glamorgan's twin 4.5-inch (114 mm) guns. The naval gunfire officer accompanying the Royal Marines had been wounded early in the battle for Two Sisters, but Bombardier Edward Holt from 29 Commando Regiment Royal Artillery, took over and continued to give swift and accurate directions to the destroyer and was subsequently awarded the Military Medal.

On the night of the battle Glamorgan was asked to remain in action longer than planned, to help Yankee Company clear Subteniente Aldo Franco's rifle platoon on the eastern half of Two Sisters covering the Argentine withdrawal. As the destroyer took a short cut closer to the shoreline a RASIT radar of the Argentinian Army tracked her movements.

Two MM38 Exocet missiles had been removed from the destroyer ARA Seguí and secured on launcher, dubbed 'ITB' (Instalación de Tiro Berreta) "trashy firing platform". The missiles, launcher, transporter, and associated electronics trailer were flown by transport aircraft to the Falkland Islands on 31 May.

At 0336 local time, the British skipper, Commander Ian Inskip, looking at the radar screen, realized that Glamorgan was under attack by an anti-ship missile, and ordered a highspeed turn just before the Exocet struck the port side adjacent to the hangar. The missile skidded on the deck and detonated, making a 10 by 15 feet (3.0 m × 4.6 m) hole in the hangar deck and a 5 by 4 feet (1.5 m × 1.2 m) hole in the galley area below, where a fire started.

The blast travelled forwards and down, and the missile, penetrated the hangar door, causing the ship's Wessex helicopter (HAS.3 XM837) to explode and start a severe fire in the hangar. Fourteen crew members were killed and about twenty wounded.

== Aftermath ==
The next morning Colonel Andrew Whitehead looked in wonderment at the strength of the positions the enemy had abandoned. "With fifty Royals," he said, "I could have died of old age holding this place." (Max Hastings, Going To The Wars, p. 363, Macmillan 2000) Similarly, Martin Middlebrook concluded that the Argentines had been driven out of their positions too easily, inflicting only 14 casualties on the Royal Marines.According to then Captain Giles Orpen-Smellie, the intelligence officer from 3 PARA, the British had suffered eight killed and seventeen wounded taking Two Sisters including casualties during the patrol actions but not including losses suffered at sea in support of 45 Commando. Although the British unit seemed at the time to have had an easy victory, those actually engaged with the enemy platoons would have been unlikely to agree. Marine Nick Taylor that fought for the southern peak of Two Sisters as part of X-Ray Company explained in a 2012 interview with a major British newspaper that it was the “ferocity and superior firepower of the British forces (that) gained the advantage and the Argentinians retreated”. British field artillery guns had provided heavy and constant support in the night attack, firing some 1,500 rounds in support of the attacking Royal Marines from 45 Commando.

Thirty years later, Marine Keith Brown recalled the fighting for the northern peak and concluded

My impression of a night attack was that it was nothing like I expected it to be – in terms of a fairly ordered affair with people running and taking out machine-gun nests. It was just hugely confusing. It was fairly arbitrary as to who seemed to be injured – lots of bangs and flashes and very loud noises. You had naval artillery and mortars and heavy and light small arms fire as well. It was terrifying, to be honest. I don’t know how my colleagues felt. We were pretty much pinned down and we came under direct fire from the Argentinians. Up to that point, it was all to do with artillery and mortar rounds, but this was direct fire and they were using what seemed to us to be tracers, which was pretty daft. So, you could see where their fields of fire were and we were down low on the ground.

British-American historian Hugh Bicheno has been critical of the 6th Infantry Regiment's 'B' Company who, he claims, withdrew in a disorderly manner from front-line positions at the opening of the battle, although this seems to have little foundation. Brigadier-General Oscar Luis Jofre had certainly been planning to counterattack on Two Sisters but with the defenders no longer in possession of the twin peaks, he ordered the abandonment of the feature and later wrote All of a sudden, we suffer the first emotional impact. It was 04.45 when we received reports from Major Jaimet saying that the defenders on Two Sisters could no longer resist the enemy attack and would begin their withdrawal. Major Oscar Ramón Jaimet has gone on record, saying in the Argentinean newspaper La Gaceta that he had designated Sub-Lieutenant Franco to cover the Argentinean withdrawal and that Argentinean artillery fire was brought down in error amongst the company. Indeed, the company withdrew in good order, according to the Spanish-speaking warrant officer attached to 3 Commando Brigade Headquarters in the fighting. The Argentine Army Official Report on the war recommended Major Oscar Ramon Jaimet and CSM Jorge Edgardo Pitrella of the 6th Regiment's B Company for an MVC (Argentine Nation to the Valour in Combat Medal) for the conduct of their fighting withdrawal and subsequent behaviour on Tumbledown (this was later granted to Major Jaimet, Pitrella was awarded the Argentine Army to the Effort and Abnegation Medal).

Sergeant-Major George Meachin of Yankee Company later praised the fighting abilities and spirit of the Argentine defenders of the northern peak in the form of the men of Pérez-Grandi and Mosquera-Gutierrez:

We came under lots of effective fire from 0.50 calibre machine guns ...At the same time, mortars were coming down all over us, but the main threat was from those machine-gunners who could see us in the open because of the moonlight. There were three machine-guns and we brought down constant and effective salvos of our own artillery fire on to them directly, 15 rounds at a time. There would be a pause, and they'd come back at us again. So we had to do it a second time, all over their positions. There'd be a pause, then 'boom, boom, boom,' they'd come back at us again. Conscripts don't do this, babies don't do this, men who are badly led and of low morale don't do this. They were good steadfast troops. I rate them.

Hugh Bicheno described the moonscape of devastation:

Although Wireless Ridge and the saddle between Tumbledown and William are still heavily scarred, even after more than twenty years the beaten zone between the Two Sisters bear the most eloquent witness to the awesome power of the British artillery, which fired 1,500 shells at the Two Sisters that night. The still-churned area occupied by Nazer's platoon in particular leaves one in no doubt why they decamped immediately, while the saddle itself is dimpled with craters, testimony to the tenacity of Martella's Heavy machine guns and mortars.

— Hugh Bicheno, Razor's Edge: The Unofficial History of the Falklands War, p. 242, Weidenfeld & Nicolson, 2006

With the telephone lines to the command post in shreds, Llambías Pravaz led his men to join M Company, 5th Marine Infantry Battalion on Sapper Hill. He had nearly been killed in the fighting when a rock impacted his helmet after a Milan missile exploded close behind him.

The X-Ray Company Marines were in awe of the Argentines in the depleted 3rd Platoon who had put up such determined resistance, and their company commander, Captain Gardiner in the book Above All, Courage (Above All, Courage: The Falklands Front Line: First-Hand Accounts, Max Arthur, pp. 389–390, Sidwick & Jackson, 1985) later said:

A hard cadre of some twenty men had stayed behind and fought, and they were brave men. Those who stayed and fought had something. I for one would not wish to face my Marines in battle.

Some 30 years later, Marine Nick Taylor of X-Ray Company got in contact with Sub-Lieutenant Marcelo Llambías-Pravaz, and in a televised reunion on the southern peak of the mountain, he returned the pictures he had found of the army officer and his platoon of conscripts the morning after the Royal Marines had stormed the position.

=== Casualties ===
Seven Royal Marine Commandos and a sapper from 59 Independent Commando Squadron, Royal Engineers were killed taking Two Sisters. Another 17 British marines in 45 Commando, including platoon commanders (Lieutenants Fox, Denning and Davies) were wounded. 20 Argentines were killed in the first eleven days of June and the night of the battle, with 50 wounded and 54 taken prisoner.

HMS Glamorgan, which was providing Naval gunfire support (NGS) stayed in her position to support the Royal Marine Commandos who were pinned down. HMS Glamorgan stayed past the time she was meant to leave and was hit by a land-based Exocet missile, fourteen crew were killed and more wounded as a result of this attack.

=== Awards and citations ===
Argentine forces

- Cross for Heroic Valour in Combat to Private Oscar Poltronieri
- “La Nación Argentina al Valor en Combate” to:
  - First Lieutenant Rubén Márquez †, 602 Commando Company
  - First Sergeant Oscar Blas †, 602 Commando Company Fb
  - Sergeant Sergio García †, 25th Infantry Regiment
  - Corporal Mario Castro †, 25th Infantry Regiment
  - Private Fabricio Carrascull †, 25th Infantry Regiment

All are buried at the Argentine Military Cemetery.

British forces

- Distinguished Service Order to Lieutenant-Colonel Andrew Whitehead
- Military Cross to:
  - Lieutenant Clive Dytor
  - Lieutenant Christopher Fox
  - Lieutenant David Stewart
- Distinguished Conduct Medal to Corporal Julian Burdett
- Military Medal to:
  - Corporal Andrew Bishop
  - Corporal D. Hunt
  - Marine Gary W. Marshall
  - Corporal Harry Siddall
- Military Medal to supporting units:
  - Bombardier Edward Holt, 29 Commando Regiment RA
  - Sergeant J D Wassel M&AW Cadre
- Mentioned in Despatches: Corporal Christopher Brown, Lieutenant Christian Caroe, Captain Michael Cole
