= Battle of Mount Kent =

Battle in the Falklands War

- Part of Falklands War
Date	29 May – 11 June 1982
Location	Mount Kent, East Falkland, Falkland Islands 51.673°S 58.113°W
Result	British victory

Belligerents
United Kingdom	Argentina

Commanders and leaders
(United Kingdom) Lt. Col. Mike Rose (United Kingdom) Maj. Cedric Delves (United Kingdom) Cap. Gavin Hamilton (United Kingdom) Cap. Peter Babbington	(Argentina) Cap. Eduardo Villarruel (Argentina) Cap. Tomás Fernández (Argentina) Cap. Andrés Ferrero

Units involved
22 Special Air Service: G Squadron; 3 Commando Brigade: 42 Commando; 29th Commando Regiment; Blues and Royals; Royal Navy; Royal Air Force	601 Commando Company; 602 Commando Company; 601st Helicopter Battalion; Special Operations Group; 601st National Gendarmerie Special Forces Squadron; 6th Infantry Regiment (B Company)

Strength
1 destroyer (HMS Glamorgan); 1 Scorpion light tank 4 helicopters (1 Chinook, 3 Sea king)	7 helicopters (1 Puma, 4 Hueys, 2 Chinooks)

Casualties and losses
5 killed (4 from friendly fire); 11 wounded (3 Royal Marines, 4 Gurkhas, and 4 SAS); 1 Harrier jump jet	9 killed 18 wounded 5 captured 1 Puma helicopter
- Location within Falkland Islands

The Battle of Mount Kent was a series of engagements during the Falklands War, primarily between British and Argentine special forces.

Mount Kent and the surrounding hills is an area of high ground on East Falkland, five miles West of the capital Stanley. At 1,093 ft (333 m) it dominated the British axis of advance from San Carlos to Stanley and its proximity to the capital, made it of strategic interest to both British and Argentinian Forces.

== Background ==
In late May 1982 Special Air Service patrols from G Squadron found that a number of high peaks overlooking the Argentine defences around Port Stanley were largely undefended, after the Argentine heliborne reserve 'Combat Team Solari' (B Company, 12th Infantry Regiment) had been dispatched to support the fighting at Goose Green and the 4th Infantry Regiment had received orders to abandon Mount Challenger and take up positions on Mounts Two Sisters and Harriet.

An initial reconnaissance by Major Cedric Delves' 'D' Squadron was deployed by helicopter on 25 May, with the remaining of the squadron arriving on 27 May in time to counter the arrival of an Argentine Special Forces unit under the command of Captain Eduardo Marcelo Villarruel, second-in-command of 602 Commando Company. His commander, Major Aldo Rico, had instructed Argentine patrol leaders to move into positions around Mount Kent, secure the area and await reinforcement by Major Jose Ricardo Spadaro's 601st National Gendarmerie Special Forces Squadron, and Major Oscar Ramon Jaimet's heliborne trained. B Company, 6th Infantry Regiment who had also undergone night-combat training the previous year.

SAS patrols from Air and Boat Troops and Major Delves' tactical headquarters (THQ) fought a number of actions with the Argentine Special Forces before the Argentines were forced to withdraw. The SAS's Air Troop patrol was at first driven but managed to hold onto the summit of Mount Kent until Royal Marine reinforcements arrived.

== Battle ==
The first engagement occurred during the night of the 29–30 May 1982 when the 3rd Assault Section of 602 Commando Company, led by Captain Andrés Ferrero, ran into Air Troop from D Squadron, 22nd SAS, on the slopes of Mount Kent, sustaining one badly wounded (First-Sergeant Raimundo Viltes), abandoning much of its equipment to the anger of Major Aldo Rico, their Commanding Officer. The SAS sustained two wounded during the contact. Another SAS man suffered a broken hand in the confusion of battle.

That night, HMS Glamorgan (D19) shelled Wing Commander Esteban Correa's 40-man Argentine Air Force Special Operations Group (GOE) at Stanley Airfield guarding the Skyguard fire-control radars, killing Lieutenant Luis Castagnari and wounding four others who were preparing to take part in the occupation of Smoko Mount in support of Argentine Army commandos. The Argentine survivors thought the missile was a Shrike anti-radar missile, but it was a Seaslug missile launched in the surface to surface role.

The next day, around 11.00 local time, Captain Tomás Fernández's 12-man, 2nd Assault Section attempted to seize Bluff Cove Peak. The radio operator, First Sergeant Vicente Alfredo Flores, sent out the following radio message from the slopes of Bluff Cove Peak at about 5 PM on 30 May: "We are in trouble" and then forty minutes later: "There are English all around us... you had better hurry up".

First Lieutenant Rubén Eduardo Márquez and Sergeant Oscar Humberto Blas were both killed and showed great personal courage in the firefight and were posthumously awarded the Argentine Nation to the Valour in Combat Medal. The Argentine Commandos under Captain Fernández confronted a camp occupied by 15 SAS troopers, with the SAS reporting two wounded (Corporals Ewen Pearcy and Don Masters) repelling Fernández's patrol.

On Mount Simon, Captain Jose Arnobio Verseci's 1st Assault Section, listening to Captain Fernández's patrol attempt to escape British encirclement, decided to abandon the feature and attempt to link up with the platoon under Lieutenant Darío Horacio Blanco from the 601st Combat Engineer Company that was guarding Fitzroy.

That following day, another SAS ambush took place when Lieutenant-Commander Dante Camiletti's Marine Special Forces patrol (minus Camilletti and Corporal Juan Carrasco who had been captured at Verde Mountain and Teal Inlet respectively) were returning from reconnoitring San Carlos and were ambushed by Captain Gavin Hamilton's Mountain Troop on the lower slopes of Estancia Mountain. Sergeants Jesús Pereyra and Ramón López were seriously wounded and captured along with Corporals Pablo Alvarado and Pedro Verón who were unwounded. During their reconnaissance of San Carlos, a British gunner, (George Joblin) was shot and wounded by friendly fire.

On the night of 30 May, Captain Peter Babbington's K Company of 42 Commando, Royal Marines and a supporting field artillery battery boarded three Sea King helicopters and the surviving RAF Chinook (Bravo November) and moved forward from San Carlos. At about the same time, the 2nd Assault Section under Captain Fernández, having hidden all day, emerged from their hides intending to withdraw from the area under the cover of darkness but came under prompt and heavy fire from Mountain Troop. The Marines took cover and after the firefight had died down Major Cedric Delves of D Squadron, 22 SAS appeared and assured them that all was well. There were no Argentine casualties, although one member, Sergeant Vicente Alfredo Flores with the Thompson Manpack Radio, was captured after knocking himself out in a fall. One Spanish-speaking British Intelligence Corps NCO on loan to the SAS is reported wounded in this action. The SAS claim to have come under mortar bombardment while evacuating their wounded, and the Royal Marines from 7 'Sphinx' Battery of the 29th Commando Regiment Royal Artillery report the loss of one gunner (Van Rooyen), who suffered a broken arm while taking cover among the rocks during the bombardment.

Flight-Lieutenant Andy Lawless, the co-pilot of the sole surviving RAF Chinook, took part in the mission to deliver artillery guns and ammunition to the SAS and describes the crash of the helicopter as a result of severed wires;

We had three 105-mm guns inside and ammunition pallets under-slung. Then the fog of war intervened, we could not find anywhere to land and spent time manoeuvring as we had to put them exactly where the gunners wanted because they could not roll the guns across the terrain. Once we dropped off the guns we went straight back to San Carlos to bring in more guns and ammo. Then we hit the water at 100 knots. The bow wave came over the cockpit window as we settled and the engines partially flamed out. I knew we had ditched but I was not sure if we had been hit. Dick said he thought we had been hit by ground fire. As the helicopter settled the bow wave reduced and the engine wound up as we came out of the water like a cork out of a bottle.

The action in the Mount Kent area continued on the morning of 31 May, the recently arrived Royal Marines spotted Major Mario Castagneto's 601 Commando Company advancing on jeeps and motorbikes to rescue the stranded patrols of 602 Commando Company. Castagneto's men were forced to withdraw after coming under mortar fire injuring Castagneto and Drill Sergeant Juan Salazar.

There were aircraft losses on both sides from operations carried out by British and Argentine Special Forces. On 30 May, Royal Air Force Harriers were active over Mount Kent. One of them, responding to a call for help from D Squadron SAS, was badly damaged by small arms fire while attacking Mount Kent's eastern lower slopes. Sub-Lieutenant Llambías-Pravaz's platoon was later credited with the destruction of Harrier XZ963 flown by Squadron Leader Jerry Pook with another claim going to 35 mm Oerlikons of the 601st Anti-Aircraft Artillery Group under the command of 2nd Lieutenant Roberto Enrique Ferre that had been moved forward to cover the retreat of the 4th Regiment that had been occupying Mount Challenger, according to Captain José Fernando Trindade from the 601st Air Defence Artillery Group. The Harrier crashed into the South Atlantic 30 miles from the carrier HMS Hermes, Squadron Leader Pook ejected and was rescued.

At about 11.00 am on the same day, an Aerospatiale SA-330 Puma helicopter was shot down by a shoulder-launched Stinger surface-to-air missile (SAM) fired by the SAS. Six National Gendarmerie Special Forces were killed and eight injured.

Before the end of May, according to Marine First Corporal Horacio Núñez, the 1st Amphibious Commando Grouping (under Lieutenant Commander Guillermo Sanchez-Sabarots) embarked on two Argentine Air Force Fokker F-27 Friendship turboprop transports to reinforce the Argentine Army Commandos and National Gendarmerie Special Forces attempting to take over control of the Mount Kent area. The Marine Special Forces NCO recalls "We were given the orders to carry out a counterattack. And we got on board the Fokkers but the two landings had to be aborted." This is corroborated by Marine First Corporal Jacinto Eliseo Batista in the lead transport that says the Fokker had to practically abort the landing while flying over the runway that was under heavy naval bombardment.

During the remainder of the month, Lieutenants Luis Antonio Longar and Marcelo Jorge Pinto from the 7th Helicopter Group in two separate missions were able to find and extract two parts of a 14-strong patrol from the Special Operations Group operating near San Salvador Water.

The only British death in the SAS operations to counter Argentine commando patrols in the Mount Kent area, occurred when a SAS patrol fired on an SBS patrol near Teal Inlet who had strayed into an area patrolled by the SAS in the early hours of 2 June. SBS Sergeant Ian ‘Kiwi’ Nicholas Hunt was killed.

The Special Air Service won praise for defending Mount Kent and the surrounding peaks, the citation for the Distinguished Service Order won by Major Delves:

Following the successful establishment of the beachhead in San Carlos Water, Major Delves took his squadron 40 miles behind enemy lines and established a position overlooking the main enemy stronghold in Port Stanley where at least 7000 troops were known to be based. By a series of swift operations, skilful concealment and lightning attacks against patrols sent out to find him, he was able to secure a firm hold on the area after ten days for the conventional forces to be brought in.

After sustaining significant losses in the form of four wounded (Carl Rhodes, Richard Palmer, Don Masters and Ewen Pearcy) in 16 and 17 Troops and a fifth SAS casualty that had broken his hand taking cover in the fighting, the exhausted men in Air and Boat Troops were withdrawn from the frontline for much-needed rest and replaced by 23 Troop, G Squadron SAS. 18 and 19 Troops, in the meantime, commenced operations against the Argentine garrisons at Fox Bay and Port Howard in West Falkland. Mount Kent would come under sporadic but intense Argentine long-range 155 mm artillery fire with Kim Sabido from Independent Radio News reporting on 31 May, "For me it was just another version of hell and the shower of shrapnel which accompanied each explosion was just a reminder of how close to the margins of life these men are now fighting. Kim Sabido with the British forces overlooking Port Stanley."

Brigadier Julian Thompson would later defend his decision to send SAS patrols to reconnoitre Mount Kent ahead of 42 Commando:

It was fortunate that I had ignored the views expressed by Northwood [British Military Headquarters in England] that reconnaissance of Mount Kent before insertion of 42 Commando was superfluous. Had D Squadron not been there, the Argentine Special Forces would have caught the Commando before de-planing and, in the darkness and confusion on a strange landing zone, inflicted heavy casualties on men and helicopters.

A Scorpion tank from the Blues & Royals helped clear Mount Kent from the remaining Argentine special forces and engaged the 4th 'Monte Caseros' (Jungle) Infantry Regiment troops digging in on the lower slopes of Two Sisters Mountain, opposite Murrell River.

3 PARA reached Estancia House on 1 June, and shortly thereafter D Company patrols came across blood stains and field dressings indicating that the wounded First Sergeant Raimundo Viltes under the care of First Lieutenant Horacio Lauría had received first aid there along with the Argentine Marine special forces wounded and National Gendarmerie commandos injured, before they were evacuated. In their march to Estancia House, a British paratrooper in D Company was seriously wounded by a negligent discharge.

With 23 Troop thinly spread in the forward British lines, the 3rd Assault Section from 602 Commando Company was able to return to the area on the night of 3–4 June, reaching the summit of Mount Challenger after a difficult approach. Upon returning to Port Stanley, Major Aldo Rico along with First Lieutenant Jorge Manuel Vizoso-Posse, (second-in-command of Ferrero's patrol) tried to convince Brigadier-General Oscar Jofre to helicopter forward a rifle company in order to attack the recently arrived British artillery batteries the commandos claimed to have located using their night binoculars, but an irritated Jofre told them to go and leave the decision-making process up to 10th Brigade Headquarters.

The Argentine 4th Regiment also carried out patrolling, and on the night of 6–7 June, Corporal Nicolás Albornoz-Guevara with eight conscripts from the Two Sisters Mountain stronghold crossed Murrell River and reached the area of Estancia Mountain where they spotted a number of British vehicles, but the patrol came under mortar fire and had to withdraw.

On 9 June, the two Argentine Air Force Boeing CH-47 Chinook helicopters in the Falklands returned to the Argentine mainland. The plan was to collect Major Armando Valiente's 75-strong 603 Commando Company together with petroleum shaped charges which had been seized from a French company operating in southern Argentina and insert this force behind Mounts Kent and Challenger in order to attack British artillery.

== Aftermath ==
With the loss of the high ground, Argentine Air Force Canberra bombers carried out several bombing runs against British troops in the area. In the first raid on June 1, six Canberras attacked British troop positions in the Mount Kent area after Captains Ferrero and Villarruel were given a map of the area and told to pinpoint the British positions.

On 8 June, a British helicopter inserted a 3-man special forces team to establish an observation post on Mount Kent but were discovered and long-range Argentine artillery fire wounded one man, forcing the remainder to vacate their hide and retreat with their wounded man to the rear positions of the 29th (Commando) Royal Artillery Regiment.

During the night of 9–10 June, a Royal Marines night-fighting patrol fired on several members of a mortar platoon from 45 Commando on the lower slopes of Mount Kent, killing four and wounding three British Marines. According to Captain Ian Gardiner, the company commander of 45 Commando Battalion's X-Ray Company, the sergeant commanding the fighting patrol spotted the mortar section approaching from the direction of the enemy positions in the valley between Mount Longdon and Two Sisters Mountain and ordered his men to open fire believing them to be an Argentine Special Forces patrol.

Early on 10 June, a Gurkha company moved forward from Bluff Cove to a position near Mount Kent to establish a patrol base but the Forward Observation Officer on Mount Harriet, Captain Tomás Fox spotted the company and directed 155 mm artillery fire against it, wounding four Gurkhas. On 11 June, the Royal Marine and Parachute battalions of 3 Commando Brigade attacked and captured Mounts Longdon, Harriet, Goat Ridge and Two Sisters Mountain, ending Argentine Special Forces plans (Operational Plan No. SZE-21) in winning back control of the Mount Kent area.
