= Poltronieri =

Poltronieri is a surname. Notable people with the surname include:

- Brandon Poltronieri (born 1986), American-born Costa Rican footballer
- Oscar Poltronieri (born 1962), Argentine former soldier, Cross for Heroic Valour in Combat
- Rayan Poltronieri Pereira (born 1989), Brazilian footballer
