= 25th Infantry Regiment (Argentina) =

Argentine military unit

25th Mechanised Infantry Regiment
- Regimiento de Infantería Mecanizado 25
- Active: 1943
- Country: Argentina
- Branch: Army
- Type: Regiment
- Part of: IX Mechanised Brigade
- Garrison/HQ: Army Garrison Sarmiento
- Nickname: Los Bravos del 25 (in English: The Brave Ones of the 25th)
- Engagements: Falklands War; Battle of Goose Green

The 25th Mechanized Infantry Regiment is a unit of the Argentine Army, part of the 9th Mechanized Brigade within the 3rd Army Division, and is based in Sarmiento, Chubut, Argentina. The regiment is known for its role in the Falklands War, during which it became the first Argentine Army unit to land in the Falkland Islands during the 2 April 1982 amphibious invasion. Upon landing, elements of the regiment were tasked with securing key positions around Port Stanley, including the airport and surrounding roads. A platoon was assigned to clear abandoned vehicles and concrete blocks obstructing the runway at Stanley Airport, ensuring it could be used by Argentine aircraft.

Throughout the conflict, the regiment operated under the command of Lieutenant-Colonel Mohamed Alí Seineldín who had undergone training as a Ranger under the supervision of US Korean War Veteran Major William Cole, was entrusted with the defence of Stanley Airport. C Company, led by Paratroop-trained First Lieutenant Carlos Daniel Esteban, was deployed to man outposts in key locations including Goose Green and San Carlos, alongside detachments from the 12th Infantry Regiment. Esteban later stated that his men were well cared for in the early stages of the war, telling historian Isidoro Jorge Ruiz-Moreno: “My men were never forced to stay in their wet foxholes except when there was an air raid or when the battle came closer. But before the English landed, I made sure that my troops were warm, safe and well fed.”

The 25th Regiment remained in the Falklands until the end of the war, participating in various engagements and patrol operations. It returned to mainland Argentina following the Argentine surrender on 14 June 1982.

== History ==
In 1943 the 25th Infantry Regiment was created as part of the Patagonia Group. It was first headquartered in the town of Las Heras, Santa Cruz. In December 1943 the town of Puerto Deseado became the barracks of the 25th Regiment. On 31 August 1943 the town of Sarmiento, Chubut became the long term barracks of the 25th Regiment, and is also shared with the 9th Armored Artillery Squadron.

In the mid-1970s the 25th Infantry Regiment deployed officers and other ranks in the fighting taking place in Tucumán Province between military/police units and left-wing guerrillas/radicals.

The 25th Regiment was a member of Group B that traveled to the Tucumán province by order of the Commanding General of the Army to reinforce the V Infantry Brigade that carried out Operation Independence. Group B took turns with Group A and C, created for the same purpose.

In 1977, the 25th Infantry Regiment dispatched the Combat Team “Águila” to the city of Campana, Buenos Aires, to integrate with the Task Force “Campos”. The unit was made up of personnel from the three companies of the regiment and totaled 30 Officers and 141 soldiers.

=== Falklands War ===
Operation Rosario was the Argentine amphibious invasion of the Falkland Islands on 2 April 1982, ordered by the military junta that had ruled the country since 1976. The islands had been under British control since their occupation in 1833.

Argentine forces removed the British administration and established military rule. The operation, planned since December 1981 under the leadership of Leopoldo Galtieri, began with an expeditionary force sailing in March 1982. The landing on 2 April was largely unopposed, though one Argentine soldier was killed during the seizure of Government House. The Argentine commander achieved his objectives without casualties among British personnel or civilians, as ordered by the junta to support diplomatic efforts. The small British garrison was defeated, and Governor Rex Hunt was deported with his staff.

On April 3, the United Nations Security Council passed Resolution 502, which ordered:

1. The immediate cessation of hostilities
2. The immediate withdrawal of all Argentine forces from the Falkland Islands
3. The governments of Argentina and the United Kingdom to come to a diplomatic solution to their differences and to fully obey the aims and principles of the Charter of the United Nations

15 out of 30 countries voted in favor of the resolution, one more than the necessary minimum. The Argentine dictatorship did not expect this. With the exception of Panama, the members of the Movement of Non-Aligned Countries voted against Argentina while the Soviet Union, Spain, Poland, and China abstained.

That same Saturday April 3, the government of the United Kingdom launched Operation Corporate, under the care of Task Force 317, in order to recapture the archipelagos.

The 25th Regiment was the only Argentine Army unit to take part in the amphibious landings. One platoon was tasked with clearing abandoned vehicles and concrete blocks from Stanley Airport. During the war, its CO, Lieutenant-Colonel Mohamed Alí Seineldín, was responsible for defending the airport. C Company, under First Lieutenant Carlos Daniel Esteban, established outposts at Goose Green and San Carlos, alongside elements of the 12th Infantry Regiment. Esteban told military historian Isidoro Jorge Ruiz-Moreno: “My men were never forced to stay in their wet foxholes except when there was an air raid or when the battle came closer. But before the English landed, I made sure that my troops were warm, safe and well fed.”

Actions

- On 1 May, a Westland Lynx helicopter from HMS Alacrity (F174) assisting Royal Navy ships in the bombardment of Port Stanley was hit by small arms fire from a rifle platoon of the 25th Regiment, commanded by Second Lieutenant Guillermo Eduardo Laferriere dug in on Mount Low.
- During the British landings on 21 May, a platoon under Second Lieutenant Subteniente Jose Alberto Vasques from Combat Team Güemes formed largely from C Company, 25th Regiment shot down two Gazelle helicopters near Fanning Head.
- Contrary to claims of Argentine war crimes, Sergeant Andy Evans was mortally wounded while still in his helicopter before it crashed into San Carlos Water during the Falklands War. And Co-pilot Sergeant Edgard Candlish was not shot while struggling in the water, but instead successfully dragged the already wounded Evans from the wreckage before escaping to safety.
- Sub-Lieutenant Roberto Oscar Reyes, commanding part of the combat team on Fanning Head, later withdrew to avoid a SBS encirclement. The knowledge that Reyes and his platoon remained hidden in the vicinity of San Carlos resulted in 8 British Paratroopers wounded in a serious gunfight between A and C Companies of 3 PARA on the night of 23/24 May as the Argentines slipped past their positions after crossing a river entrance.
- On 28 May, C Company suffered heavy losses defending Darwin Ridge and Goose Green. During the battle, Lieutenant-Colonel Herbert Jones, CO of 2 Para and the highest-ranking British officer killed in the campaign, died leading an assault on Darwin Ridge. Responsibility is disputed: Corporal Osvaldo Olmos claimed to have shot him with an Argentine-built FAL Para rifle, while conscripts Jorge Ledesma and Guillermo Huircapán said Ledesma, using a FN MAG, first wounded then killed him. Sergeant Barry Norman, one of Jones’s bodyguards, believed the wounds were from machine-gun fire rather than a single round.
- On 11 June, 5 Troop, B Company, 40 Commando Royal Marines, led by Lieutenant Martin Howell, captured Sub-Lieutenant Roberto Oscar Reyes and the remnants of his platoon, who had taken shelter in New House and Moss Side House. Reyes was reportedly suffering from episodes of shaking (an early sign of a severe infection), with three of his men ending up suffering amputations while in British care because of advanced stages of gangrene.
- On the night of 13–14 June, the 25th (Ranger-type) Regiment deployed a mixed company force (under First Lieutenant Miguel Angel Machi) to halt the British advance at Moody Brook.

In recognition to their role in the Falklands War, the regiment's battle flag was awarded the "Medalla de Campaña" of the Argentine Army, "To the flag that fought in the South Atlantic" of the Santa Fe Province and the Medal of the Municipality of Sarmiento.

The 25th Regiment had received Commando training in 1981 and again in February/March 1982, according to the book The Military Sniper Since 1914 (Martin Pegler, Osprey Publishing, 2001), to seize and defend the Falklands. British Warrant Officer Nick Van Der Bijl, who interviewed several key Argentine POWs in the Falklands fighting has written:

When warned that his regiment was earmarked for deployment to the Falklands, Seineldín renamed it the '25th Special Infantry Regiment' although Argentine journalists later christened it the 'Seineldín Commando Regiment'. In defense of the Argentine port at Stanley, he enlarged his regiment to contain five companies of about 100 men each with D (under Captain Hernán Garay) and E (under Captain Eduardo Jesús Olmos) Companies. Most of the Officers and NCOs were commandos or paratroopers, and with a highly trained and motivated Cadre of instructors, he brought out the best of his conscripts in a tough but short commando course.

Van Der Bijl even alleges that a mutiny was at one stage plotted, to replace Brigadier-General Mario Menéndez with Colonel Seineldín of the 25th 'Special' Infantry Regiment.

In his book Malvinas: Un Sentimiento (Editorial Sudamericana, 1999), Seineldín says that it was the Army Green Berets in 601 and 602 Commando Companies who urged him take charge of the Port Stanley garrison, which he rejected with British authors Max Hastings and Simon Jenkins writing:

"The Calvi report prepared by the Army after the war even suggests that a mutiny was plotted to replace Menéndez with Colonel Mohamed Alí Seineldín, of the 25th Infantry Regiment."

After the Argentine surrender at Port Stanley, Lieutenant-Colonel Seineldín in a conversation with a British intelligence officer confirmed that even the recent intake of 18 year-old conscripts that served in the 25th Regiment's D and E Companies had been put through a 60-day compressed commando-course starting in February 1982 in preparation for possible war with Britain.

Across the engagements at San Carlos, Darwin and Goose Green, the 25th Regiment suffered a total of 12 killed in action (one officer, four non‑commissioned officers and seven conscripts) and 35 wounded. Another 53 men in the unit were wounded defending Stanley Airbase from air and naval bombardment. All the dead are interred in the Argentine Military Cemetery to the east of the Darwin Settlement.

=== Gallantry awards ===
Name	Age	Award
Lieutenant Roberto Estévez †	25	La Nación Argentina al Heroico Valor en Combate
Corporal Mario Castro †	19	La Nación Argentina al Heroico Valor en Combate
Private Fabricio Carrascull †	18	La Nación Argentina al Heroico Valor en Combate
Sergeant Sergio García †	23	La Nación Argentina al Heroico Valor en Combate
