= Napoleon's Campaigns in Miniature =

1977 book by Bruce Quarrie

- First edition
- Author: Bruce Quarrie
- Publisher: Patrick Stephens
- Publication date: October 17, 1977
- ISBN: 0-85059-283-6

Napoleon's Campaigns in Miniature:War Gamers' Guide to the Napoleonic Wars, 1796–1815 is a book written by Bruce Quarrie. It concerns wargaming in the Napoleonic era, and provides information on history, weapons, painting, and its own set of rules. It was published on October 17, 1977 by Patrick Stephens with the ISBN 0-85059-283-6. The book remained in print until at least 1992 when the 4th edition was published.

One of the early works on the subject, the book has continued to exert an influence on this period in wargaming. One wargaming site says, "This book (and the rules in it) have been a Bible to many wargamers (and probably still is)".

The rules within were an adapted (and slightly revised) version of L'Empereur - The Wars of Napoleon produced by the North London Wargames Group (of which Bruce was a member) and primarily written by Steve Tulk (who for this troubles, receives a mention in the Campaigns in Miniature acknowledgments). It was, and perhaps still is, a bone of contention with regard to how Bruce Quarrie used the rules without making clear their origins.
