= Clive Dytor =

British academic and headmaster

The Reverend Father Clive Dytor MC (born 1956) was the headmaster of The Oratory School, Woodcote, Oxfordshire, England. A former Church of England clergyman who became a Roman Catholic (like Cardinal Newman who founded the school), he is an MA of both Oxford (theology) and Cambridge (oriental studies) universities.

== Education ==
Dytor was educated at Christ College, Brecon, where he was both a prefect and a member of the Ist XV. He was well regarded for his work ethic, sense of humour and mild eccentricities. He played a leading role in school life and flourished in the Christ College environment which rewarded scholastic and sporting endeavour. Years later he was appointed to the Board of Governors.

Dytor's time as an undergraduate at Trinity College, Cambridge included playing rugby at College and Varsity level, and rowing for the college, winning his oar in his first year.

== Life and career ==
Dytor was born in Cardiff. He served with distinction in the Falklands War, being decorated with the Military Cross for gallantry in action during the Battle of Two Sisters. On the night of 11/12 June 1982, 45 Commando Royal Marines launched a silent night attack against strongly held enemy positions on the craggy hill feature of Two Sisters, ten kilometres to the west of Port Stanley on the island of East Falkland. Initially they progressed onto Two Sisters undetected. However, a fierce fight ensued once they were detected. At the height of the fighting Dytor and his troop were pinned down by enemy fire, he encouraged his troop forward and personally led the assault on a strong enemy machine gun position.

On completing his service with the Royal Marines, he trained for the priesthood in the Church of England at Wycliffe Hall, Oxford, and became chaplain of Tonbridge School. He was married on 17 August 1985 to Sarah Payler. He later became a Roman Catholic and as a layman became a housemaster at St Edward's School, Oxford, prior to his appointment as Head Master of the Oratory School, Reading, where he was in office from 2000 to 2015. He stepped down from his post at the age of 58, after walking the Camino de Santiago from the Pyrenees to the Atlantic.

After a break from work, he took up a position as junior master at Bruern Abbey, a school aimed at people with Dyslexia or other learning difficulties. In that period, he discerned a calling to the Catholic Priesthood and was accepted for Seminary formation in the Archdiocese of Birmingham, studying a part-time bespoke course at St. Mary's College, Oscott between 2018 and 2020.

He was ordained deacon at Oscott on 9 December 2019 by Bishop Mark Davies and ordained priest at St Chad's Cathedral, Birmingham on 12 September 2020 by Archbishop Bernard Longley, 30 years after entering the Anglican ministry.
