= Argentine Military Cemetery =

Military cemetery on East Falkland

The Argentine Military Cemetery on East Falkland
- Falkland Islands (Spanish: Islas Malvinas)
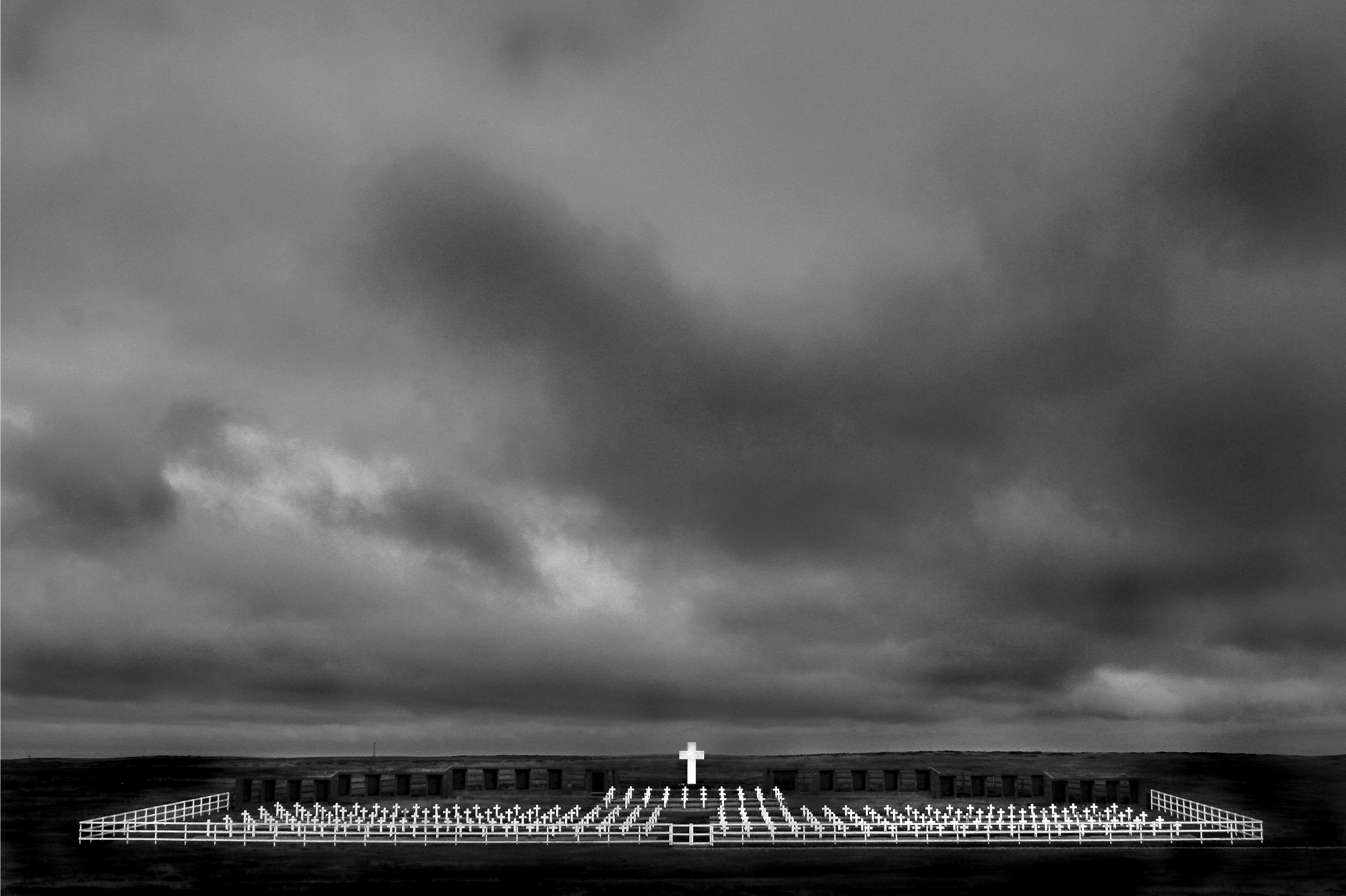
- The Argentine Military Cemetery, on East Falkland; Spanish: Cementerio de Darwin
- For Argentine forces
- Established: 1983
- Location: 51°47′49″S 58°56′26″W; East Falkland near Darwin Settlement
- Total burials: 236
- Unknowns: 5
- Commemorated: 649

Burials by nation
- * Argentina – 236

Burials by war
- * Falklands War – 236

The Argentine Military Cemetery (Spanish: Cementerio de Darwin, lit. Darwin Cemetery) holds the remains of 236 Argentine combatants killed during the 1982 Falklands War (Spanish: Guerra de las Malvinas). It is located at Fish Creek to the east of the Darwin Settlement, the location of the Battle of Goose Green. There is a replica of the cemetery at Berazategui in Buenos Aires Province, Argentina.

== History ==
When the war ended on June 14, 1982, most Argentine bodies were left in temporary graves close to where they fell. Britain offered to send them to Buenos Aires, but the ruling military junta said that they were already in their homeland.

In December 1982, the British government commissioned a firm of civilian undertakers, under the command of British Army Colonel Geoffrey Cardozo, to consolidate all the temporary Argentine graves on the Islands to a single location. Assisted by the armed forces, they identified and documented each Argentine gravesite and brought the bodies to Port Darwin, as at the time this was the largest single Argentine gravesite, with the bodies of the 47 Argentine soldiers killed at the Battle of Goose Green and buried there soon after the battle.

Many of the bodies collected were without dog-tags, so best efforts were made to identify each soldier from personal effects found on the body. Single items were not considered conclusive, but collections were. All were given a Christian burial with full military honours. Each grave is marked by a white wooden cross with the name of the soldier on it, if known, or Soldado Argentino Solo Conocido Por Dios ("Argentine Soldier Known Only By God") if not.

The cemetery is protected by a walled enclosure with a cenotaph, including an image of Argentina's patron saint, the Virgen del Lujan. Surrounding the graves, the names of the 649 Argentine soldiers, sailors and airmen who lost their lives in the conflict are inscribed on glass plaques, with no indication of military rank or service, as requested by their families.

On 9 November 2002, Prince Andrew, himself a Falklands War Veteran, visited the Argentine cemetery and laid a wreath. During the visit, the Prince said, "I lost friends and colleagues and I know what it must be like for the great many Argentines who have shared the same experience."

Although the cemetery is referred to as the Cementerio de Darwin (Darwin Cemetery) in Argentina, the location is several miles from the Darwin settlement and known locally as Teal Creek after a house originally nearby. There are no Argentines interred in the Darwin cemetery which is located in the settlement.

Since the UK-Argentine joint statement on 14 July 1999 Argentine families are responsible for the cemetery's upkeep and, in 2007, Sebastián Socodo, an Argentine married to a Falkland Islander, was employed to do the job of cemetery maintenance.

== Notable interments ==
Name	Unit	Age	Date of death	Award
Lieutenant Roberto Estévez	25th Infantry Regiment	25	28 May 1982	La Nación Argentina al Heroico Valor en Combate
Corporal Mario Castro	25th Infantry Regiment	19	28 May 1982	La Nación Argentina al Heroico Valor en Combate
Private Fabricio Carrascull	25th Infantry Regiment	18	28 May 1982	La Nación Argentina al Heroico Valor en Combate
Sergeant Sergio García	25th Infantry Regiment	23	29 May 1982	La Nación Argentina al Heroico Valor en Combate
Lieutenant Ernesto Espinosa	602nd Commando Company	29	31 May 1982	La Nación Argentina al Heroico Valor en Combate
First Sergeant Mateo Sbert	602nd Commando Company	33	31 May 1982	La Nación Argentina al Heroico Valor en Combate
Lieutenant Rubén Márquez	602nd Commando Company	29	30 May 1982	La Nación Argentina al Valor en Combate
Lieutenant Juan Baldini	7th Infantry Regiment	24	11 June 1982	La Nación Argentina al Valor en Combate

Since the end of the conflict, the bodies of three Argentine pilots have been interred:

- Capitán Jorge Osvaldo García successfully ejected from his Argentine Skyhawk after being shot down by a Sea Dart surface-to-air missile on May 25 but was not recovered from the water. His body was found in a dinghy on Golding Island in 1983.
- Lieutenant Miguel Giménez, a Pucará pilot, whose body was found in 1986. His burial was attended by his family, the first Argentine relatives to visit the Falklands since the end of the war.
- Lieutenant Jorge Casco ^{video}, another Skyhawk pilot, who crashed in bad weather on South Jason Island and was buried on 7 March 2009. In the case of Lt. Casco, his family requested that his remains be buried on the Falklands even after they were returned to Argentina in July 2008 for DNA testing in order to confirm his identity.

=== Repatriation of remains ===
Lieutenant Luis Castagnari was killed on 29 May 1982 and originally buried at Darwin Cemetery. On 4 December 2018, following a formal request from his widow, María, his remains were exhumed, repatriated to Argentina, cremated, and reinterred at the Sagrado Corazón Parish in Río Cuarto, Córdoba.

== Argentine 50 Peso Banknote (2015) ==
In March 2015, the Central Bank of Argentina issued a redesigned 50 peso banknote commemorating Argentina’s claim to sovereignty over the Falkland Islands, South Georgia, and the South Sandwich Islands. Designed and printed by the Casa de la Moneda in Buenos Aires, the note features an outline of the Falkland Islands, the Darwin Cemetery, the cruiser ARA General Belgrano, and Gaucho Rivero, known for leading the Port Louis Murders of 26 August 1833, in which five prominent settlers at Port Louis were killed.

== Vandalism ==
=== 2012 vandalism ===
In July 2012 the glass casing protecting a figure of Argentina's patron saint, the Virgin of Luján, at the head of the cemetery was smashed. Argentina presented a formal protest to the British government and informed the United Nations and the International Red Cross. Sebastián Socodo, an Argentinian-Falklander responsible for the cemetery's upkeep, said families were notified but that as the graveyard is only visited once a month for maintenance it was not clear exactly when it occurred or who the perpetrators were. Police in the Falklands held an investigation and the glass casing was repaired.

=== 2017 vandalism ===
A further act of vandalism was found in January 2017, when the glass was broken and the head of the Virgin of Luján statue damaged. The Argentinian Foreign Ministry made a formal complaint to the British Government condemning the vandalism and calling for an enquiry. A Falkland Islands Government statement described the act as "distressing for the families (of the soldiers) and regretted by the people of the Falkland Islands" and an enquiry was begun by the Royal Falkland Islands Police. Former British Foreign Minister Sir Alan Duncan offered his apologies to the Argentine Government, welcoming the enquiry.

== Identification using DNA ==
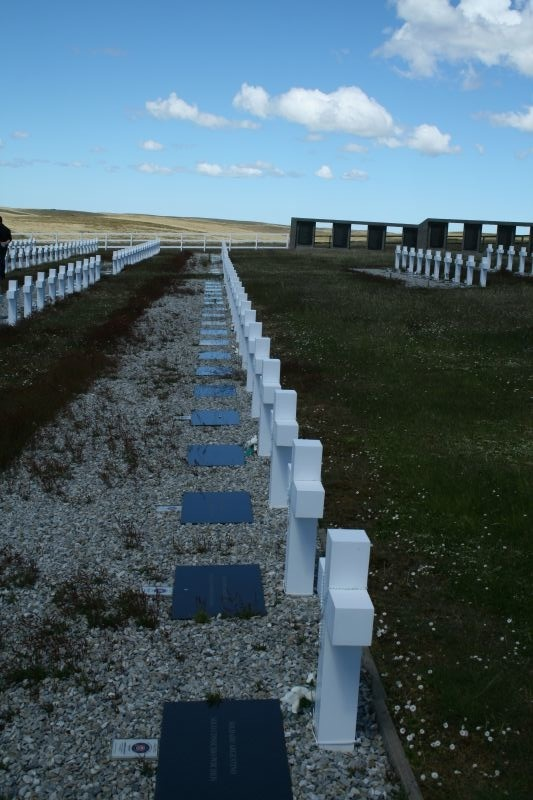
The Cemetery in 2008

As part of a joint humanitarian initiative between the United Kingdom, Argentina, the Falkland Islands Government and the International Committee of the Red Cross (ICRC), a multinational forensic team exhumed, analysed and documented the remains in each of the unidentified Argentine graves at Darwin Cemetery. DNA from these remains was compared with samples voluntarily provided by relatives. The project, launched in accordance with international humanitarian law, was co-funded by the UK and Argentine Governments.

On 13 September 2016, both governments issued a Joint Communication supporting the ICRC-led effort to identify the unknown soldiers. The ICRC's 14-member forensic team began work in June 2017. DNA analysis was primarily carried out by the Argentine Forensic Anthropology Team, with independent verification by laboratories in the UK and Spain.

A third phase of the identification programme (PPH 3) was authorised by the UK and Argentine Governments in the same 2016 communiqué. This phase will focus on recovering remains from collective graves, most notably the crew of LearJet T-24. It will employ advanced forensic techniques, including drone-assisted remote sensing and ground-penetrating radar.

By March 2018, 90 soldiers had been identified, allowing more than 200 relatives to visit the actual graves for the first time. That same month, Argentina's Secretary for Human Rights, Claudio Avruj, visited the cemetery alongside retired British Army Colonel Geoffrey Cardozo, who had originally overseen the burials in 1982. A joint religious service was held, led by Bishop Enrique Eguía Seguí of Buenos Aires and the Right Reverend Abbot Hugh Allan from the UK. Following additional sample collection, the number of positively identified graves rose to 125. A programme agreed with the UK and Falkland Islands Government aims to resolve the remaining five cases.

Five graves still bear the inscription “Soldado argentino sólo conocido por Dios”, as DNA extracted from their remains has not matched any submitted family reference samples. In at least one case, a successful DNA identification was made, but the family declined to have the soldier’s name added to the headstone.

== See also ==
- Blue Beach Military Cemetery at San Carlos – which holds the remains of 14 unrepatriated British servicemen
- Falkland Islands sovereignty dispute#Post-war
- Grytviken Cemetery – which holds the remains of Félix Artuso, an Argentinian submarine officer who was killed in the 1982 British recapture of South Georgia from Argentina
