= Malo River =

River in Falkland Islands

Coordinates: 51.808°S 58.541°W

The Malo River (seen sometimes as Arroyo Malo - also its Spanish name), is a river in East Falkland, Falkland Islands. Its name is derived from the Breton port of St Malo (also the root of "Malvinas" - "Malouines), due to the French settlement established at Port Louis in 1764.

It is situated in the north of East Falkland and flows into Salvador Water off the Wickham Heights in No Man's Land.

A skirmish took place nearby during the Falklands War.
