= Roberto Estévez =

Argentine Army soldier (1957–1982)

Roberto Néstor Estévez (Toto)
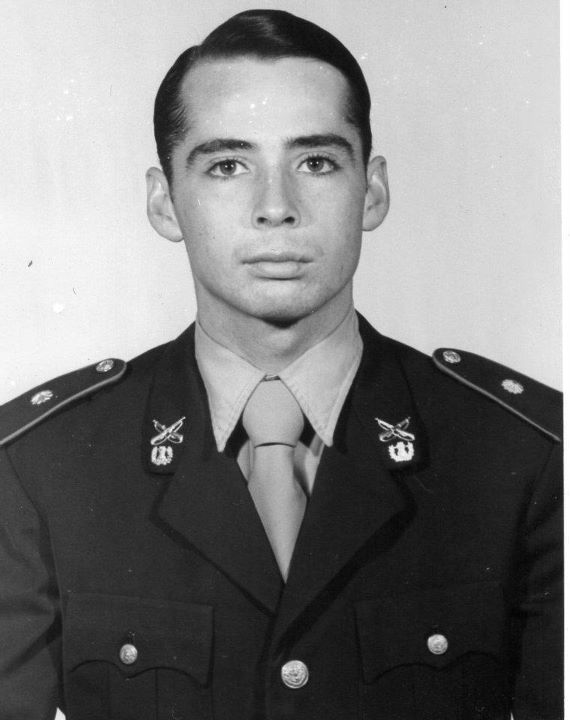
- Born: 24 February 1957; Posadas, Misiones, Argentina
- Died: 28 May 1982 (aged 25); Falkland Islands
- Burial place: Argentine Military Cemetery
- Military career
- Allegiance: Argentina
- Branch: Ejército Argentino
- Service years: 1975–1982
- Rank: First Lieutenant (posthumous)
- Unit: 25th Infantry Regiment
- Conflicts: Goose Green
- Awards: Cross for Heroic Valour in Combat

Roberto Néstor Estévez (24 February 1957 – 28 May 1982) was an officer in the Argentine Army who was killed in action during the Battle of Goose Green in the Falklands War. He was posthumously awarded the Cross for Heroic Valour in Combat, Argentina's highest military decoration.

== Early life and military career ==
Born in Posadas, Misiones, Estévez was the seventh of nine siblings. He attended Escuela Nº 3 "Domingo F. Sarmiento" for primary education and Colegio Nacional Nº 1 "Martín de Moussy" for secondary school. In 1975, he entered the Colegio Militar de la Nación, graduating as a second lieutenant in the infantry in 1978. In 1981, while attending a commando course, Estévez suffered two cardiac arrests but recovered and completed the training.

== Falklands War ==
During the Falklands War, Estévez served with the 25th Infantry Regiment. On 28 May 1982, during the Battle of Goose Green, he led a counterattack to relieve pressure on Argentine positions. Despite being under fire, Estévez moved between positions giving orders and was hit twice, once in the arm and once in the leg, but continued to lead his platoon. Upon reaching another foxhole, he encountered wounded conscript Sergio Daniel Rodríguez and placed the helmet of a fallen soldier on Rodríguez's head for protection. Moments later, Estévez was fatally struck in the cheek by a bullet. Because he was carrying grenades, his body was moved out of the position where it attracted further fire, making it almost unrecognisable.

== Legacy ==
Estévez was posthumously promoted to first lieutenant and awarded the Cross for Heroic Valour in Combat. His remains are buried at the Argentine Military Cemetery in Darwin. In 2022, a plaza was inaugurated in his honour in San Juan Province.

A poignant letter he wrote to his father before departing for the islands has become widely cited as a symbol of personal sacrifice and patriotism.
