= Argentine Army to the Effort and Abnegation Medal =

- Argentine Army to the Effort and Abnegation Ribbon
- Type: Medal
- Awarded for: "acts of Effort and Abnegation"
- Presented by: Argentine Army
- Eligibility: Members of the Argentine Armed Forces
- Status: Currently awarded

The Argentine Army to the Effort and Abnegation Medal is awarded to members of the Argentine Armed Forces.
