= 602 Commando Company =

Argentine military unit

- Compañía de Comandos 602
- Active: 1978-1982; 1982-present (current form)
- Country: Argentina
- Branch: Argentine Army
- Type: Commando
- Size: Company
- Part of: Special Operations Forces Grouping
- Garrison/HQ: Córdoba Province
- Anniversaries: 21 May
- Engagements: Falklands War; Battle of Top Malo House; Battle of Mount Kent

Commanders
- Notable commanders: Maj. Aldo Rico

The 602 Commando Company (Spanish: Compañía de Comandos 602) is a one of three commando (special operations capable) units of the Argentine Army (EA).

== Unit insignia ==
The members of the unit wear green berets with unit badges. The company is divided into three assault sections.

== History ==
Today's unit was created 21 May 1982.

=== Falklands War ===
The unit had its baptism of fire in the Falklands War (2 April–14 June 1982). The commander of the company was 39-year-old Major Aldo Rico.

On the night of 29–30 May, Captain Andrés Antonio Ferrero's 3rd Assault Section attempted to seize Mount Kent but was beaten back in a Special Air Service (SAS) ambush from 16 Air Troop, although wounding two SAS men (Dick Palmer and Carl Rhodes) in the process. Another SAS man suffered a broken hand in the confusion of battle.

On the morning of 30 May, Captain Tomas Victor Fernandez's 2nd Assault Section from 602 Commando Company suffered two killed on Bluff Cove Peak during the Mount Kent Skirmish, First Lieutenant Rubén Eduardo Márquez and Sergeant Oscar Humberto Blas, in an action with 17 Boat Troop and Major Cedric Delves' Tactical Headquarters (including part of the Intelligence Corps) from the British 22nd Special Air Service Regiment (22 SAS Regiment). The dead men were posthumously awarded the Argentine Nation for Valour in Combat Medal for showing great personal courage and leadership in the action. During this contact the SAS suffered two more casualties (Ewen Pearcy and Don Masters) from grenades (including an Intelligence NCO assigned to the SAS). The Argentine commandos literally stumbled on a camp occupied by 15 SAS troopers. That night, Captain Peter Babbington's K Company of 42 Commando, Royal Marines and 7 'Sphinx' Battery from the Royal Artillery arrived nearby via helicopters. At about the same time, the 2nd Assault Section, having hidden all day, emerged from their hides intending to withdraw from the area, but came under prompt and heavy fire from the SAS in the form of Mountain Troop, and lost one NCO (Sergeant Vicente Alfredo Flores) captured. The SAS claim on their part, to have come under mortar bombardment while evacuating their wounded. The British artillery battery report one gunner (Van Rooyen) suffering a broken arm while taking cover among the slippery rocks in the bombardment.

During the Argentine retreat from the Mount Kent area on 30 May, Sergeant Mario Antonio Cisnero from 602 Commando Company and Sergeant Luis Alberto Kovalski from 601 National Gendarmerie Special Forces Squadron, armed with machine guns, repeatedly fired at low-flying Royal Air Force fighter-bombers conducting strafing runs; the British reported the loss of one GR-3 Harrier (XZ 963, piloted by Squadron-Leader Jerry Pook) to small-arms fire.

The 1st Assault Section fought in the Battle of Top Malo House on 31 May 1982. In an action lasting 45 minutes, the Argentine Army Special Forces patrol under Captain José Arnobio Vercesi was defeated and the survivors captured in the encounter with the British Mountain and Arctic Warfare Cadre, a Royal Marines unit, attached to the 3 Commando Brigade (3 Cdo Bde) that reported 3 British badly wounded in the gun battle. Another British Marine (Sergeant McClean) suffered bone bruising when hit in the hand while attempting to fire a 66mm anti-tank rocket.

On the night of 5–6 June Captain Andres Ferrero's 3rd Assault Section dislodged Lieutenant Tony Hornby's 11 Troop, 42 Commando from Mount Wall, that had been calling down softening-up fire on the Mount Harriet defenders. According to Ferrero:

At about 4 in the evening on the 5th, we moved up to First Lieutenant Carlos Alberto Arroyo's command post on Mount Harriet. Major Aldo Rico commanded the patrol. We were as glad to see Arroyo as he was to see us. Dirty, bearded and a little thinner, he gripped Rico in a bear hug. A gallant Commando, Arroyo volunteered to go with us to Mount Wall. Several conscripts came to see us. There was a lot of laughter, some of it nervous, perhaps adrenaline-driven. We had a chance to get a scrumptious and - let us be honest here - very fatty barbecue going and look at the enemy positions at Bluff Cove Rincon and tried to pinpoint the observation post on Mount Wall. A 4th Regiment patrol had been out in the area the night before. Distances were deceptive. In the thin air, Mount Kent seemed close at hand. In nearly every other direction arose outcrops of limestone. Their slopes were not sheer; rather they spread themselves, rugged and inhospitable. It was a very humbling place. We watched 155mm fire falling on the British paratroopers at Bluff Cove Rincon. The weather was appalling, cold and wet with high wind. Few people are aware that we also had the ugly experience of being shelled by the 3rd Artillery Group at one point. It was human error. The plan was to take Mount Wall from the rear. Two artillery batteries were on call, because our route up the feature was very open - a perfect killing ground. By 4 pm it was almost dark and the temperature had sunk. Moving past shell craters and remnants of cluster bombs to the base of Mount Wall, we lay up among boulders while First Lieutenant Lauria cleared a path through the minefields. Altogether it must have taken three hours to get there. It was a moonlit night and cold. I lay there frozen, not moving. Argentinian Artillery fire started coming down on Mount Wall at approximately 10.30pm. Crouching in silence we waited for the fire to end. Some shells fell only 150 metres from us. Then - sudden silence. It ceased and Major Rico screamed to us to go and we advanced uphill through the rocks. A fit commando, if anyone was going to get to the mountaintop first, it would be Lauria but as he swept round a boulder, he came across a straggler or so he thought. It was Major Rico. Who says age slows you down? On the way up we passed the body of a 4th Regiment conscript. Captain Hugo Ranieri knelt down to examine the body and removed the rosary from the young soldier's neck before moving on. We found a laser target designator and several rucksacks. It was the first indication we'd had of how well they had been equipped. There was even a 42 Commando beret.

On 8 June, Private 1st Class Argentino Foremny of the 602 Commando Company Blowpipe Team that Major Rico had sent forward to Mount Harriet, using the zoom sight of his portable surface-to-air missile launcher, reported the presence of two British transport ships (troopships Sir Galahad and Sir Tristram) at Port Pleasant:

In the area of Port Pleasant, about 35 kilometres from our position, we were able to make out the silhouette of two ships that appeared to be transports, no way could they have been Argentine for the British were predominant; we later found out they were Sir Galahad and Sir Tristram. We sounded the alarm and three hours later the first air attack took place. The day ended up being the blackest day for their fleet, as was admitted by the British, with 56 British and 3 Argentines killed.

Captain Ferrero's 3rd Assault Section suffered one killed (Sergeant Mario Antonio Cisnero) and one wounded (First Lieutenant Jorge Manuel Vizoso-Posse), while Captain Eduardo Miguel Santo's supporting National Gendarmerie section suffered another death (Sergeant Ramon Acosta) and another wounded (Sergeant Pablo Daniel Parada) in a fierce action near Murrell River on the night of 9/10 June, seizing much equipment and forcing the attacking Royal Marines platoon to withdraw, with Major Rico belatedly calling down fire support from Lieutenant-Colonel Martin Balza's 3rd Artillery Group in an attempt to cut off the British escape route and take prisoners.

In this action in the early hours of Thursday 10 June 1982, 50 Argentine Army and National Gendarmerie Commandos fought against a reinforced platoon of Royal Marines. One Royal Marine (Corporal Peter Fitton) was reportedly killed by either friendly or defensive mortar fire in the action or in the approach to Murrell River.

According to the British military historian Bruce Quarrie, it was a hard-fought and costly action for both sides:

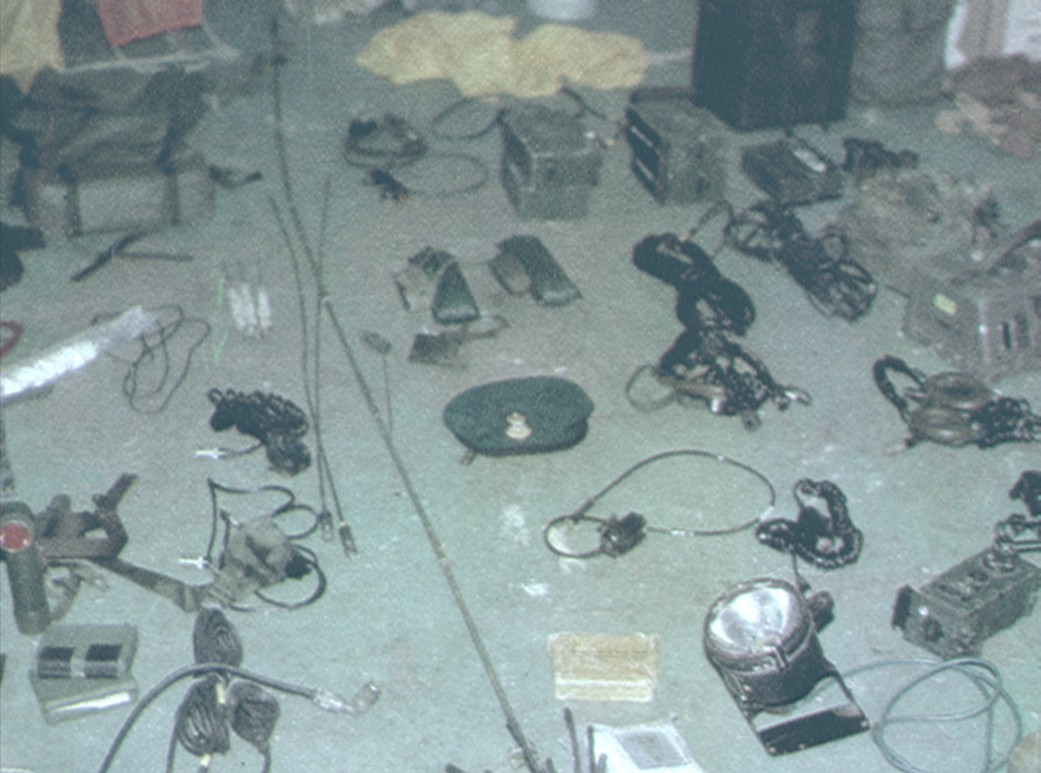
Equipment captured by Argentine army commandos from a 45 Commando Royal Marines fighting patrol near Murrell River, West of Stanley on 10 June 1982

A constant series of patrols was undertaken at night to scout out and harass the enemy. Typical was the patrol sent out in the early hours of the morning of 10 June. Lieutenant David Stewart of X-Ray Company, 45 Commando, had briefed his men during the previous afternoon, and by midnight they were ready. Heavily armed, with two machine-guns per section plus 66 mm rocket launchers and 2-inch mortars, the Troop moved off stealthily into the moonlit night towards a ridge some 4 km away where Argentine movement had been observed. Keeping well spaced out because of the good visibility, they moved across the rocky ground using the numerous shell holes for cover, and by 04.00 [1 am local time] were set to cross the final stretch of open ground in front of the enemy positions. Using a shallow stream for cover, they moved up the slope and deployed into position among the rocks in front of the Argentine trenches. With the help of a light-intensifying night scope, they could see sentries moving about. Suddenly, an Argentine machine-gun opened fire and the Marines launched a couple of flares from their mortar, firing back with their own machine-guns and rifles. Within seconds three Argentine soldiers and two Marines were dead. Other figures could be seen running on the hill to the left, and four more Argentine soldiers fell to the accuracy of the Marines' fire. By this time, the Argentine troops further up the slope were wide awake, and a hail of fire forced the Marines to crouch in the shelter of the rocks. The situation was becoming decidedly unhealthy and Lieutenant Stewart decided to retire, with the objective of killing and harassing the enemy well and truly accomplished. However, a machine-gun to the Marines' right was pouring fire over their getaway route, and Stewart sent his veteran Sergeant, Jolly, with a couple of other men to take it out [They knew they were cut off with what looked a poor chance of escape. In these circumstances any panic or break in morale and the game was up]. After a difficult approach with little cover, there was a short burst of fire and the Argentine machine-gun fell silent. Leapfrogging by sections, the Troop retreated to the stream, by which time the Argentine fire was falling short and there were no further casualties.

Captain Hugo Ranieri, armed with a .300 Weatherby Magnum bolt-action rifle, fought as a sniper in the gun-battle:

This lasted between twenty and thirty minutes, so it was quite a long fight, until it culminated with the withdrawal of the enemy. In particular, I would say that we beat them. As we had coordinated the artillery fire, Major Aldo Rico ordered our guns to fire and our shots began to fall on the retreating enemy. We ordered them to open their range as the British retreated, that is, we would chase them with cannon fire. I appreciate that many British must have died that night because the fire from our artillery was tremendous.

The next day, a 4th Regiment patrol under Subteniente Marcelo Llambías-Pravaz collected the British equipment abandoned in the action, and these were presented as war trophies to Argentine war correspondents in Port Stanley who filmed and photographed the equipment.

On the night of 12–13 June, Captain Andres Ferrero's 3rd Assault Section of 602 Commando Company took up ambush positions in the vicinity of Mount William, in support of the 5th Marine Infantry Battalion.

According to First Lieutenant Horacio Fernando Lauría, a judo-black-belt from Captain Ferrero's patrol:

In one of those strange missions, they sent us with First Lieutenant Horacio Guglielmone to position ourselves one night, five hundred metres in front of the 5th Marine Infantry Battalion, the closest to the British, to provide security and obtain information. Back to back, alone, we were very alert with great fear of the Gurkhas, without even blinking. It had been a strong psychological action of the enemy, and we all had a great obsession through fear of being slaughtered: the tension was constant. To counteract that campaign, I wanted to kill one with my bare hands, which I feel capable of doing, and cut off a limb in order to show it to the conscript soldiers and diminish their panic.

The war ended on 14 June.

=== 21st century ===
The company is based in Córdoba Province and is under the command of the Rapid Deployment Force as part of the Special Operations Forces Group.

== See also ==
- Rapid Deployment Force (Argentina)
- Special Operations Forces Group
- 601 Air Assault Regiment
- 601 Commando Company
- Argentine Army
