= Oscar Poltronieri =

Argentinian soldier during the Falklands War

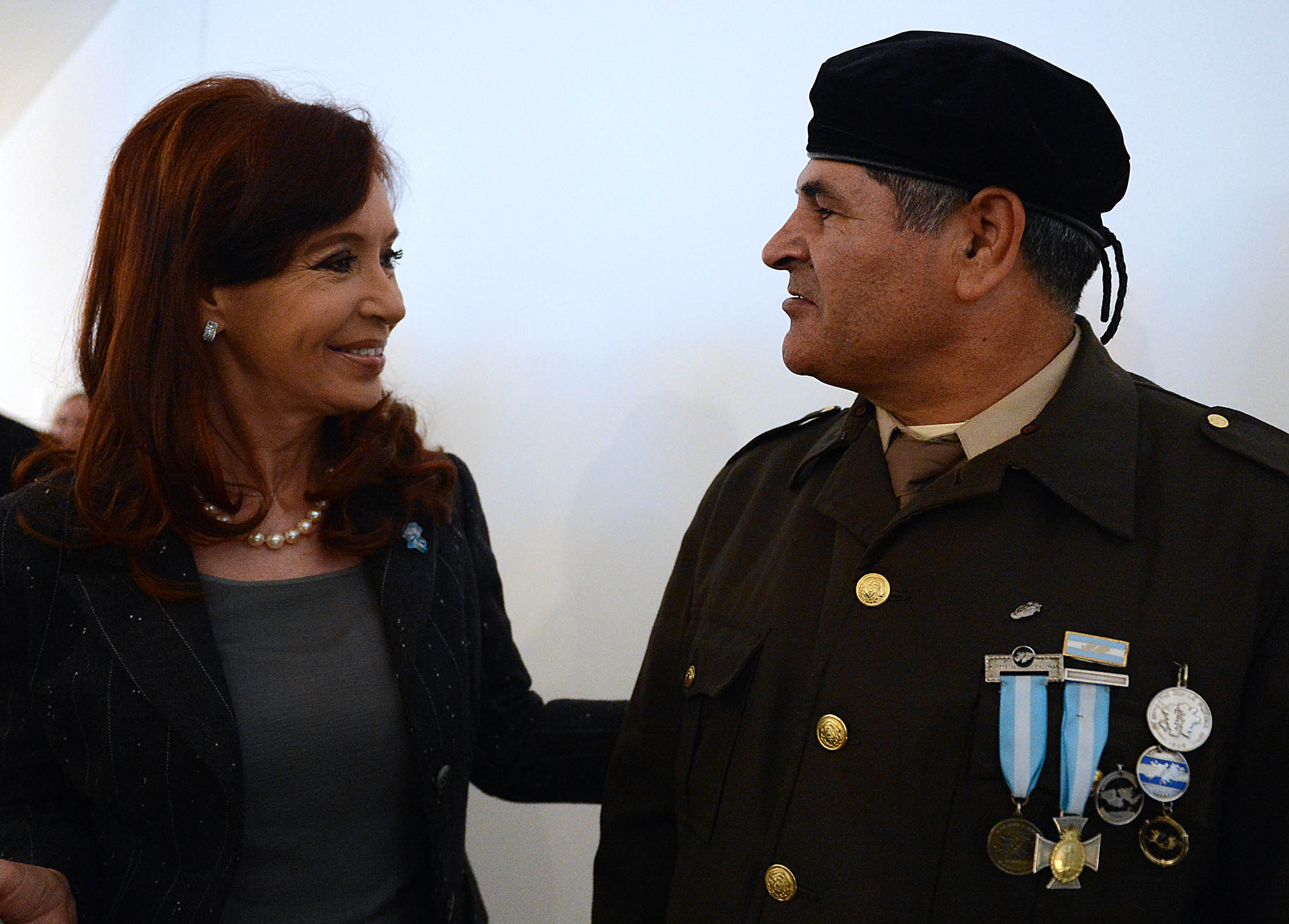
Cristina Kirchner and Oscar Poltronieri

Oscar Ismael Poltronieri (born 2 February 1962) is an Argentine former soldier, who fought in the Falklands War in 1982. He is the only private who received antemortem the highest military distinction of Argentina, the Cross for Heroic Valour in Combat, for his actions during the Battle of Two Sisters.

He was born in Mercedes, Buenos Aires Province, into a poor family and started work as ranch hand when he was a child, never finishing elementary school. In 1981, Poltronieri was called up for military service. With only basic instruction, he was assigned to the Sixth Infantry Regiment to fight during the conflict of the Falklands in 1982. In the last hours of the combat, ignoring an order to withdraw, he stayed with an FN MAG, single-handedly stopping an assault by the Scots Guards.

After the war, he only got temporary jobs and became a beggar due to the desmalvinización, the rejection by Argentinian society of the Falklands conflict and its veterans. Nevertheless, he became the subject of recognition when his story attracted the attention of the main media of the country such as the newspaper Clarín. The Argentine Army eventually incorporated him as civilian personnel at Campo de Mayo base.

He is the subject of multiple tributes including a documentary about his life and songs.
