= Medal of Valour in Combat =

Argentine award

Argentine Nation to the Valour in Combat
- Argentine Nation to the Valour in Combat Ribbon Argentine Nation to the Valour in Combat Ribbon
- Type: Medal
- Awarded for: "acts of valor in combat in hazardous circumstances"
- Presented by: Argentina
- Eligibility: Members of the Argentine Armed Forces
- Status: Currently awarded
- Final award: 1982

Precedence
- Next (higher): Argentine Nation to the Heroic Valour in Combat Cross

Argentine Nation for Valour in Combat Medal (Spanish: Medalla "La Nación Argentina al Valor en Combate") is the second highest military decoration given by the President of Argentina.

The decoration consists of a bronze circular medal bearing the Coat of arms of Argentina surrounded by the legends "La Nación Argentina" (top) and "al Valor en Combate" (bottom), suspended from a chest ribbon of equal light blue-white-light blue stripes.

Recipients of the Medal for service during the 1982 Falklands War (Spanish: Guerra de las Malvinas/Guerra del Atlántico Sur) are listed below.

== Posthumous ==
=== Argentine Army ===
13 decorated members

- First Lieutenant Ruben Eduardo Marquez 602 Commando Company
- First Lieutenant Roberto Mario Fiorito 601 Assault Helicopter Battalion
- First Lieutenant Juan Carlos Buschiazo 601 Assault Helicopter Battalion
- Sub-Lieutenant Juan Domingo Baldini 7th Infantry Regiment
- Sub-Lieutenant Oscar Augusto Silva 4th Infantry Regiment
- First Sergeant Oscar Humberto Blas 602 Commando Company
- Sergeant Sergio Ismael García 25th Infantry Regiment (Argentina)
- Sergeant Raúl Dimotta 601 Combat Aviation Battalion
- First Corporal Dario Rolando Ríos 7th Infantry Regiment
- Corporal Mario Rodolfo Castro 25th Infantry Regiment (Argentina)
- Private 63 Class Fabricio Edgar Carrascull 25th Infantry Regiment (Argentina)
- Private 63 Class Roque Evaristo Sanchez 12th Regiment
- Private 63 Class Avelino Nestor Oscar Pegoraro 12th Regiment

=== Argentine Air Force ===
- Comodore Gustavo Enrique Aguirre Faget
- Vice Comodore Jorge Nelson Barrionuevo
- Major Jose Ernesto Basilio
- Captain Jose Leonidas Ardiles
- Captain Jorge Humberto Bacchiddu
- First Lieutenant Juan Jose Arraras (A4 Skyhawk Pilot)
- Suboficial Mayor Guillermo Mario Aguirre
- Suboficial Mayor Jose Antonio Alvarez
- Suboficial Mayor Mario Nestor Amengual
- Suboficial Principal Manuel Alberto Albelos
- Suboficial Principal Oscar Antonio Ardizzoni
- Suboficial Principal Pedro Cesar Bazan
- Suboficial Auxiliar Roberto Osvaldo Alonso
- Cabo Hector Walter Aguirre

== During Lifetime ==
=== Argentine Army ===
40 decorated members

- Lieutenant Colonel CARLOS ALBERTO QUEVEDO GA Aerot 4
- Major OSCAR RAMON JAIMET Rl Mec 6

Jaimet (the Operations Officer in RI Mec 6) is frequently highlighted as an "excellent officer and a gentleman" by a number of Argentine and British writers. His unit, B Company, is often claimed in recent works to be one of the best and well-officered Argentine formations in the ground war. Jaimet is well recognized for making sure his conscripts were well fed after authorizing his men to shoot and butcher sheep and fry their meat over an open field-kitchen camp fire among rocks behind British view.

- Major MARIO LUIS CASTAGNETO 601 Commando Company
- Major GUILLERMO RUBEN BERAZAY Rl Mec 3

Berazay (the Operations Officer in RI Mec 3) is reported to have demonstrated a great fighting spirit throughout the campaign. He was instrumental in organizing the counterattack on the part of 3rd Infantry Regiment's A Company on Wireless Ridge. In preparation for house-to-house combat in Port Stanley, he again took over the remnants of A/RI Mec 3 now forming a new defensive line at Stanley Racecourse and rallied retreating soldiers from other units.

- Captain RODRIGO ALEJANDRO SOLOAGA Esc ExpI C Bl 10
- Captain JORGE RODOLFO SVENDSEN 601 Assault Helicopter Battalion
- First Lieutenant JORGE AGUSTIN ECHEVERRIA
- First Lieutenant CARLOS DANIEL ESTEBAN 25th Infantry Regiment
- First Lieutenant HORACIO FERNANDO LAURIA
- First Lieutenant JULIO CESAR NAVONE GA 3
- First Lieutenant CARLOS ALBERTO CHANAMPA GA Aerot 4
- First Lieutenant HUGO ALBERTO PEREZ COMETO 601 Combat Aviation Battalion
- First Lieutenant ALEJANDO ESTEBAN VILLAGRA
- First Lieutenant EDUARDO ERNESTO LOPEZ LEGUIZAMON
- Lieutenant RAMON GALINDEZ MATIENZO Rl Mec 7
- Lieutenant RAUL CASTAÑEDA Rl Mec 7
- Sub-Lieutenant OSCAR ROBERTO REYES RI 25
- Sub-Lieutenant ERNESTO PELUFFO RI 12

Peluffo is recognized for fighting well at Goose Green. His platoon was noted by British Captain Roderick Bell for pinning down A Company for several hours. He was gravely wounded in the action. Peluffo is also remembered by his former conscripts for taking care of them. He was reported to have shared his weekly bread loaf allocation with them and taken his platoon out of line before the main battle in order to allow his men to shower and get some proper rest in a commandeered civilian house.

- Sub-Lieutenant MARCELO ALBERTO LLAMBIAS PRAVAZ RI 4
- First Sergeant JUAN CARLOS COHELO RI 12
- First Sergeant JOSE RIVAS
- First Sergeant ROLANDO SPIZUOCCO RI Mec 7
- Sergeant JOSE MARIA GONZALEZ FERNANDEZ
- Sergeant MIGUEL ALFREDO MORENO
- First Corporal MANUEL ADAN MEDINA Rl Mec 7
- First Corporal LUIS DORO
- First Corporal VICENTE BACA
- First Corporal EDUARDO ANIBAL RAMON CRAVERO
- First Corporal MARTIN HECTOR SAN MIGUEL
- Corporal HUGO OSMAR GODOY
- Corporal MARIO MARVIL PACHECO
- Corporal GENARO BORDON
- Private 62 class LUCIANO OSCAR PINTOS RI Mec 12
- Private 62 class OSCAR WULDRICH
- Private 62 class EDUARDO GONZALEZ RI 4
- Private 62 class PEDRO CELESTINO ARRUA
- Private 62 class HECTOR OMAR REINALDI
- Private 62 class PEDRO RAMON SAUCEDO
- Private 62 class RODOLFO SULIN
- Private LEONARDO RONDI RI Mec 6

=== Argentine Navy ===
6 decorated members

- Capitán de Fragata CARLOS HUGO ROBACIO 5th Marine Infantry Battalion
- Capitán de Corbeta ALOIS ESTEBAN PAYAROLA
- Teniente de Fragata DIEGO GARCIA QUIROGA (Agrupación de Buzos Tácticos)
- Cabo Principal FRANCISCO SOLANO PAEZ
- Cabo Segundo ERNESTO URBINA Agrupación de Buzos Tácticos
- Soldado Conscripto ROMUALDO BAZAN

== See also ==
- Argentine Nation to the Heroic Valour in Combat Cross
- List of military decorations
