= Special Operations Forces Grouping (Argentina) =

- Agrupación de Fuerzas de Operaciones Especiales
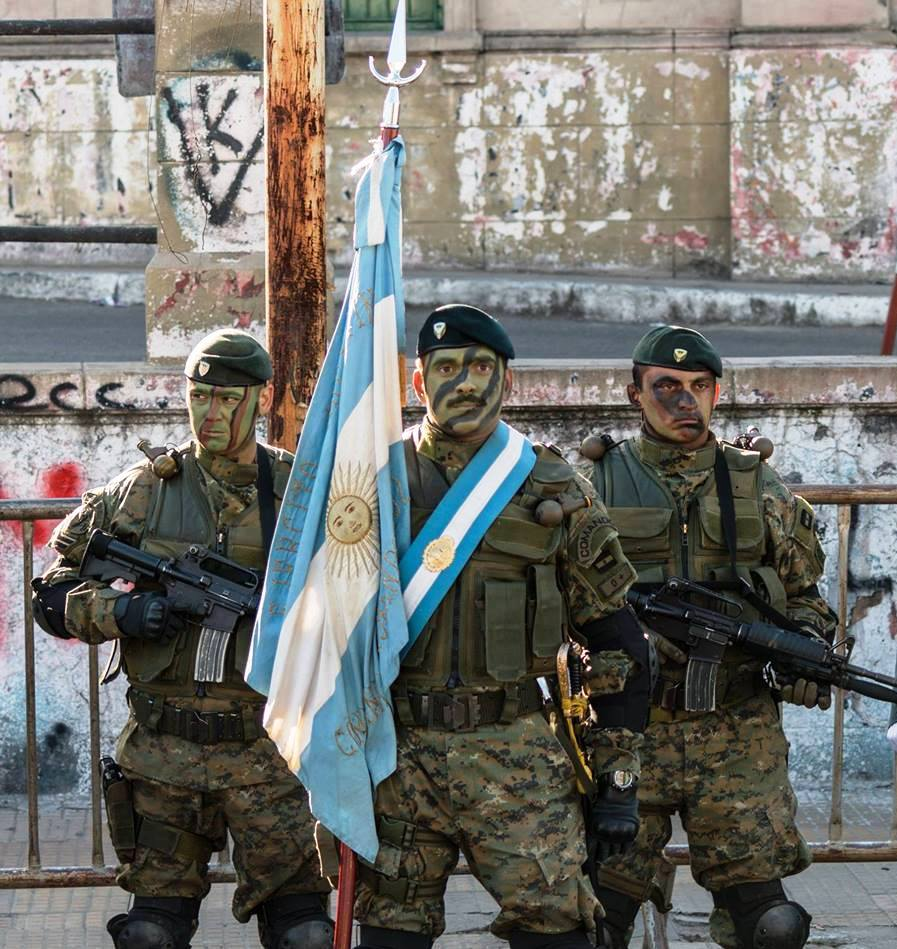
- Active: 2005–present
- Country: Argentina
- Branch: Argentine Army
- Type: Unified combatant command
- Size: Brigade
- Part of: Rapid Deployment Force
- Garrison/HQ: Campo de Mayo, Buenos Aires
- Nickname: AFOE
- Motto: "Sapientia et Labore" (601st)
- Colors: red, green
- Anniversaries: 6 December
- Engagements: Falklands War

Commanders
- Notable commanders: Lt.Col. Mohamed Alí Seineldín (601st Commando)

The Special Operations Forces Grouping (Spanish: Agrupación de Fuerzas de Operaciones Especiales, AFOE) is the unified combatant command charged with overseeing the various special warfare operations component commands of the Argentine Army (EA).

== Role ==
Created 6 December 2005 as the first operational element of the Argentine Army Project 2025.

The service is mainly composite of air assault infantry, airborne forces, commandos, special operations forces, and light helicopters; also artillery, engineers, air transport, and communications companies are constantly ready to assist and support the group. As of 2006 it consists of:

Special Operations Forces Group:

- 601 Commando Company (Spanish: Compañía de Comandos 601) is a one of three commando (special operations capable) units of the Argentine Army, created 5 January 1982. They fought in the Falklands War and Battle of La Tablada
- 602 Commando Company (Spanish: Compañía de Comandos 602) is a one of three commando (special operations capable) units of the Argentine Army, created 21 May 1982. They fought in the Falklands War.
- 603 Commando Company (Spanish: Compañía de Comandos 603) is a one of three commando (special operations capable) units of Argentine Army. The date of formation is unknown, probably recent.
- 601 Air Assault Regiment (Spanish: Regimiento de Asalto Aéreo 601) is a special operations forces unit of the Argentine Army, created in January 2003. The regiment is divided in three assault companies: A, B and C. Its motto is "Sapientia et Labore".

One of the objectives of the modernization process for the Argentine Army was to manage an enabled force that could move quickly to any crisis.

According to the Argentine Army website (translated):

The FDR will be organized, equipped and instructed with organic means of the Army to operate to requirement, in immediate form in any zone of the country, in order to provide to the high conduction of the Force an operational, efficient and fast instrument to act in situations that they require of the immediate use of the force.

The FDR must have a high capacity of preparation and reaction that allows him to be used in the designated place. It will be instructed in the execution of basic tactical operations and complementary, for which it is properly equipped. It could be displaced in organic means of transport of the Force Army. In addition, it will be able to execute commando operations and special operations forces of high complexity.

Two commando companies will depend on her in organic form, along with an aerial shock battalion, a battalion of assault helicopters, and a slight reconnaissance company.

== See also ==
- Argentine Army
- Special Air Service
