= Bruce Quarrie =

English writer

Bruce Quarrie (1947 in London – 4 September 2004) was an English writer and author on wargaming and militaria topics.

== Career ==
Quarrie attended Kingsbridge Grammar School in Devon before going on to study English at Peterhouse, Cambridge, graduating in 1968. He became a journalist with the Financial Times and then in 1972 joined Patrick Stephens Limited, a Cambridge specialist publisher, as editor of Airfix Magazine, which PSL produced. He wrote the first of his many books about wargaming in 1974 and in 1986 he became a full-time writer. He wrote over 40 titles, mainly on the Second World War militaria.

Quarrie was an active wargamer. His 1974 book Napoleonic Wargaming brought the hobby to wide attention. Quarrie owned a large miniature army of wargames figures, including the entire Westphalian army of the Napoleonic era.

== Criticism about his choice of subject ==
In his 1997 book 'Revolutionary Armies in the Modern Era: A Revisionist Approach' (described as "too flawed to be recommended as an undergraduate text"), historian S.P. MacKenzie describing Quarrie's works on the Waffen-SS mentions him as a popular author who suggested that the elite Waffen SS units demonstrated toughness, innovation and courage, which along with focused aggression, changed the course of the war. Mackenzie writes that "as older generation of Waffen-SS scribes has died off, a new, post-war cadre of writers has done much to perpetuate the image of the force as a revolutionary European army" and includes Quarrie in this group.

== Personal life ==
Quarrie was married, with two daughters and 9 grandchildren, and lived in Wellingborough, Northamptonshire.

== Selected works ==
- Panzers in the desert, 1980
- Napoleon's Campaigns in Miniature: War Gamers' Guide to the Napoleonic Wars, 1796-1815, ISBN 0-85059-283-6, 4 Editions
- Tank Battles in Miniature 2: A Wargamer's Guide to the Russian Campaign 1941-45,
- Tank Battles in Miniature 3: Wargamers' Guide to the North-West European campaign 1944-1945, ISBN 0850592569, 1976
- Napoleonic Wargaming (Airfix Magazine Guide No. 4), 1974, ISBN 0850591783
- World War 2 Wargaming (Airfix Magazine Guide No. 15), 1976, ISBN 0850592305
- Panzergrenadier Division 'Grossdeutschland', 1977
- Fallschirmpanzer Division 'Hermann Göring', 1978
- Tank Battles in Miniature 5: Wargamers' Guide to the Arab-Israeli Wars since 1948, 1978
- Second SS Panzer Division 'Das Reich', 1979
- World War II Photo Album 9 Panzers in Russia 1941-43, 1979
- PSL Guide to Wargaming [ed.], Patrick Stephens Ltd, 1980, ISBN 0850594138
- Fantasy Wargaming [contributor], Patrick Stephens Ltd, 1981, ISBN 0850598060
- Panzers in the Balkans and Italy, 1981
- Hitler's Samurai: Waffen-SS in Action, Arco, 1983, ISBN 0850598060
- German Airborne Troops, 1939-45, 1983
- Secret Police Forces of the World, 1986
- Hitler's Teutonic Knights: SS Panzers in action, Patrick Stephens Ltd, 1986
- Beginner's Guide to Wargaming, 1987
- The World's Elite Forces: The Men, Weapons and Operations in the War Against Terrorism, 1985
- Armoured Wargaming, Wildside, 1988
- Hitler: the victory that nearly was, David & Charles, London 1988, ISBN
- Encyclopaedia of the German Army in the 20th Century, Harper Collins, 1989
- Special Forces, 1990
- Weapons of the Waffen-SS: From Small Arms to Tanks, 1990
- Lightning Death: the story of the Waffen-SS, Patrick Stephens Ltd, 1991, ISBN 1852600756
- Waffen-SS Soldier, 1940-45, 1999 Osprey
- The Ardennes Offensive: Central Sector: V Panzer Armee, 2000. Osprey
- The Ardennes Offensive: Central Sector: VII US Corps and VIII US Corps, 2000. Osprey
- Fallschirmjäger: German Paratrooper 1935-45, 2001. Osprey
