= 601 Assault Helicopter Battalion =

Argentine military unit

Batallón de Helicópteros de Asalto 601 601 Assault Helicopter Battalion
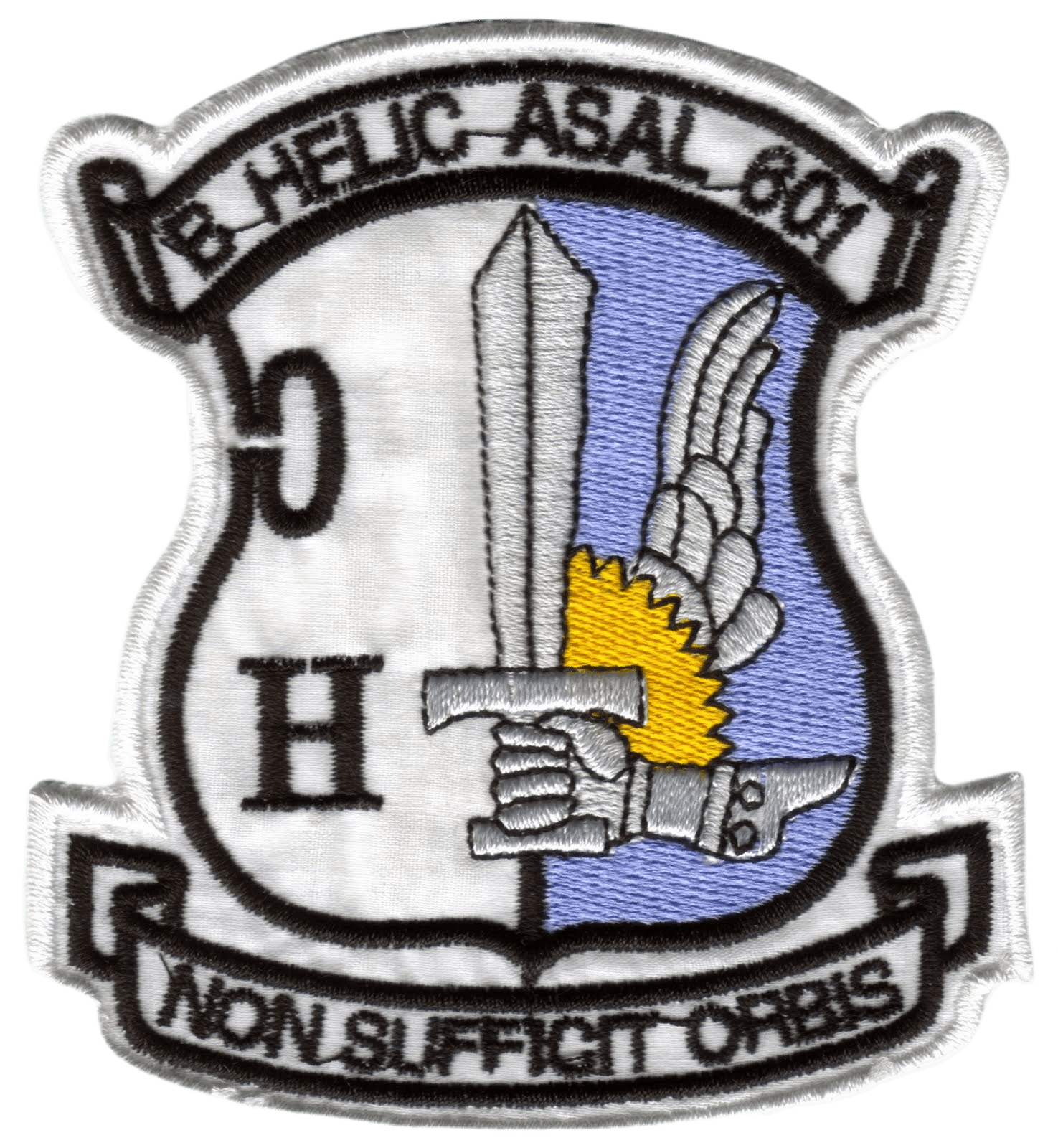
- Active: 1970 - present
- Country: Argentina
- Branch: Argentine Army
- Type: Army aviation
- Part of: Army Aviation Command; Army; Ministry of Defense
- Motto: Non Sufficit Orbis
- Engagements: Operativo Independencia; Falklands War

Commanders
- Commander-in-Chief: President
- Chief of Staff of the Army: General
- Chief of Army Aviation: Colonel
- Battalion Chief: Lieutenant Colonel

Insignia
- Roundel

The 601 Assault Helicopter Battalion (Spanish: Batallón de Helicópteros de Asalto 601) is a helicopter unit of the Argentine Army.

== Description ==
This battalion is the main helicopter unit of the Argentine Army Aviation and is based at Campo de Mayo, Buenos Aires. The unit is composed by Bell UH-1H and Aerospatiale Puma helicopters. It is organised in two assault companies.

The battalion works closely with the infantry unit 601 Air Assault Regiment (Spanish: Regimiento de Asalto Aéreo 601), also based at Campo de Mayo.

== History ==
The unit took part in the Falklands War in 1982 with its original name "601 Combat Aviation Battalion" (Batallón de Aviación de Combate 601).

== Inventory ==
Aircraft	Origin	Type	Variant	In service	Notes
Bell UH-1 Iroquois	USA	Helicopter	205A-1 UH-1H	2 16	
Eurocopter AS332 Super Puma	France	Helicopter	AS332B	3	
Bell 212	USA	Helicopter		1	

== See also ==
- Rapid Deployment Force
- 601 Air Assault Regiment
