= Cross for Heroic Valour in Combat =

Argentine Nation for Heroic Valour in Combat
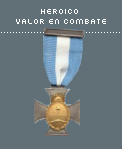
- Type: Cross
- Awarded for: "acts of heroic valor in action in hazardous circumstances"
- Presented by: Argentina
- Eligibility: Members of the Argentine Armed Forces
- Status: Currently awarded
- Final award: 1982

Highlights
- Total: 18
- Ribbon

Precedence
- Next (lower): Argentine Nation to the Valour in Combat Medal

Argentine Nation for Heroic Valour in Combat Cross (Spanish: Cruz "La Nación Argentina Al Heroico Valor En Combate") is the highest national military decoration in Argentina.

The decoration consists of a silver cross pattée bearing the Coat of arms of Argentina in gold, suspended from a chest ribbon of equal light blue-white-light blue stripes.

Recipients of the decoration for service during the 1982 Falklands War (Spanish: Guerra de las Malvinas) are listed below.

== Posthumous ==
=== Argentine Army ===
- Lieutenant Roberto Estévez - 25th Infantry Regiment (Argentina)
- Lieutenant Ernesto Emilio Espinosa - 602 Commando Company
- Sergeant First Class Mateo Antonio Sbert- 602 Commando Company

=== Argentine Navy ===
- Commander Pedro Edgardo Giachino - Amphibious Commandos Group
- Petty Officer First Class Julio Saturnino Castillo. The ship ARA Suboficial Castillo (A-6) was named after him.

=== Argentine Air Force ===
- Captain Omar Jesús Castillo - Pilot Grupo 4
- Captain José Daniel Luis Vazquez - Pilot Grupo 4

== During lifetime ==
=== Argentine Army ===
- 1st Lieutenant Jorge Manuel Vizoso - 602 Commando Company
- 2nd Lieutenant Juan José Gomez Centurión - C/25th Infantry Regiment (Argentina)
- Corporal First Class Roberto Bacilio Baruzzo - RI 12
- S/C 62 Oscar Ismael Poltronieri - RI Mec 6

=== Argentine Navy ===
- Lieutenant Owen Guillermo Crippa - Aermacchi MB-339 Pilot Argentine Naval Aviation
- Lieutenant (JG) Héctor Miño

=== Argentine Air Force ===
- Captain Pablo Marcos Rafael Carballo - A-4 Skyhawk Pilot Grupo 5
- Lieutenant Ernesto Rubén Ureta - A-4 Skyhawk Pilot Grupo 4
- 2nd Lieutenant Gerardo Guillermo Isaac - A-4 Skyhawk Pilot Grupo 4
- Sergeant Pedro Prudencio Miranda
- Sergeant Carlos Omar Ortiz

== See also ==
- Argentine Nation to the Valour in Combat Medal
- List of military decorations
