= List of mountains and hills of the Falkland Islands =

This is a list of the mountains of the Falkland Islands

- Mount Challenger
- Mount Longdon
- Mount Harriett
- Mount Kent
- Mount Low
- Mount Simon
- Mount Tumbledown
- Smoko Mount
- Mount Usborne
- Jack's Mountain
- Mount Wickham
- Pleasant Peak
- Mount Sulivan
- Mount Young
- Mount Edgeworth
- Mount Emery
- Mount Sulivan
- Storm Mountain
- Byron Heights
- Mount Adam
- Mount Maria
- Mount Robinson
- Circum Peak
- Chatham Hill
- Pitt Heights
- Mount Weddell

== See also ==
- List of hills of East Falkland Island
