= John Clements Wickham =

Explorer of Australia (1798–1864)

Captain John Clements Wickham
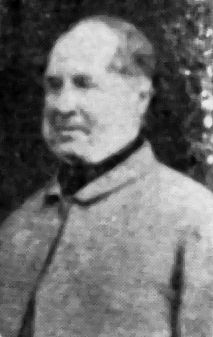
- Portrait of John Clements Wickham

Police Magistrate, District of Moreton Bay, New South Wales
- In office 1 January 1843 – 8 April 1853
- Appointed by: George Gipps
- Preceded by: Gilbert Elliot
- Succeeded by: None; position renamed Police Magistrate, Brisbane

Government Resident, District of Moreton Bay, New South Wales
- In office 8 April 1853 – 1858
- Appointed by: Charles Augustus FitzRoy
- Preceded by: None
- Succeeded by: Frederick Rawkins

Personal details
- Born: 21 November 1798 Leith, Scotland
- Died: 6 January 1864 (aged 65) Biarritz, France
- Resting place: churchyard of Saint-Jean-de-Luz

Military service
- Branch/service: Royal Navy
- Years of service: 1812 – 1841
- Rank: Captain
- Commands: HMS Beagle

John Clements Wickham (21 November 1798 – 6 January 1864) was a Scottish explorer, naval officer, magistrate and administrator. He was first lieutenant on HMS Beagle during its second survey mission, 1831–1836, under captain Robert FitzRoy. The young naturalist and geologist Charles Darwin was a supernumerary on the ship, and his journal was published as The Voyage of the Beagle. After that expedition, Wickham was promoted to Commander and made captain of the Beagle on its third voyage, from 1837 and conducted various maritime expeditions and hydrographic surveys along the Australian coastline.

In 1843, after his retirement from the Royal Navy, Wickham was made Police Magistrate and, later, Government Resident of the Moreton Bay District, in the Colony of New South Wales (NSW). Wickham retired in 1859, when the Moreton Bay District was separated from NSW, forming basis of the Colony of Queensland. When the Queensland and NSW governments disagreed over which was responsible for his pension, Wickham moved to France, where he died.

== The Wickham family ==
The origins of the Wickham family were in Rowley, an East Yorkshire village which later became depopulated. In 1638, two brothers, Richard and Thomas Wickham, were among the families to emigrate to America with Rev. Ezekiel Rogers after he was suspended as Rector of the parish church in 1638 for his non-conformist beliefs. Thomas married Sarah and their fifth son, Samuel Wickham, was born in 1664; he later settled in Rhode Island and became a Freeman of that Colony and a Deputy. Samuel Wickham married Barbara Holken in 1691 and their fifth son, Benjamin Wickham, was born 17 November 1701 at Rhode Island. Benjamin was chosen by the Rhode Island colonial Assembly in 1756 to be Lieutenant-Colonel of a Regiment raised for the second expedition against Crown Point. In 1757, a deputy for Newport he became Speaker of the House of Deputies. Benjamin married Mary, daughter of Colonel John Gardner in 1743 and Samuel Wickham, their sixth and youngest son, was born at Newport, Rhode Island in 1758. This Samuel rose to the rank of Lieutenant in the Royal Navy; while he was attached to the Portuguese Navy as an instructor he was given the rank of Captain-Lieutenant. He fought on the British side in the American War of Independence after which he left America and settled in Scotland. On 16 June 1795 he married Ellen Susan Naylor at Gibraltar. John Clements Wickham was born to them on 21 November 1798 at Leith in Scotland.

== Naval career ==
On 21 February 1812 John Clements Wickham joined the Royal Navy. By 1815 he was an Admiralty Midshipman and was posted to HMS Nightingale and in 1818 was posted to HMS Hyperion before being paid off. He passed his Lieutenant's examination in 1819.

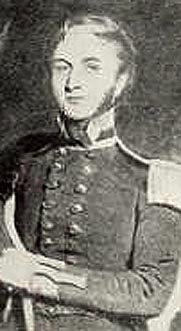
Captain Wickham, c. 1820

In 1825 he was appointed Second-Lieutenant on the British warship Adventure under the command of Phillip Parker King, son of Philip Gidley King, third Governor of New South Wales. The Adventure and the Beagle were ordered to survey the coasts of the southern part of South America, including Patagonia and Tierra del Fuego.

Wickham transferred to the Beagle in 1831 as First Lieutenant, under Captain Robert Fitzroy and first officer Philip Parker King (1791–1856), to complete the survey of Patagonia and Tierra del Fuego, as part of a circumnavigation of the globe. Wickham and King were lifelong friends and brothers-in-law as they married sisters, the daughters of Hannibal Hawkins Macarthur. This would be the most famous voyage of the Beagle, with naturalist Charles Darwin, and artists Augustus Earle and (later) Conrad Martens also on board. After entering the Pacific Ocean, the Beagle surveyed the coasts of Chile and Peru, the Galápagos Islands, the Society Islands, the Navigator (Samoa) and Fiji island groups, New Zealand, Port Jackson (Sydney), Van Diemen's Land (Tasmania), King George's Sound, the Cocos (Keeling) Islands and Mauritius. It then returned, via Saint Helena, Ascension Island, Bahia and Pernambuco to England in 1836.

On 10 January 1837, Wickham was promoted from lieutenant to captain and given command of the Beagle, while Lt John Lort Stokes – a shipmate from the first two journeys of the Beagle – was made first officer.

From 1837 to 1841, the Beagle charting the coasts of north western Australia and Arnhem Land. In 1839, Stokes sighted a natural harbour which Wickham named Port Darwin after their former shipmate.

Some notable events:

- Reached Swan River: 15 November 1837
- Discovered Fitzroy River: 1838
- Left Sydney for Port Essington: 22 May 1839
- Arrived at Port Essington: January 1840
- Discovered and named Adam Bay: 1840
- L. R. (Lewis Roper) Fitzmaurice (mate) discovered Adelaide River mouth at the Clarence Strait: 1840
- Discovered Port Darwin: 1840
- Discovered Victoria River: 1840
- Discovered Fitzmaurice River: 1840
- Wickham and Stokes found evidence of Zeewijk, (a Dutch East Indiaman wrecked 1727) on Gun Island off Geraldton: April 1840

In 1841, Wickham fell ill and resigned his command which was taken over by Stokes, who continued the survey and completed the voyage in 1843. Darwin also took a Galápagos tortoise named Harriet which he gave to Wickham, who brought it to Brisbane. The tortoise gained fame for her longevity, living 175 years until 2006.

== Later life ==
Wickham became the police magistrate at the Moreton Bay District of New South Wales (now Queensland).

From 1853, he was Government Resident of the Moreton Bay District and resided at Newstead House, Brisbane.

In 1859, Wickham moved to the south of France, where he lived until his death in 1864.

== Commemorations ==
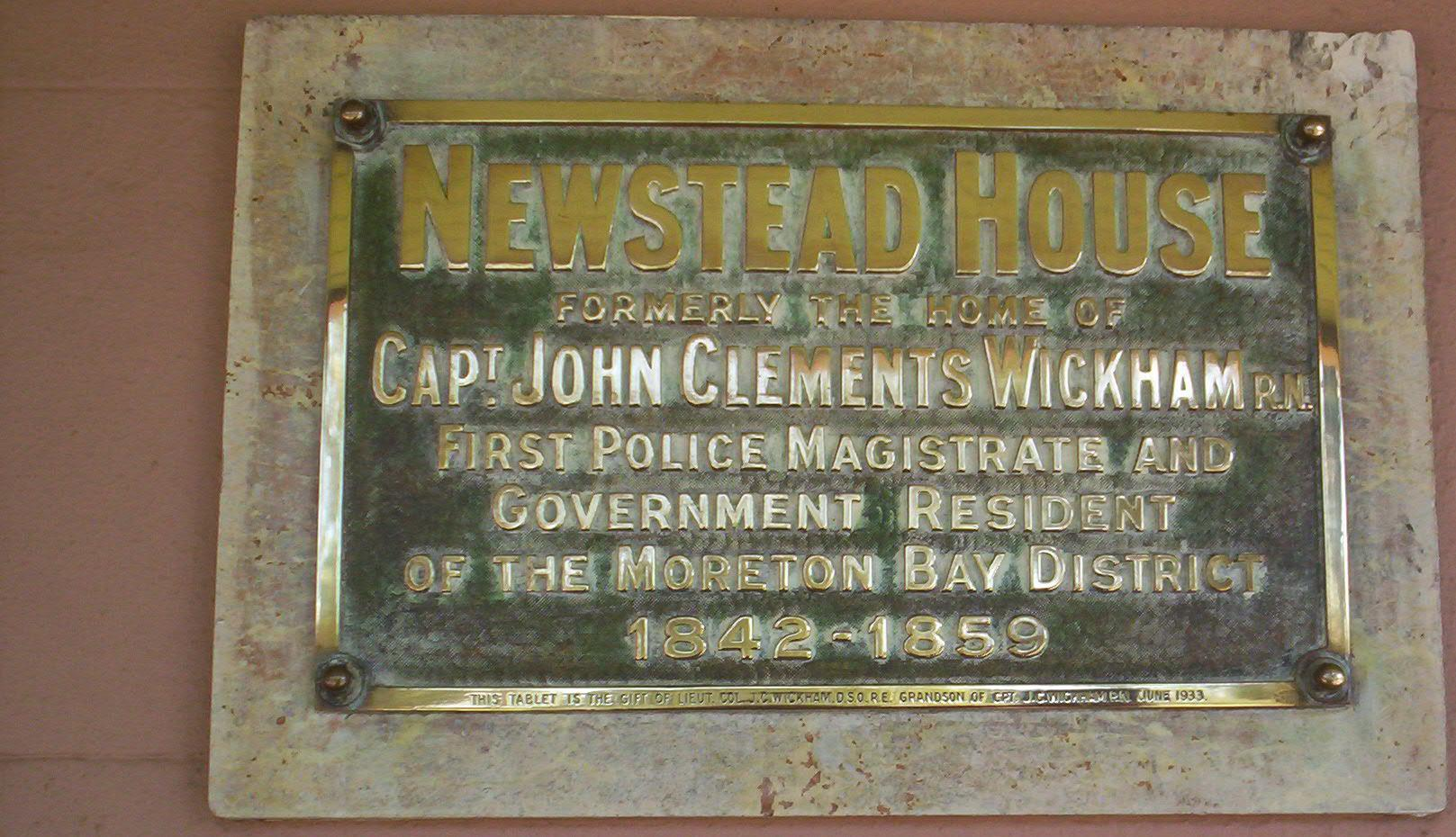
A commemorative plaque at Newstead House

=== Places ===
Australia

- Cape Wickham and Cape Wickham Lighthouse, Tasmania;
- Point Wickham, now known as Caloundra Headland on the Sunshine Coast, Queensland;
- two islands in Western Australia
  - a small island off Bernouilli Island (Timor Sea);
  - a former name of Stanley Island, in the Recherche Archipelago;
- two different hills or peaks named Mount Wickham, in the Northern Territory and Queensland;
- Wickham, New South Wales, a suburb of Newcastle, which includes Wickham Park;
- the town of Wickham, Western Australia;
- the headland of Wickham Point in the Northern Territory
- Wickham Park, Brisbane;
- Wickham River, Northern Territory;
- a major street in Brisbane, Wickham Terrace, where is the notable Wickham Hotel, as well as "Wickham Streets" in Fortitude Valley, Queensland, East Perth, Western Australia, Ayr, and Townsville, and Wyndham Vale, Victoria.

Chile

- Wickham Island

Falkland Islands

- Wickham Heights, including Mount Wickham

Solomon Islands

- Wickham Island, New Georgia Islands group

=== Other commemorations ===
Two defunct electorates in Australian state parliaments, namely

- Electoral district of Wickham (New South Wales)
- Electoral district of Wickham (Queensland)

An Australian plant:

- Grevillea wickhamii (Wickham's Grevillea).

== See also ==
- O'Byrne, William Richard (1849). "Wickham, John Clements" . A Naval Biographical Dictionary . John Murray – via Wikisource.
