= List of rivers of the Falkland Islands =

Map of the Falkland Islands.

Due its geography and geology, the Falkland Islands has no particularly large rivers. Those of some length tend to be sluggish, often ending in one of the frequent fjords or large inlets surrounding the Islands (such as San Carlos Water or Byron Sound) as creeks. However, as the Islands receive high precipitation, there are many small streams to be found on them.

== East Falkland ==
- Malo River/Arroyo Malo
- Moody Brook
- Mullet Creek
- Murrell River
- San Carlos River

== West Falkland ==
- Blackburn River
- Chartres River
- Warrah River

== See also ==
- Geology of the Falkland Islands
