= Wickham Heights =

Mountain range on East Falkland

Coordinates: 51.72°S 58.68°W

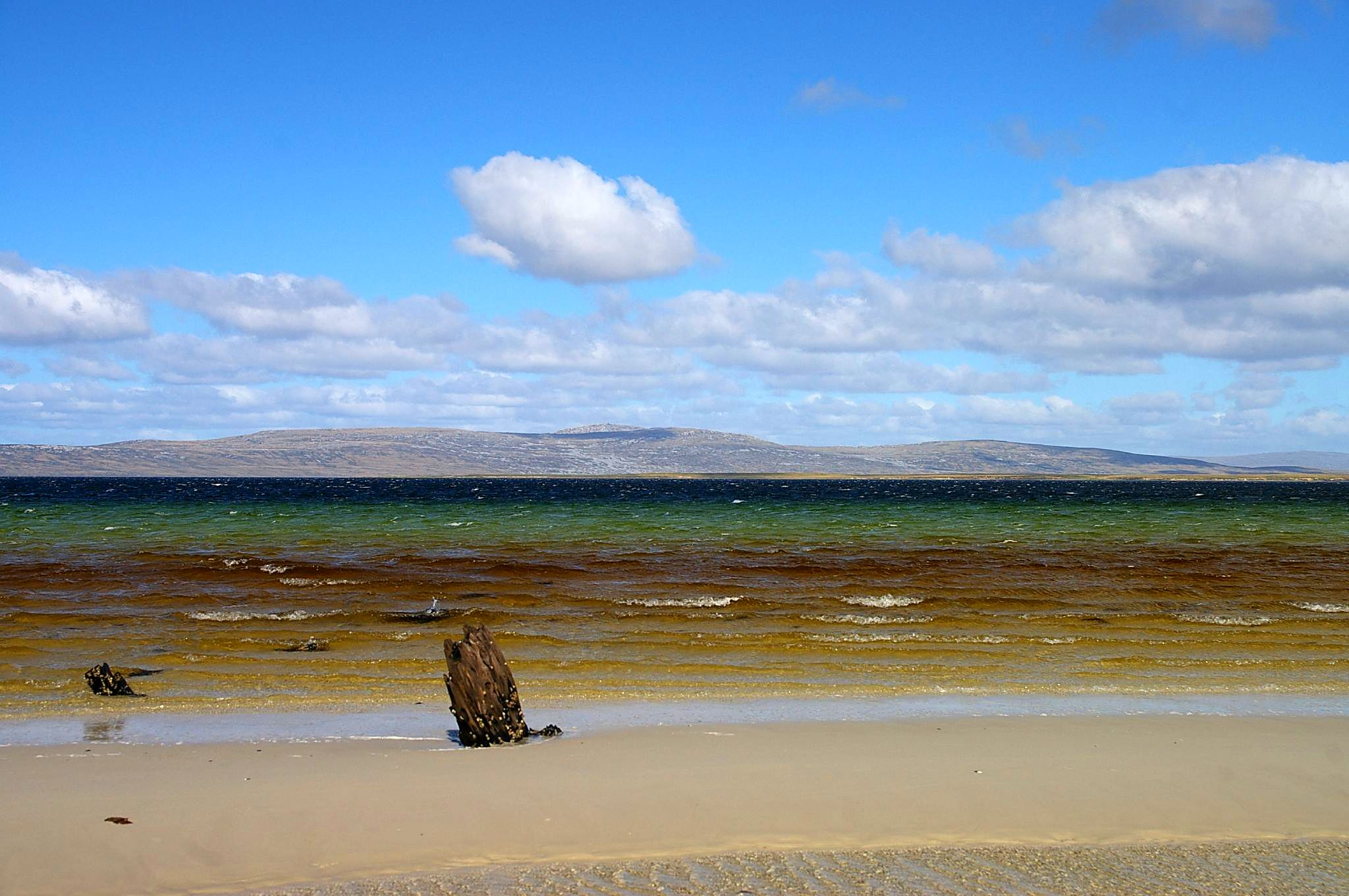
Berkeley Sound with Wickham Heights in the background

The Wickham Heights (Spanish: Las Alturas Rivadavia) are a rugged chain of mountains on East Falkland in the Falkland Islands that extend from Port William (near Stanley) to Port Sussex on the west coast facing Falkland Sound. They include the island group's highest peak, Mount Usborne, Mount Wickham and are partly contiguous with No Man's Land. The slopes of Wickham Heights feature numerous stone runs, and whilst they are not unique to the Falkland Islands, the number of runs in such a small geographical area is notable.

The Wickham Heights are in the northern portion of East Falkland, running east and west, and rising in some places to a height of nearly 2,000 feet (610 m). They form the "spine" of the East Falkland, separating the hilly part in the north from Lafonia in the south, which barely rises above 45 metres (148 ft). The road to Port Louis leaves the Stanley to Darwin Road and goes northward in a narrow gap between Mount Kent in the west, and Two Sisters in the east.

From west to east, the peaks of the range are; Mount Usborne (705 metres (2,313 ft)), Mount Wickham,(627 metres (2,057 ft)), Rocky Mountain (423 metres (1,389 ft)), Smoko Mountain (423 metres (1,389 ft)), Mount Challenger (355 metres (1,164 ft)), Mount Kent (458 metres (1,503 ft)), Two Sisters (194 metres (635 ft)), Mount Harriet (291 metres (954 ft)), Mount Tumbledown (212 metres (695 ft)), Mount William (214 metres (702 ft)), and Sapper Hill. Many of these hills were to see action between the Argentine and British forces during the Falklands war. Rivers and streams such as the Malo River and San Carlos River spring in the Wickham Heights.

Although not considered high in orographic terms, the range of hills provide orographic-related turbulence (large-scale displacement of airflow by hills, mountains and islands), which heads south towards RAF Mount Pleasant, and as such, around 1-in-10 flights into and out of the airport are cancelled, leading to calls to have the major international airport for the islands re-sited.
