= Mount Simon =

Mountain on East Falkland, Falkland Islands

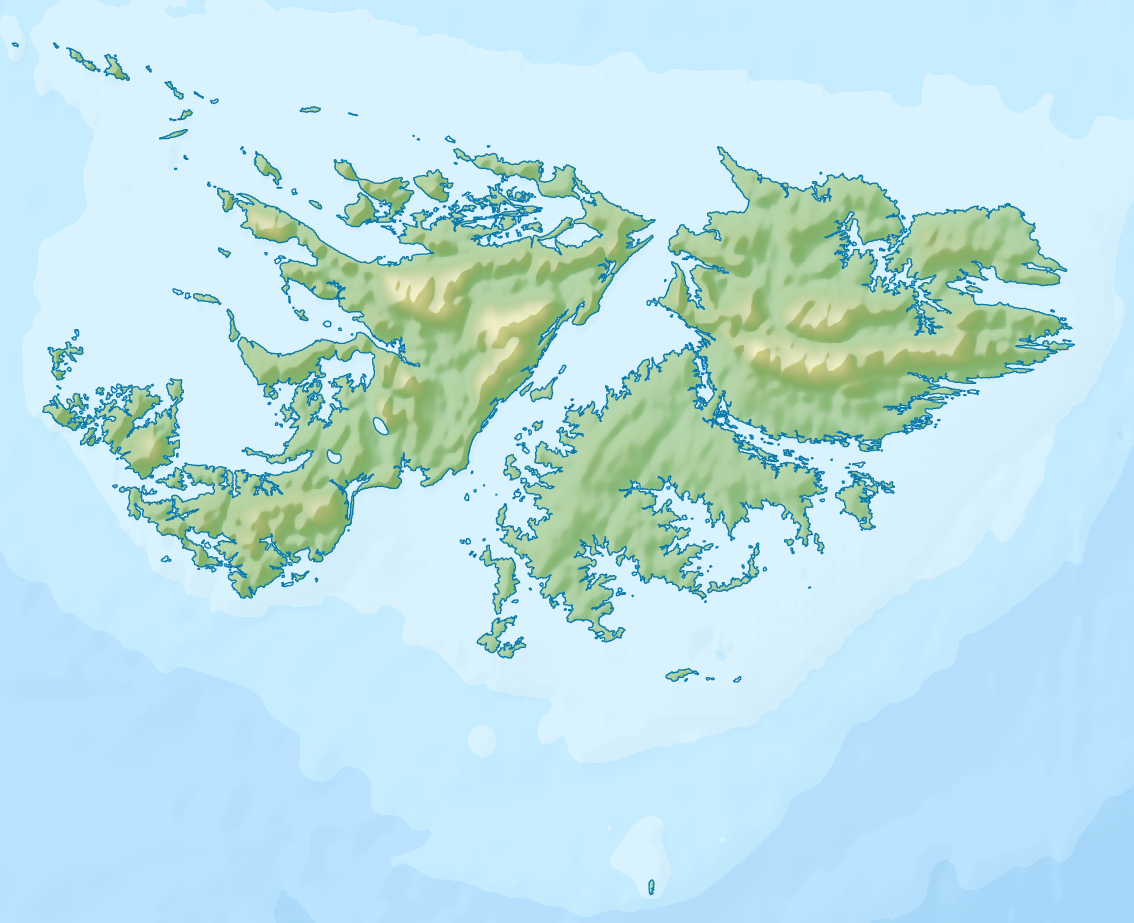
- Location within Falkland Islands

Highest point
- Elevation: 600 m (2,000 ft)
- Coordinates: 51.633°S 58.535°W

Geography
- Location: East Falkland, Falkland Islands, south Atlantic Ocean

Mount Simon is a mountain on East Falkland, Falkland Islands. It is south of Teal Inlet and north of Mount Wickham.
