= Murrell River =

River on East Falkland, the Falkland Islands

Murrell River Rio Murrell (Spanish)
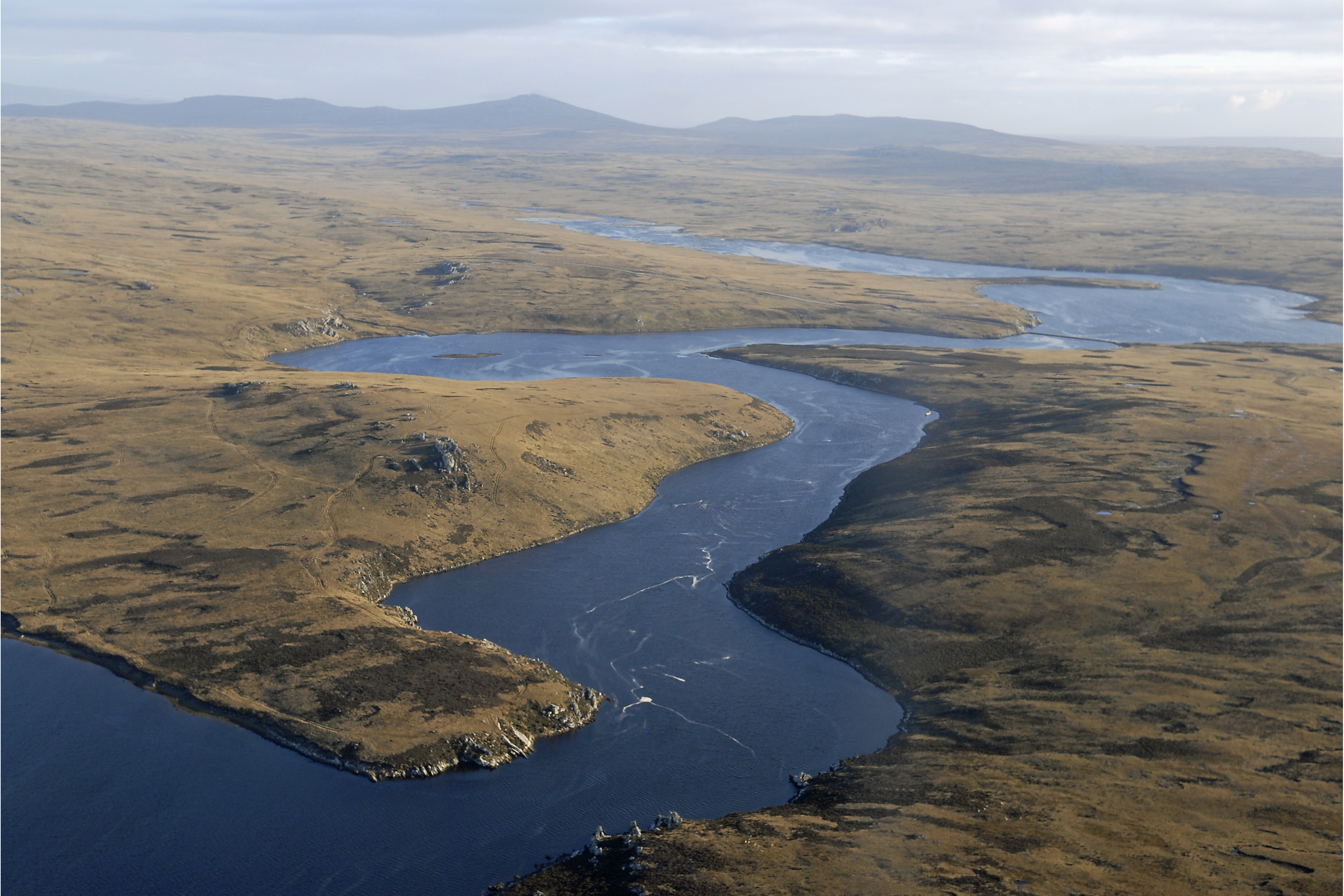
- The Murrell River just before it meets Hearndon Water

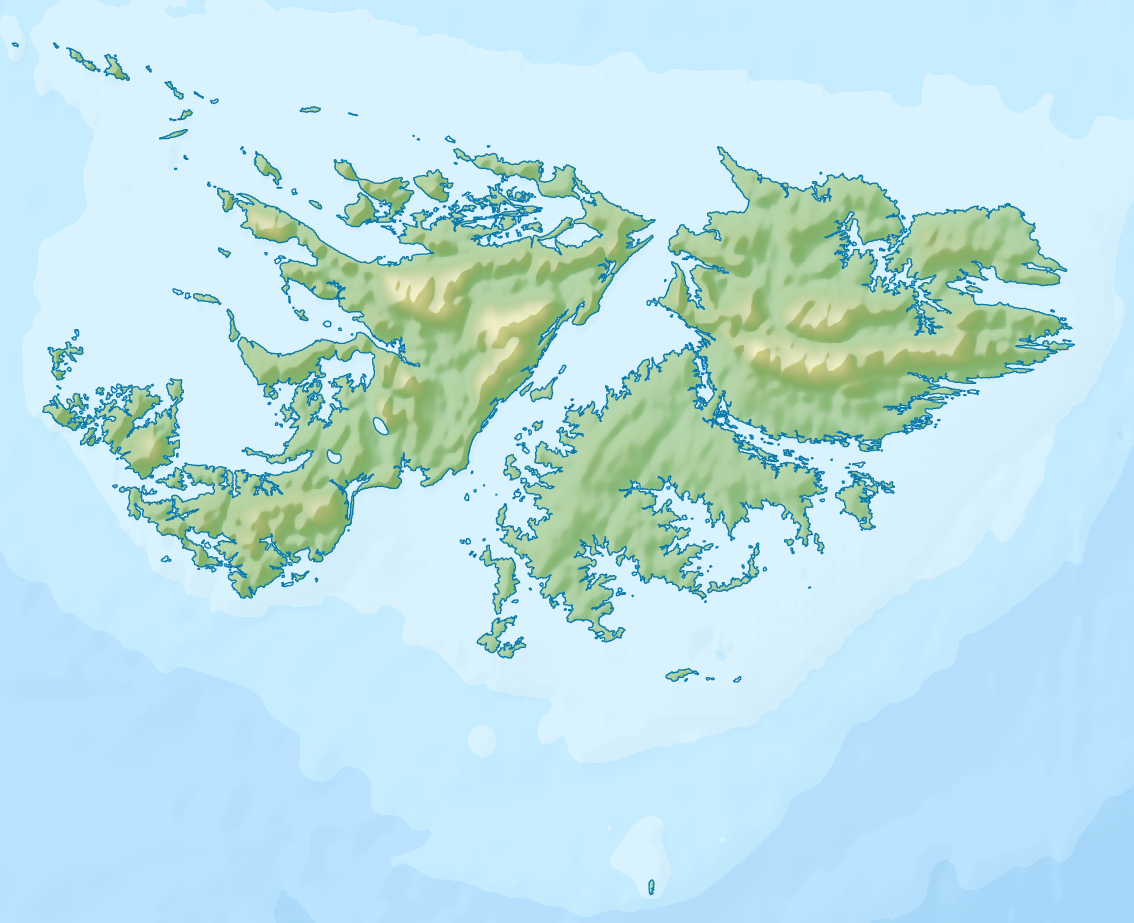
- Location within Falkland Islands

Location
- Country: United Kingdom
- Dependency: Falkland Islands
- Region: East Falkland

Physical characteristics
- Source
  - coordinates: 51.695°S 58.059°W
- Mouth
  - coordinates: 51°40′S 57°53′W
- Length: 13 kilometres (8 mi)

The Murrell River (sometimes Murrel River) is a river on East Falkland in the Falkland Islands. It has a large estuary which joins with Hearnden Water and Port William, and which is not far from Stanley. The river's estuary extends for 5.6 kilometres (3.5 mi) into the bay called Port William which can be fished recreationally, but the non-tidal upstream stretch of the river is not permitted for fishing.

== History ==
The Murrell River rises on Mount Challenger, with tributaries coming off Mount Kent, Harriet and Two Sisters; its tributaries include Shanty Stream. The river drains a catchment area of 143 square kilometres (55 sq mi) of which the land is 15% peatland. The river flows for 13 kilometres (8 mi) and is on average 610 millimetres (24 in) deep, being around 2–3 metres (8–10 ft) wide at the source and some 21 metres (70 ft) where it becomes a tidal estuary. The Murrell River estuary is near to Stanley and is formed by the confluence of the Murrell River and the water from Weir Creek and Hearndon Water, and the estuary extends for 5.6 kilometres (3.5 mi) into the sea at Port William Bay. Fresh water from the Murrell River is used as a freshwater supply for the nearby town of Stanley. The water is pumped from the Murrell River Reservoir (at 51.6862°S 58.0551°W) which had a water monitoring station built on the dam in 2025.

Brown trout have been released into the river and are known to be present in its waters. Although the watercourse is recognised as being quite short, its proximity to Stanley makes it an attractive fishing location for anglers, although the fishing regulations do not permit anglers to fish any further west than Drunken Pass Rocks, the freshwater section of the river, with fishing being permitted only on the tidal estuary section. Water from the Murrell River is used as a freshwater supply for the nearby town of Stanley.

Much of the Battle of Mount Longdon was fought in and around the Murrell River and Murrell Bridge. On 8 June 1982, just prior to this battle four soldiers of the Argentine 7th Infantry Regiment, Alejandro Vargas, Pedro Vojkovic, Manuel Zelarayán and Carlos Hornos, were killed by an Argentine-laid anti-tank mine while returning by boat from an abandoned farmhouse where they had gone to obtain food.

The Murrell River is named after Murrell Robinson, who arrived in the Falklands in January 1842 with Richard Clement Moody. In older spellings of the river name, the last 'L' is omitted, being stylised as Murrel River. The Hispanicized version of the name is Rio Murrell. During the Falklands War, the Murrell Peninsula, 605 hectares (1,490 acres) of land that takes its name from the river and is on the northern side of Murrell River, was mined by Argentine forces.

== See also ==
- List of rivers of the Falkland Islands
