= Mount Low =

Mountain in the Falkland Islands

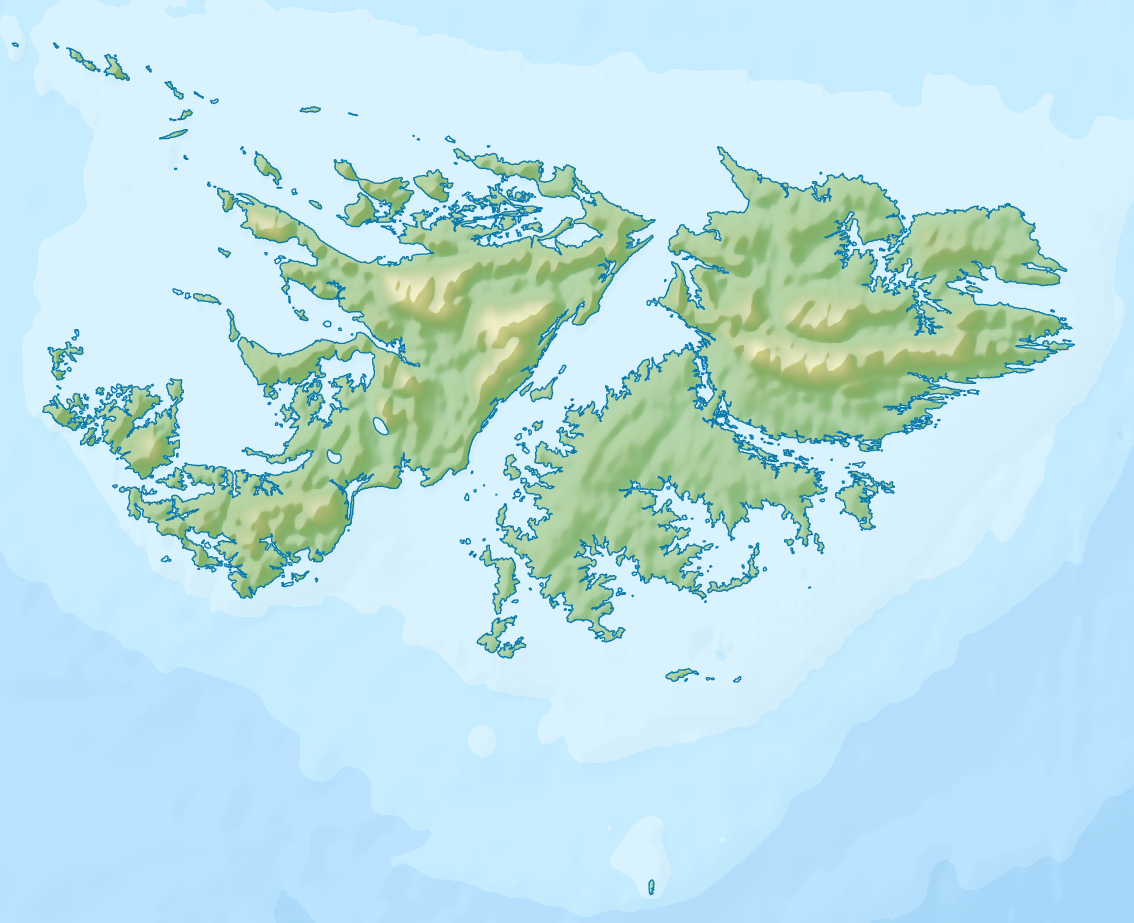
- Location within Falkland Islands

Highest point
- Elevation: 253 m (830 ft)
- Coordinates: 51.627°S 57.834°W

Geography
- Location: East Falkland, Falkland Islands, south Atlantic Ocean

Mount Low (Spanish: Monte Bajo) is a mountain on East Falkland, Falkland Islands. It has an elevation of 253 meters (830 ft). It is due north of Stanley on the north shore of Port William.
