= Teal Inlet =

Settlement on East Falkland in the Falkland Islands

Coordinates: 51°33′26″S 58°26′17″W

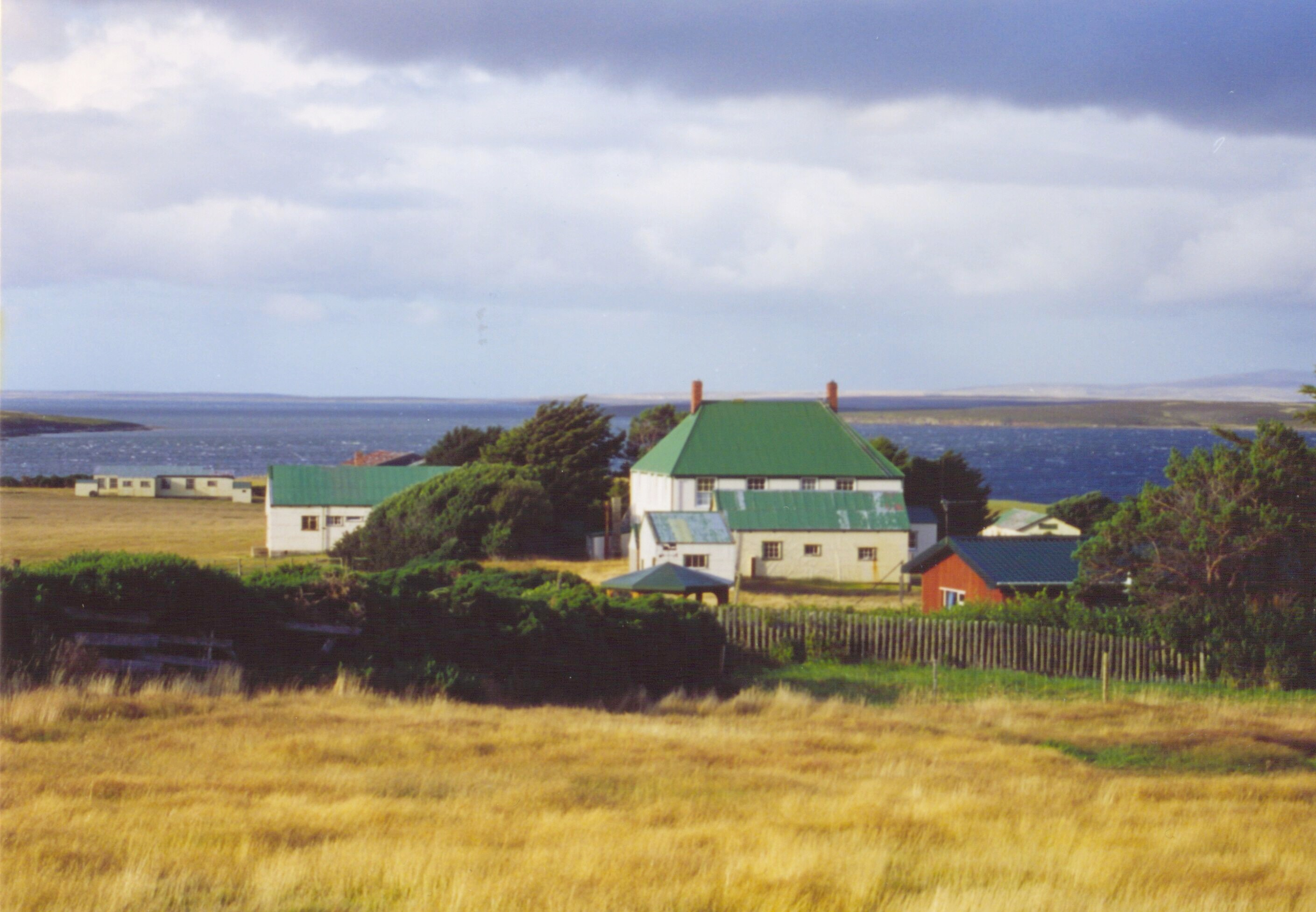
Teal Inlet Settlement

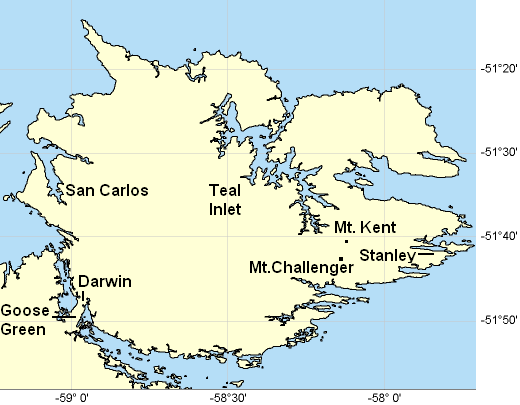
Teal Inlet and northern East Falkland

Teal Inlet (Spanish: Caleta Trullo), once named Evelyn Station, is a settlement on East Falkland, in the Falkland Islands, on the south shore of Salvador Water. It is overshadowed by Jack's Mountain.

== Name ==
It is unsure how the settlement arrived by its name; either the teal-blue waters of the inlet, or the teal ducks which are often found there. Its original name of Evelyn Station was after the daughter of the first farmer on the site, John James Felton.

== Economy ==
Sheep raising for the purposes of selling the wool is the primary occupation in the settlement.

== Geography ==
Teal Inlet is to the north-west of Stanley and takes about an hour to drive there. It has been noted that the settlement at Teal Inlet has a good selection of trees; the islands themselves are mostly unforested.

== Falklands War ==
The settlement played a minor part in the Falklands War, when British troops, who had established a bridgehead at San Carlos Water, divided into two, with one group going to fight at Goose Green and the other travelling along the northern part of East Falkland, by Teal Inlet. The inlet was liberated by British troops on 30 May 1982. Teal Inlet was used as a harbour of refuge by 11th MCM Squadron ships to shelter from air attacks by day during the final assault on Port Stanley, and the Royal Army Medical Corps established a field hospital there in 1982.

In July 2021, a 50 metres (160 ft) by 50 metres (160 ft) area of land at Teal Inlet was excavated in the hope of finding the remains of Argentine soldiers from the Falklands War. There was no suggestion of mistreatment, and the burial of the bodies at the site was said to have been done properly and with a religious ceremony. In August 2021, it was announced that the dig had not revealed any bodies.
