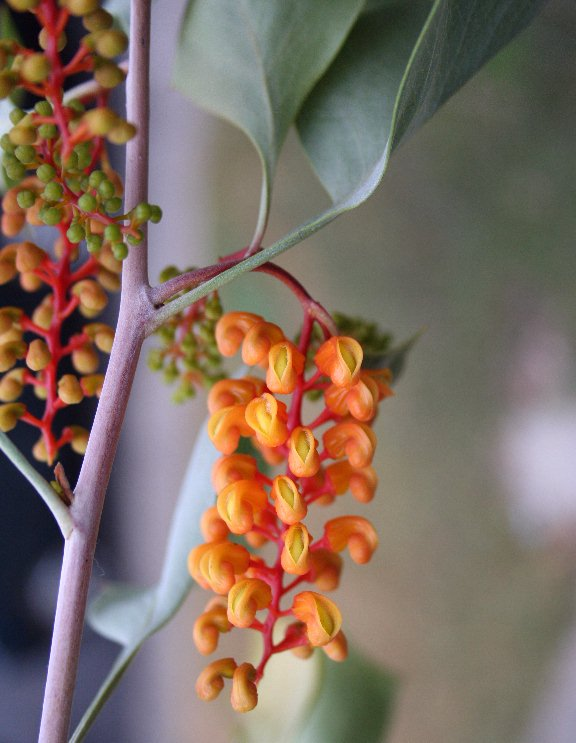
- Subspecies aprica

Scientific classification
- Kingdom: Plantae
- Clade: Tracheophytes
- Clade: Angiosperms
- Clade: Eudicots
- Order: Proteales
- Family: Proteaceae
- Genus: Grevillea
- Species: G. wickhamii

Binomial name
- Grevillea wickhamii Meisn.

= Grevillea wickhamii =

Species of shrub endemic to Australia

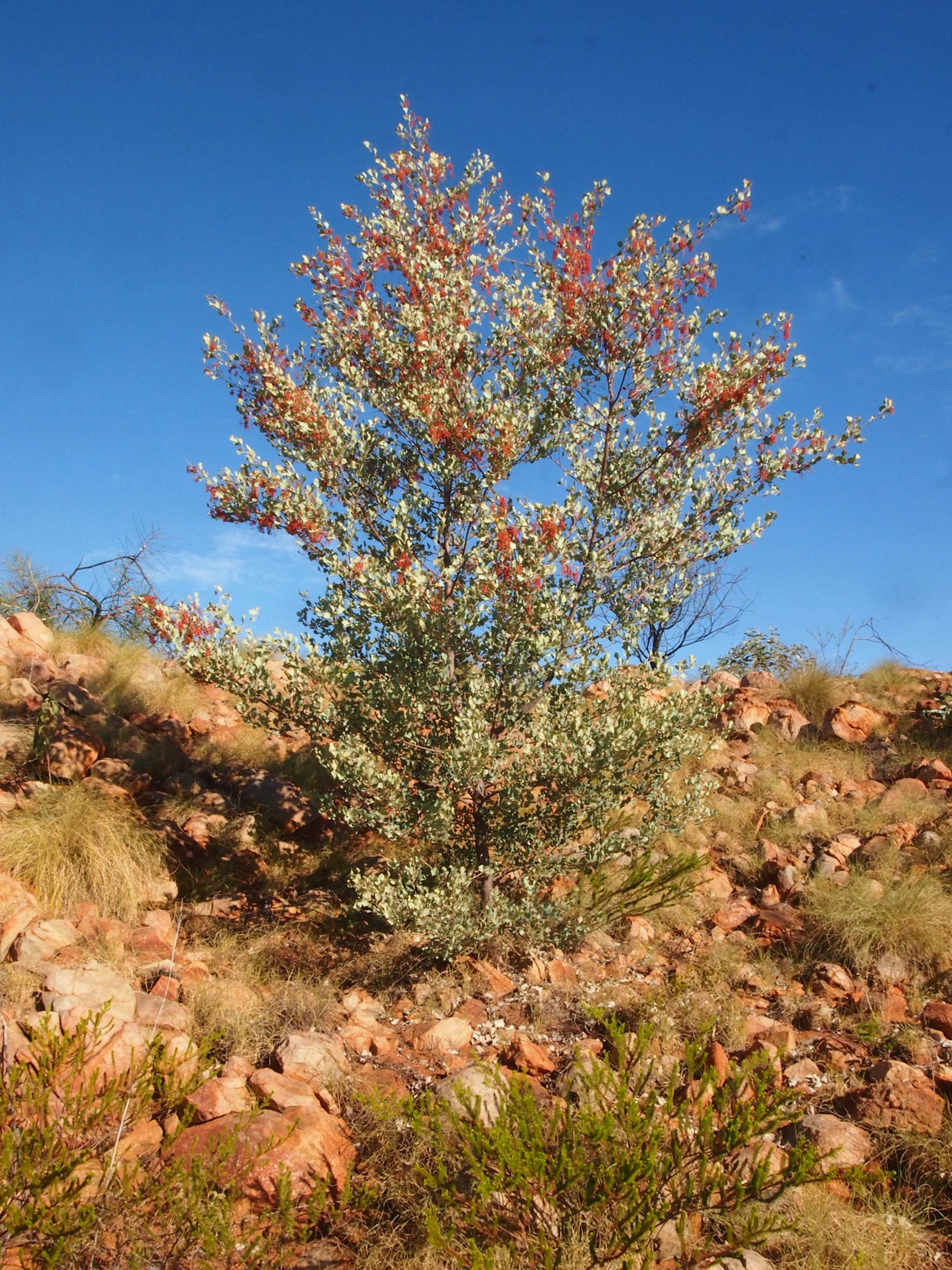
Habit

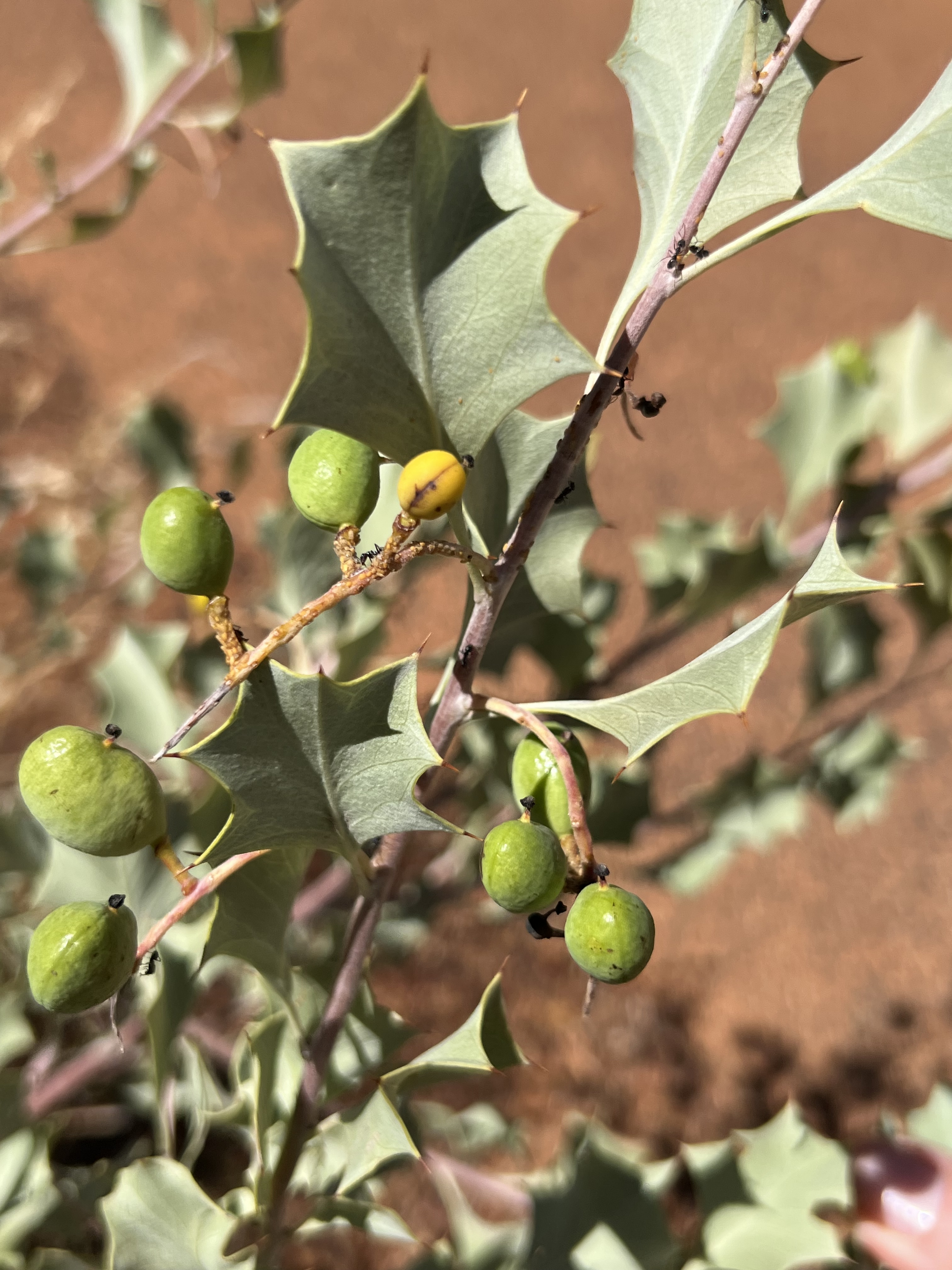
Foliage and fruit, subsp. aprica

Grevillea wickhamii, commonly known as Wickham's grevillea, holly-leaf grevillea or lgarrmari in Djaru, is a species of flowering plant in the family Proteaceae and is endemic to northern Australia. It is an erect shrub or spindly tree with holly-like, broadly egg-shaped leaves with 2 to 7 shallow teeth, and down-curved clusters of flowers, the colour depending on subspecies.

== Description ==
Grevillea wickhamii is an erect shrub or spindly tree, that typically grows to a height of 1–6 m (3 ft 3 in – 19 ft 8 in) and has smooth bark. Its leaves are holly-like, broadly egg-shaped in outline, 30–90 mm (1.2–3.5 in) long and 25–55 mm (0.98–2.17 in) wide, with 2 to 7 shallow, pointed teeth near the tip of the leaves. The flowers are arranged in leaf axils or on the stems in down-curved, sometimes branched clusters, the end groups on a rachis mostly 10–70 mm (0.39–2.76 in) long, each flower on a pedicel usually 2–6 mm (0.079–0.236 in) long. Flower colour and flowering period vary with subspecies, and the pistil is 5–10 mm (0.20–0.39 in) long. The fruit is an oblong, glabrous follicle 10–20 mm (0.39–0.79 in) long.

== Taxonomy ==
Grevillea wickhamii was described in 1856 by Carl Meissner in de Candolle's Prodromus Systematis Naturalis Regni Vegetabilis from specimens collected by John Clements Wickham in northern Australia during the Second voyage of HMS Beagle. The specific epithet (wickhamii) honours the collector of the type specimens.

The names of six subspecies of G. wickhamii are accepted by the Australian Plant Census:

- Grevillea wickhamii subsp. aprica McGill. flowers in most months, with a peak from May to August, and has red or orange flowers.
- Grevillea wickhamii subsp. cratista Makinson flowers in July, and has red to deep pink flowers.
- Grevillea wickhamii subsp. hispidula Makinson flowers from May to August, and has yellow or bright red flowers.
- Grevillea wickhamii subsp. macrodonta Makinson flowers in December and from April to August, and has red to deep orange or yellow flowers, with a yellow style.
- Grevillea wickhamii subsp. pallida Makinson flowers in December and from May to June, and has lemon yellow flowers, with a pale yellow style.
- Grevillea wickhamii Meisn. subsp. wickhamii flowers from April to August, and has red flowers, with a yellow style.

== Distribution and habitat ==
Wickham's grevillea is widespread in northern Western Australia, in inland regions of the Northern Territory and in western Queensland.

- Subspecies aprica grows in open woodland or spinifex communities mainly from south of the Kimberley, in the northern Territory south from Larrimah, and in a few locations in western Queensland.
- Subspecies cratista is only known from the Bungle Bungle Range where it grows in rocky places in grassy woodland.
- Subspecies hispidula grows in open woodland and spinifex communities, often near drainage lines, and is found in the Hamersley Range and Pilbara areas, and east to Kumpupintil Lake and Windy Corner in the Dampierland, Gibson Desert, Great Sandy Desert, Little Sandy Desert and Pilbara bioregions of northern Western Australia.
- Subspecies macrodonta grows in low, open woodland and shrubland on low hills and rocky places in north-western Western Australia, in near-coastal areas between Broome and Goldsworthy, and east to Derby, in the Central Kimberley, Dampierland, Great Sandy Desert and Pilbara bioregions.
- Subspecies pallida is only known from near the tidal limit of the Prince Regent River where it grows in woodland near creeks.
- Subspecies wickhamii grows in open shrubland on sandstone and quartzite outcrops and on the edge of plateaux in the Central Kimberley, Dampierland, Great Sandy Desert, Northern Kimberley bioregions of northern Western Australia.

== Conservation status ==
All 6 subspecies of G. wickhamii are listed as "not threatened" by the Government of Western Australia Department of Biodiversity, Conservation and Attractions.
