= San Carlos River (Falkland Islands) =

River in Falkland Islands, United Kingdom

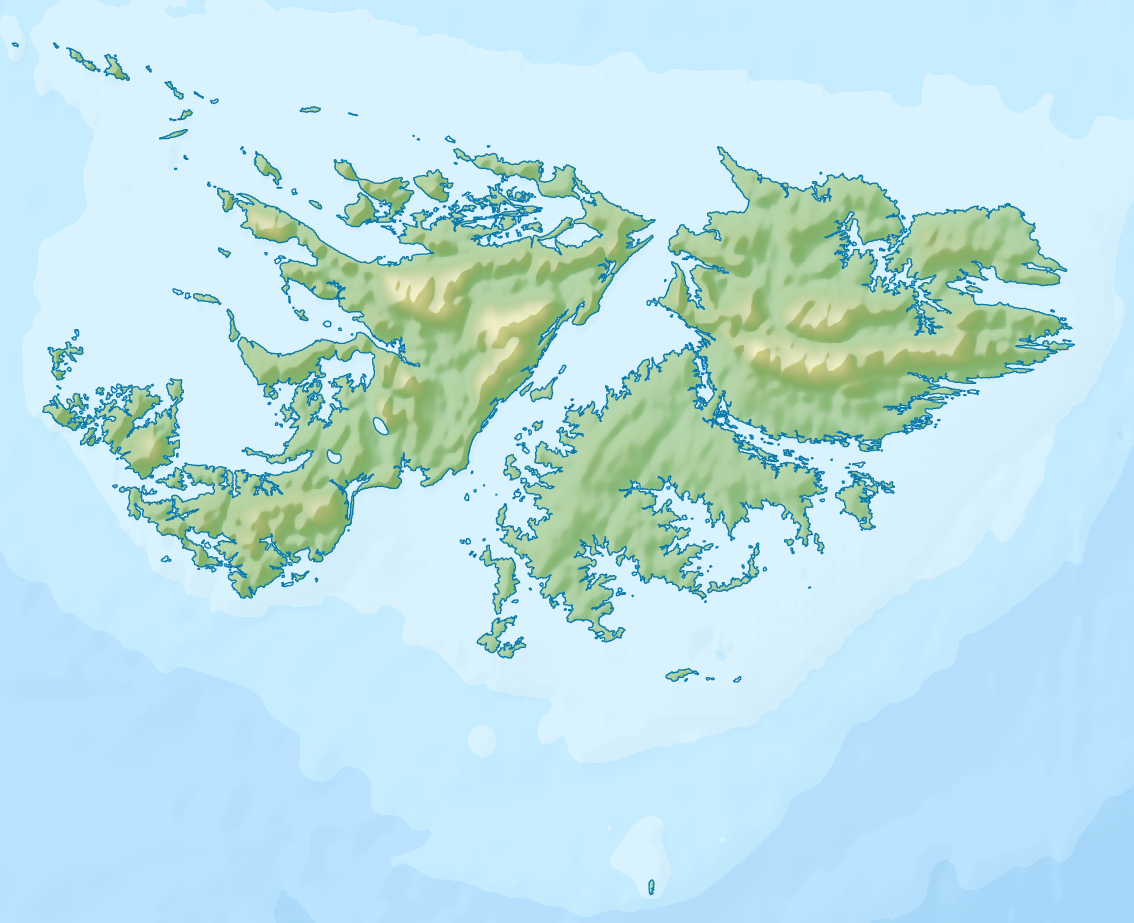
- Location of mouth

Location
- Country: United Kingdom
- Dependency: Falkland Islands
- Region: East Falkland

Physical characteristics
- Mouth
  - coordinates: 51°30′S 59°02′W

San Carlos River (historically written as River San Carlos) is the longest river on East Falkland in the Falkland Islands. It flows westwards for 24 mi (39 km) into San Carlos Water, near Port San Carlos. It begins in the Wickham Heights, with tributaries running off Jack's Mountain

From Port San Carlos to Fanning Head is 6 miles (9.7 km); Fanning Head is where the estuarial river falls into the open sea.
