= Jack's Mountain =

Hill on East Falkland, in the Falkland Islands

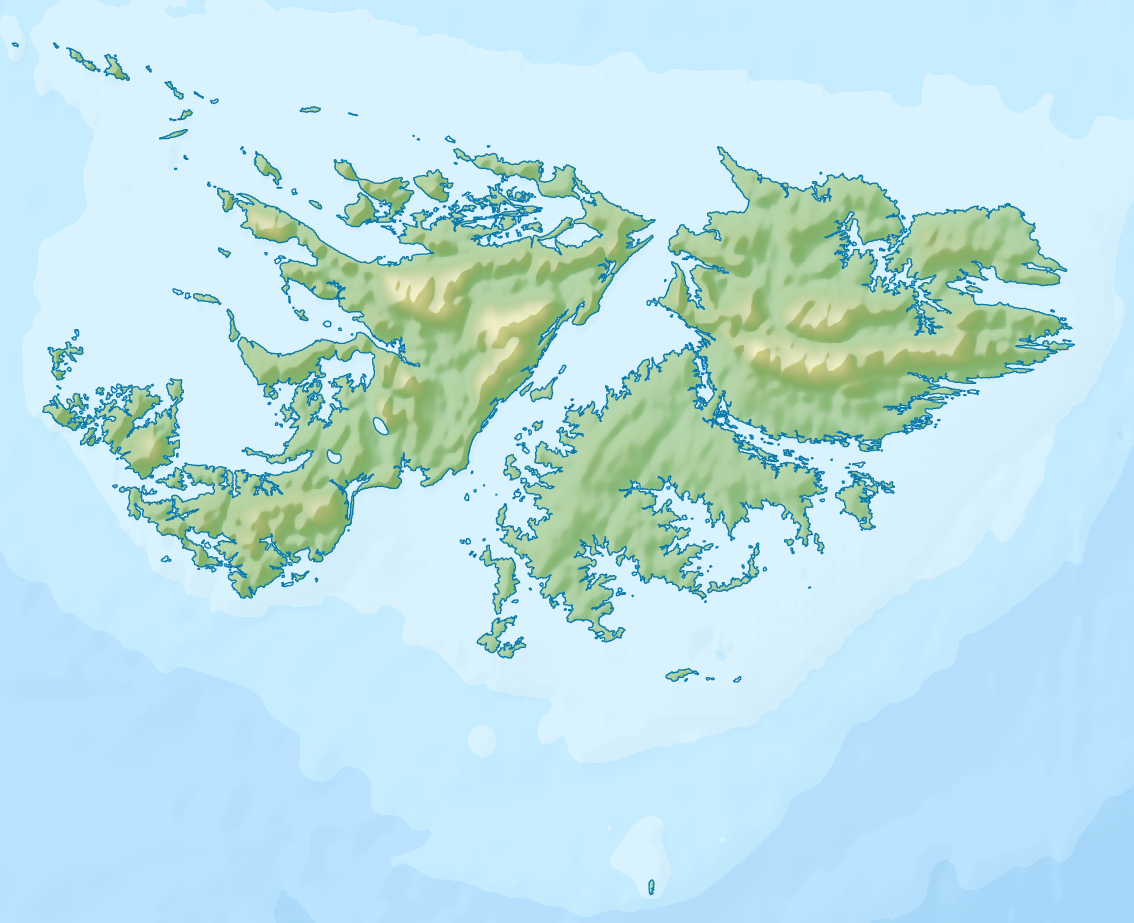
- Location within Falkland Islands

Highest point
- Elevation: 648 m (2,126 ft)
- Coordinates: 51.566°S 58.473°W

Geography
- Location: East Falkland, Falkland Islands, south Atlantic Ocean

Jack's Mountain is a mountain on East Falkland, in the Falkland Islands. It is 648 metres (2,126 ft) high, making it one of the tallest in East Falkland after Mount Usborne.
