= Mount Challenger =

Mountain in the Falkland Islands

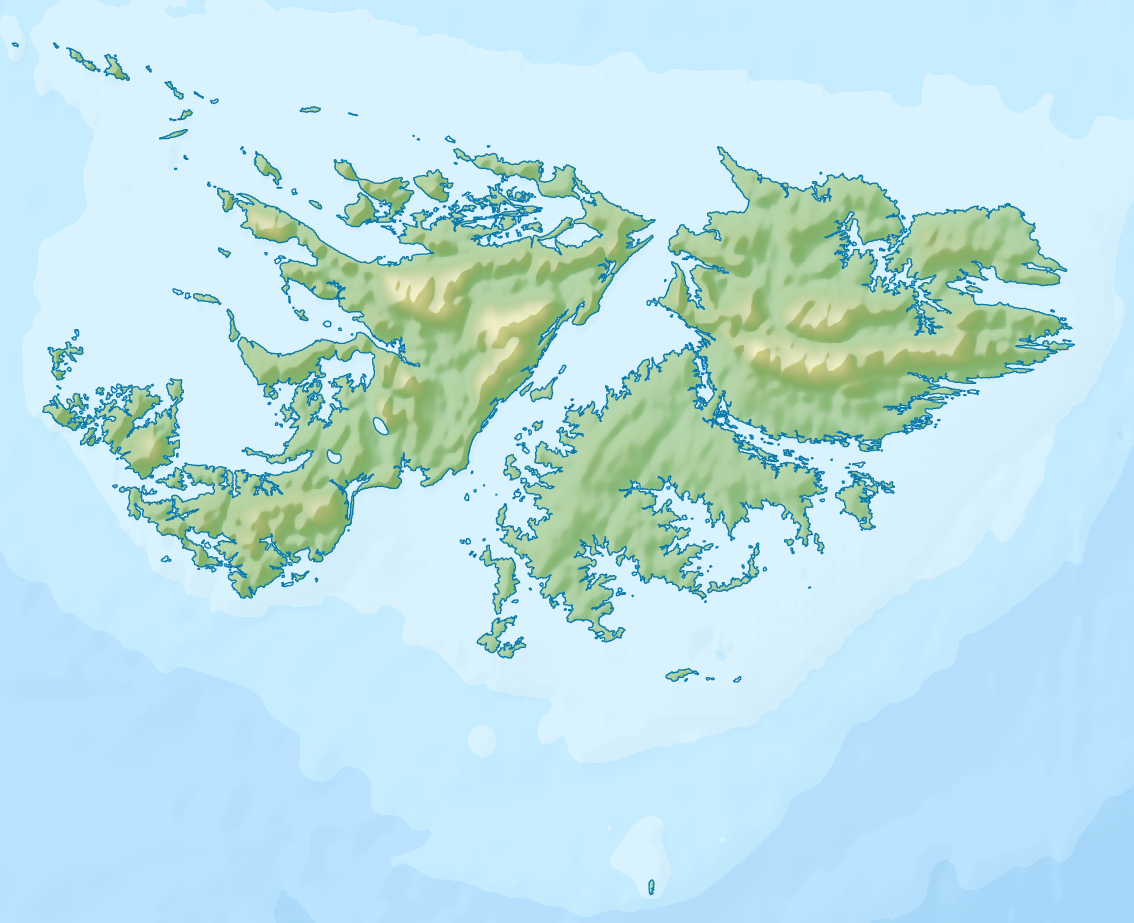
- Location within Falkland Islands

Highest point
- Elevation: 333 m (1,093 ft)
- Coordinates: 51.708°S 58.130°W

Geography
- Location: East Falkland, Falkland Islands, south Atlantic Ocean

Position of Mount Challenger relative to other surrounding hills

Mount Challenger is a hill on East Falkland, Falkland Islands. It is south of Mount Kent. The area saw some action during the Falklands War, and some of it is still mined. The Murrell River rises on Mount Challenger.
