= Mount Usborne =

Mountain on East Falkland, Falkland Islands

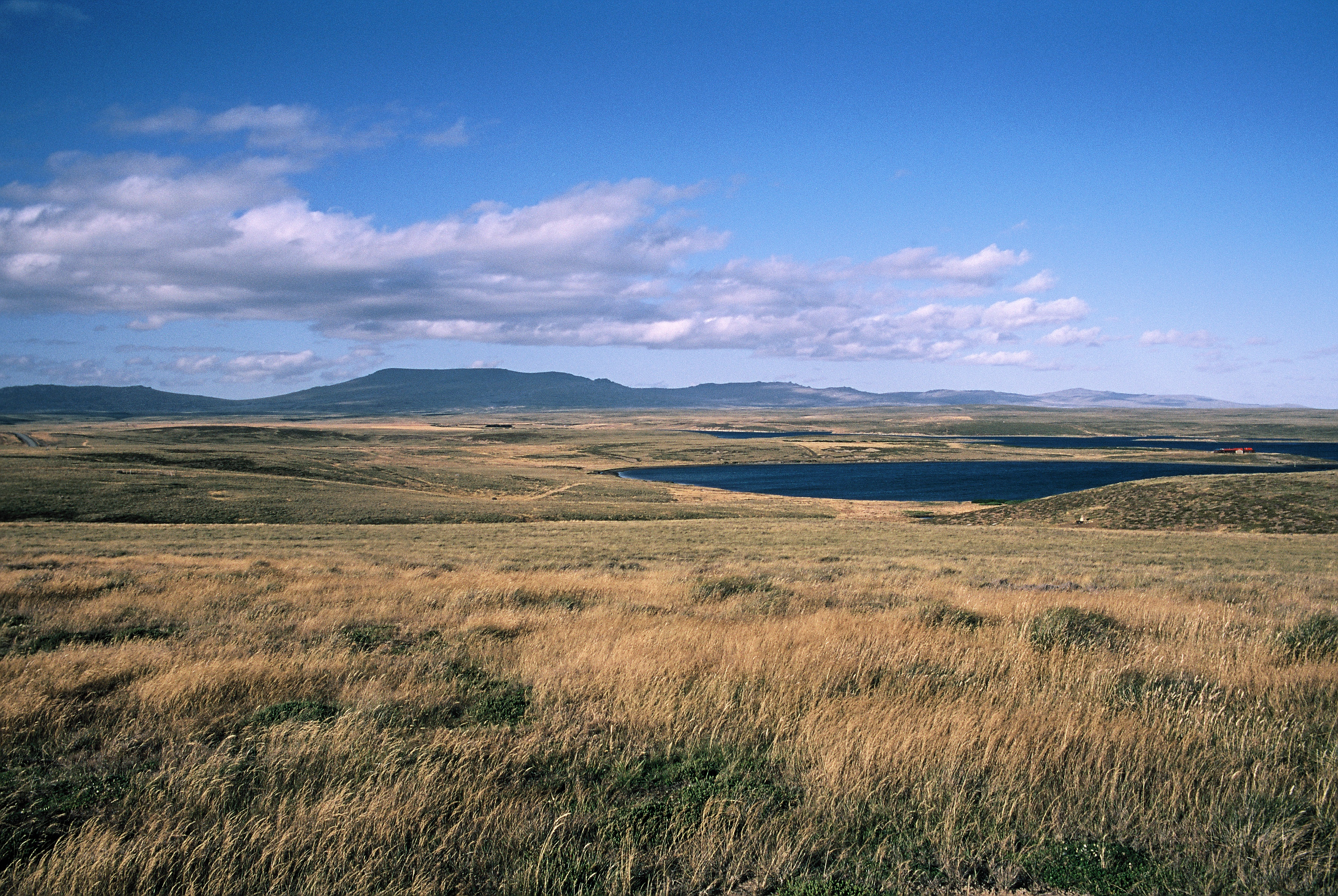

Highest point
- Elevation: 705 metres (2,312 ft)
- Prominence: 705 metres (2,312 ft)
- Parent peak: none – Highest peak on the Falkland Islands
- Isolation: 507.9 km (315.6 mi)
- Coordinates: 51°41′30″S 58°50′04″W

Geography
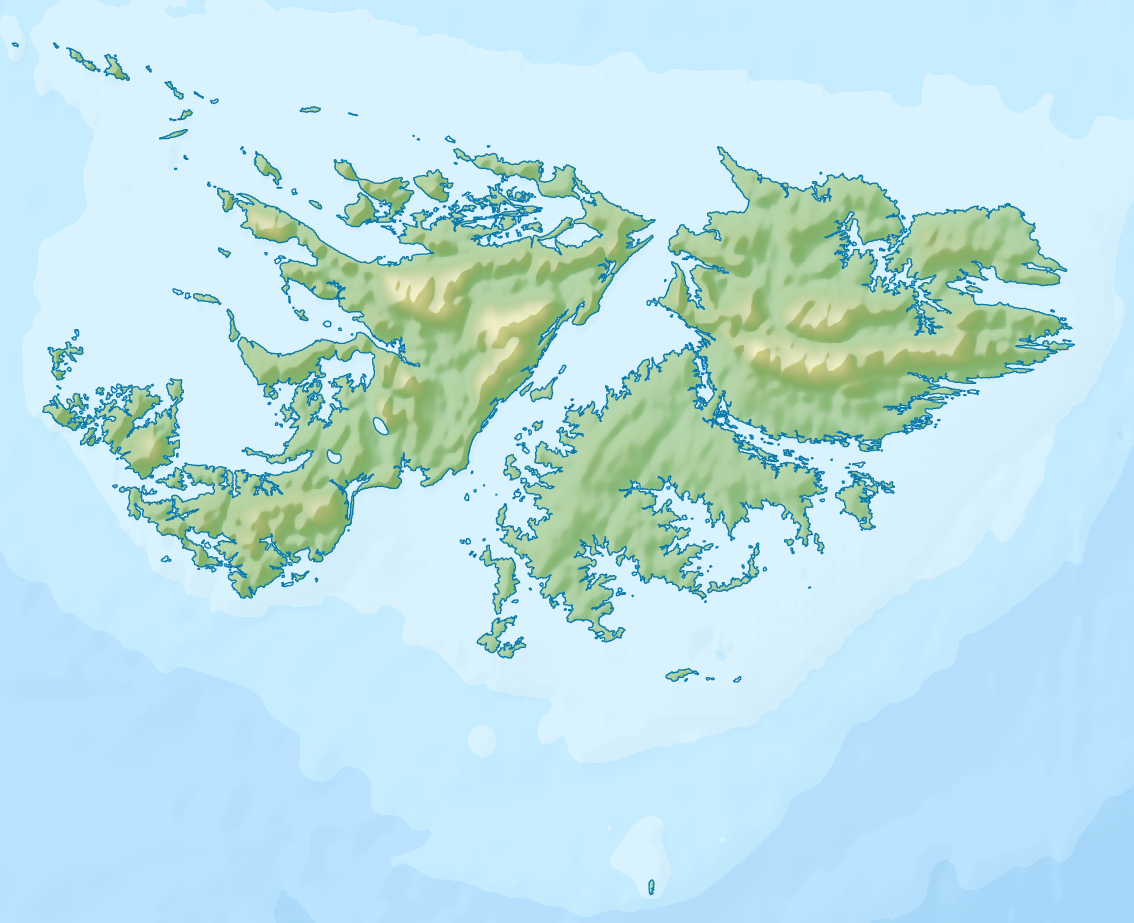
- Location within Falkland Islands
- Location: East Falkland, Falkland Islands, south Atlantic Ocean
- Parent range: Wickham Heights

Mount Usborne (Spanish: Cerro Alberdi) is a mountain on East Falkland. At 705 m (2,312 ft) above sea level, it is the highest point in the Falkland Islands. It is 5 metres (16 ft) taller than Mount Adam, the highest peak on West Falkland. The mountain lies some 33 miles (53 km) west of Stanley, and was used as a radar orientation point during the first successful Black Buck raid on the airfield at Stanley.

The mountain is referenced by Charles Darwin in Chapter 9 of Zoology of the Voyage of H.M.S. Beagle. It is named after Alexander Burns Usborne, master's assistant on HMS Beagle, the ship that took Darwin on his voyage.

As one of the highest mountains of the Falklands, it is thought that the peak experienced some glaciation. The remains of glacial cirques can be seen on the mountain, and on its north-eastern slope lies Black Tarn. The tarn was subject to depth testing in 1981 and 2014, with soundings suggesting a depth of 13 metres (43 ft) in 1981, however the team from 2014 only found a depth down to 10 metres (33 ft). Core samples were also taken from the edge of the tarn during the 2014 study, and these revealed charcoals from fire events that could suggest pre-European human activity in the area.

The San Carlos River rises on the northern flank of the mountain and flows north then westwards towards San Carlos. Stone runs are present on the slopes of Mount Usborne, but like elsewhere in the Falklands above 300–400 metres (980–1,310 ft), the runs are composed of finer, closer-spaced, jumbled and uneven rocks than those of the stone runs at lower elevations. The handful of Falklands mountains over 600 m (2,000 ft) have

... pronounced corries with small glacial lakes at their bases, morainic ridges deposited below the corries suggest that the glaciers and ice domes were confined to areas of maximum elevation with other parts of the islands experiencing a periglacial climate.

== Sources ==
- Stonehouse, B (ed.) Encyclopedia of Antarctica and the Southern Oceans (2002, ISBN 0-471-98665-8)
