= Mount Emery =

Mountain in the Falkland Islands

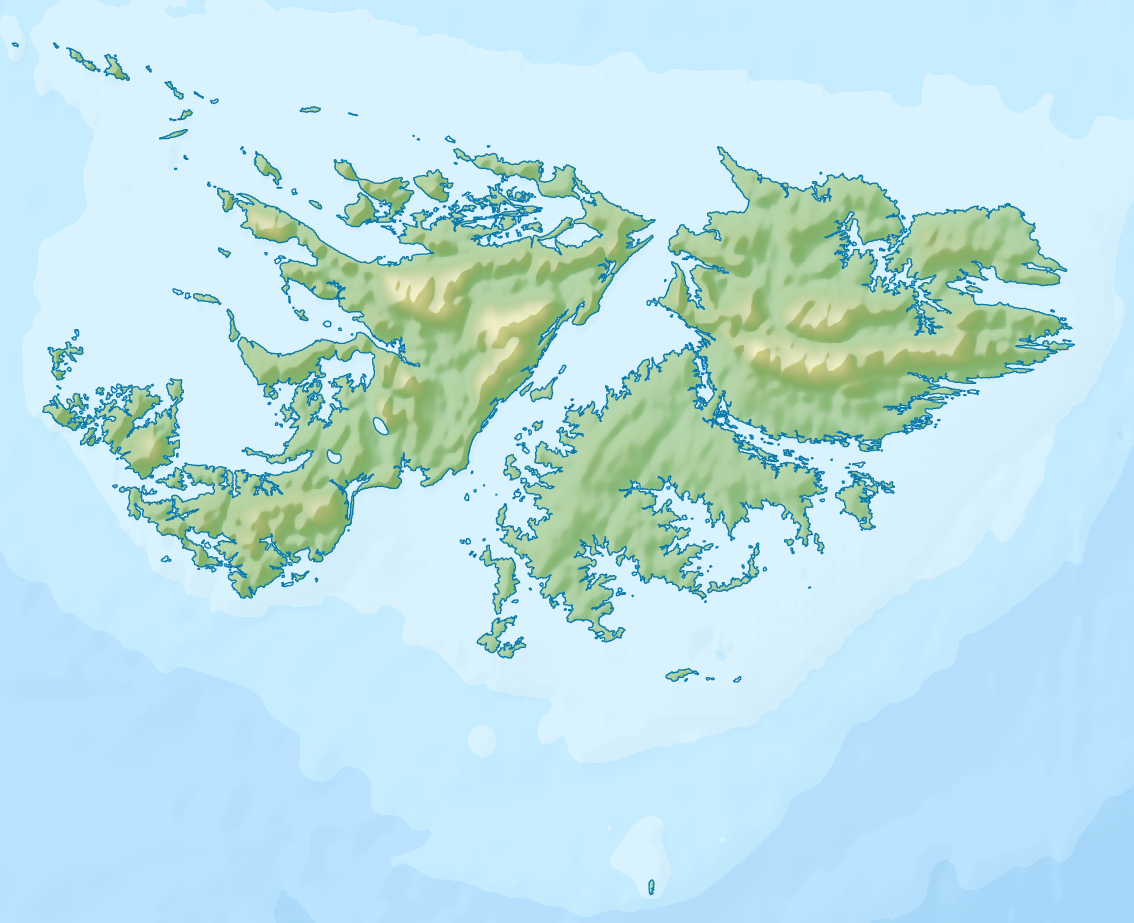
- Location within Falkland Islands

Highest point
- Coordinates: 52.049°S 60.374°W

Geography
- Location: West Falkland, Falkland Islands, south Atlantic Ocean

Mount Emery is a mountain on West Falkland, Falkland Islands. It is north east of Mount Young.
