= Mount Young (Falkland Islands) =

Mountain on West Falkland in the Falkland Islands(mount young)

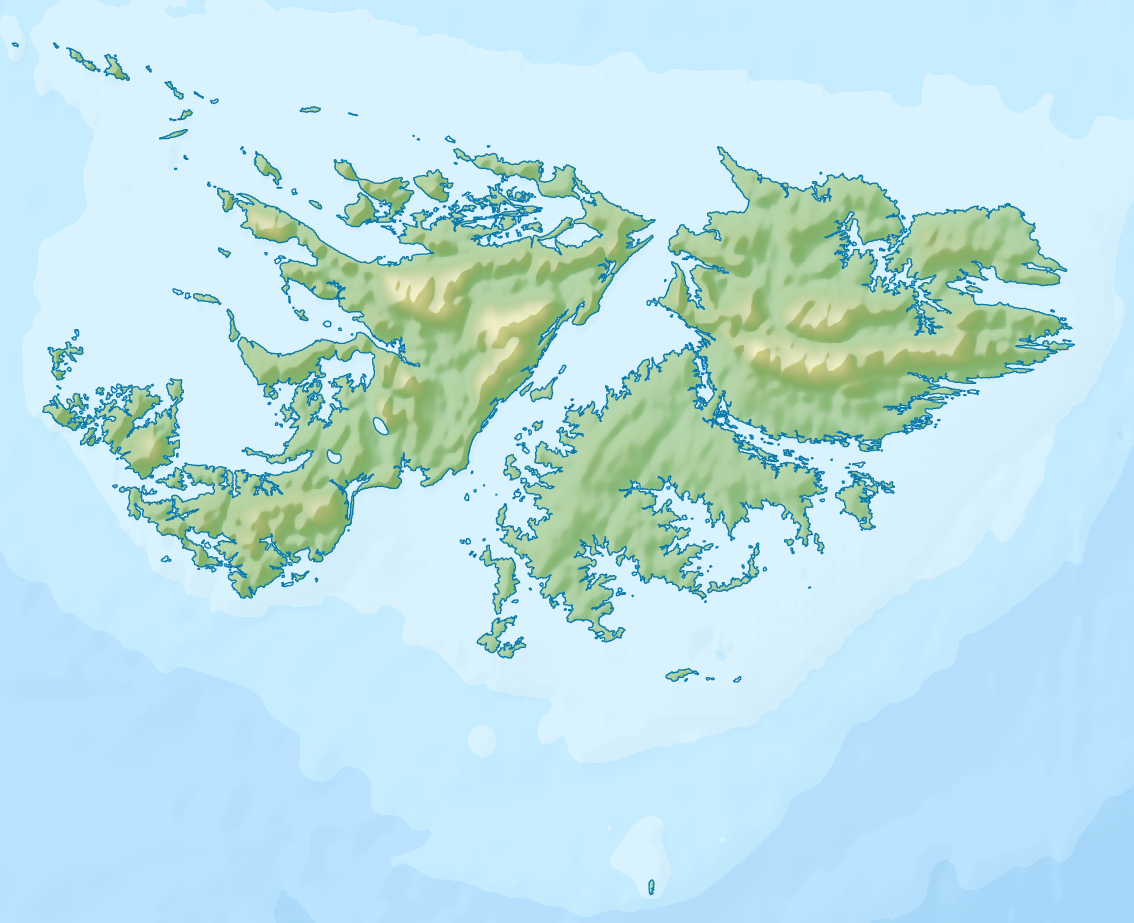
- Location within Falkland Islands

Highest point
- Elevation: 361 metres (1,184 ft)
- Coordinates: 52.083°S 60.588°W

Geography
- Location: West Falkland, Falkland Islands, south Atlantic Ocean

Mount Young is a mountain on West Falkland in the Falkland Islands, reaching a height of 361 metres (1,184 ft). It is in the far south of the island, near Cape Meredith and Port Albemarle It is east of Port Stephens and is south west of Mount Emery.
