= Smoko Mount =

Mountain on East Falkland

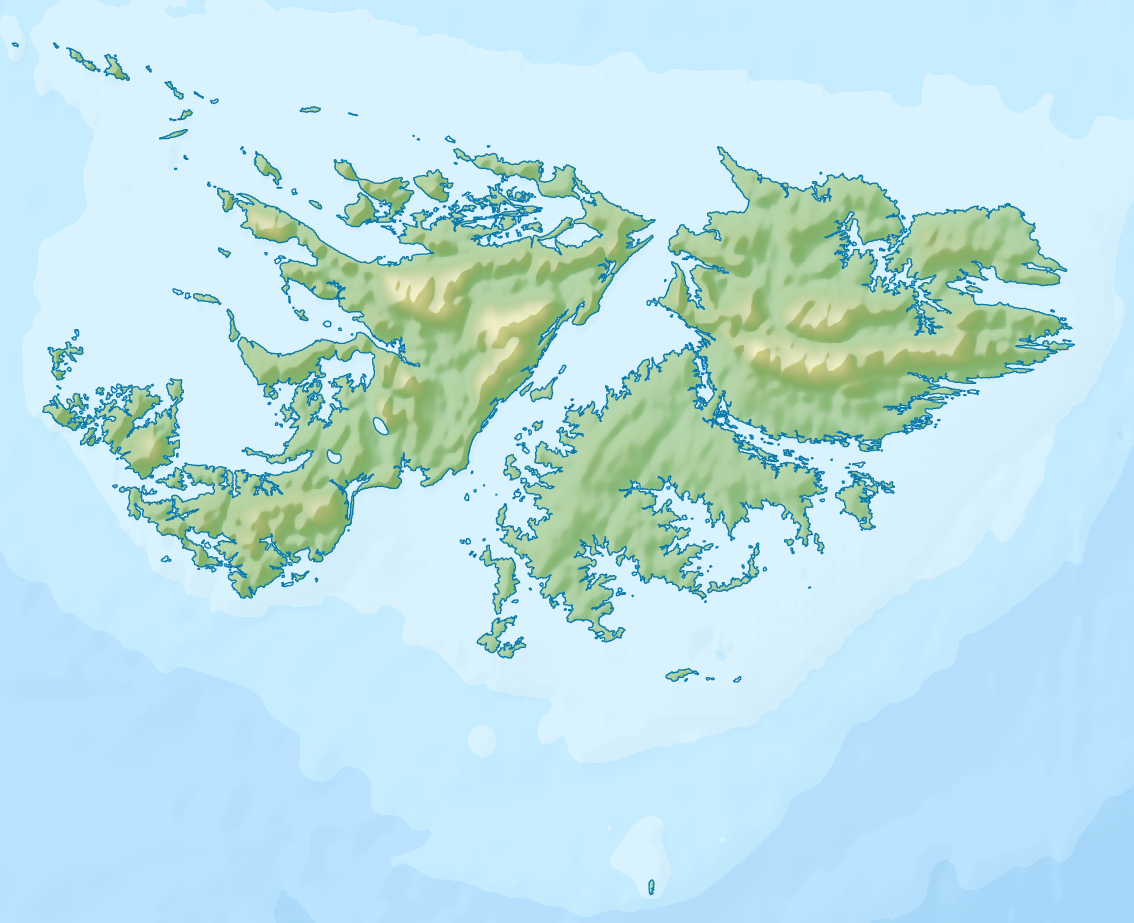
- Location within Falkland Islands

Highest point
- Elevation: 397 m (1,302 ft)
- Coordinates: 51.718°S 58.196°W

Geography
- Location: East Falkland, Falkland Islands, south Atlantic Ocean

Smoko Mount is a hill on East Falkland, Falkland Islands. "Smoko" is Falkland Islands English for a smoking break.
