= Mount Wickham =

Mountain on East Falkland, Falkland Islands

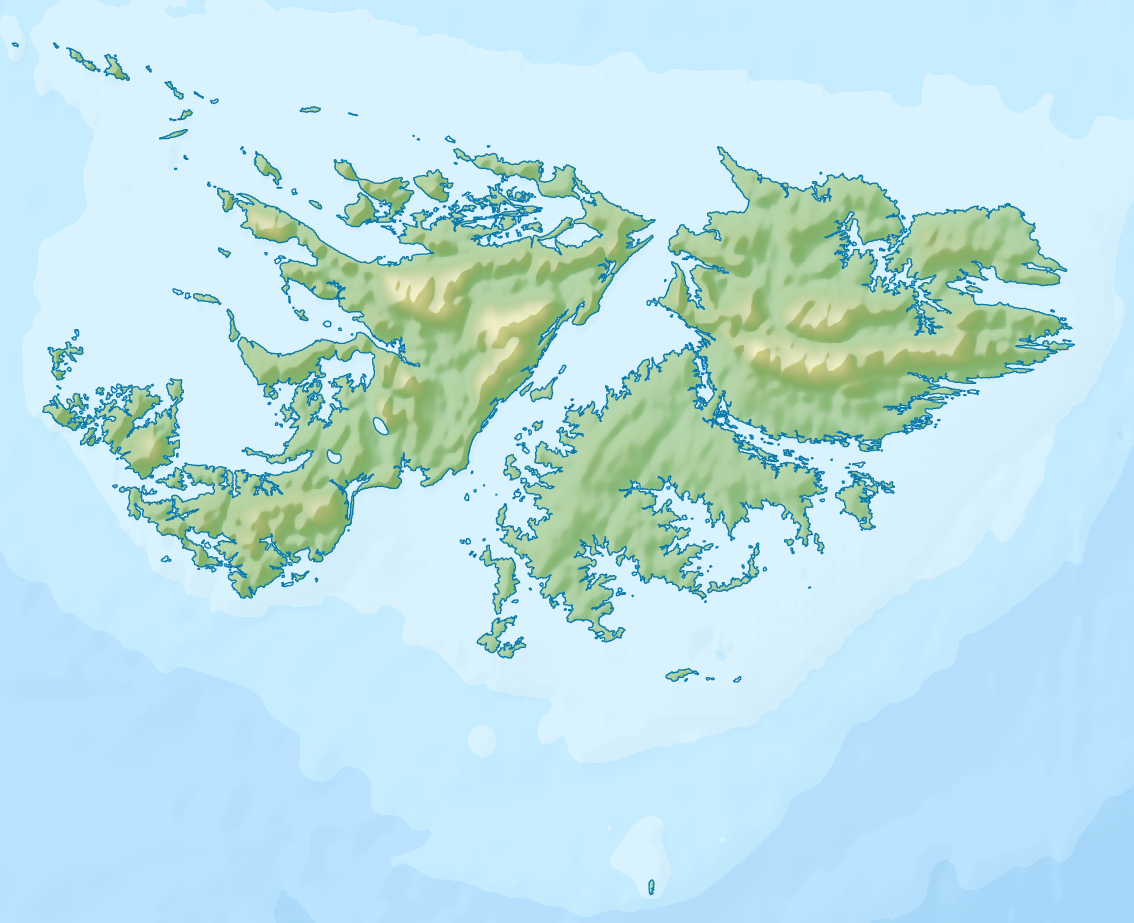
- Location within Falkland Islands

Highest point
- Elevation: 605 metres (1,985 ft)
- Coordinates: 51.734°S 58.532°W

Geography
- Location: East Falkland, Falkland Islands, south Atlantic Ocean

Mount Wickham is a mountain on East Falkland, Falkland Islands. It is the chief summit of the Wickham Heights. Its elevation is 605 metres (1,985 ft).
