= East Falkland =

Island in the Falkland Islands

- Location of East Falkland (red) in the Falkland Islands (red & white)

Geography
- Location: South Atlantic Ocean
- Coordinates: 52°0′0″S 59°0′0″W
- Archipelago: Falkland Islands
- Area: 6,605 km^{2} (2,550 sq mi)
- Area rank: 1st^{[a]}
- Highest elevation: 705 m (2313 ft)
- Highest point: Mount Usborne

Administration
- United Kingdom
- Overseas Territory: Falkland Islands
- Largest settlement: Stanley

Demographics
- Population: 3,011 (2021)
- Population rank: 1st^{[b]}
- a. All islands in the Falkland Islands. b. All inhabited islands in the Falkland Islands.

East Falkland (Spanish: Isla Soledad) is the largest island of the Falklands in the South Atlantic, having an area of 6,605 km^{2} (2,550 square miles) or 54% of the total area of the Falklands. The island consists of two main land masses, of which the more southerly is known as Lafonia; it is joined by a narrow isthmus where the settlement of Goose Green is located, and it was the scene of the Battle of Goose Green during the Falklands War.

The two main centres of population in the Falklands, Stanley and Mount Pleasant, which are both in the northern half of East Falkland, are home to three-quarters of the island's population.

== Geography ==
East Falkland, which has an area of 6,605 km^{2} (2,550 square miles), a little over half the total area of the islands consists of two land masses of approximately equal size. The island is almost bisected by two deep fjords, Choiseul Sound and Brenton Loch-Grantham Sound, which are separated by the 2.2 kilometres (1.4 mi) wide isthmus that connects Lafonia in the south to the northern part of East Falkland. The island's 1,670 km (1,040-mile) coastline has many smaller bays, inlets and headlands.

The northern part of the island, apart from the coastal strip bordering the Choiseul Sound, is largely underlain by Palaeozoic rocks in the form of quartzite and slate, which tend to form rugged landscapes and coastlines and to cause the soil to be poor and acidic. The principal range of hills, the 600 m (2,000 feet) Wickham Heights, runs from east to west. The highest point of the range (also the highest point in the Falklands) is Mount Usborne which has a height of 705 m (2,313 ft). The area away from the mountain range consists chiefly of low undulating ground, a mixture of pasture and morass, with many shallow freshwater tarns, and small streams running in the valleys. Two inlets, Berkeley Sound and Port William, run far into the land at the north-eastern extremity of the island and provide anchorage for shipping.

In contrast, Lafonia is underlain by Mesozoic rocks (sandstone), a younger rock than the Palaeozoic rock to the north, giving a flatter landscape than is seen elsewhere on the island.

Other scenery includes Mount Simon, stone runs, heathland, and bogs. Gypsy Cove is noted as a beauty spot.

== Population and infrastructure ==
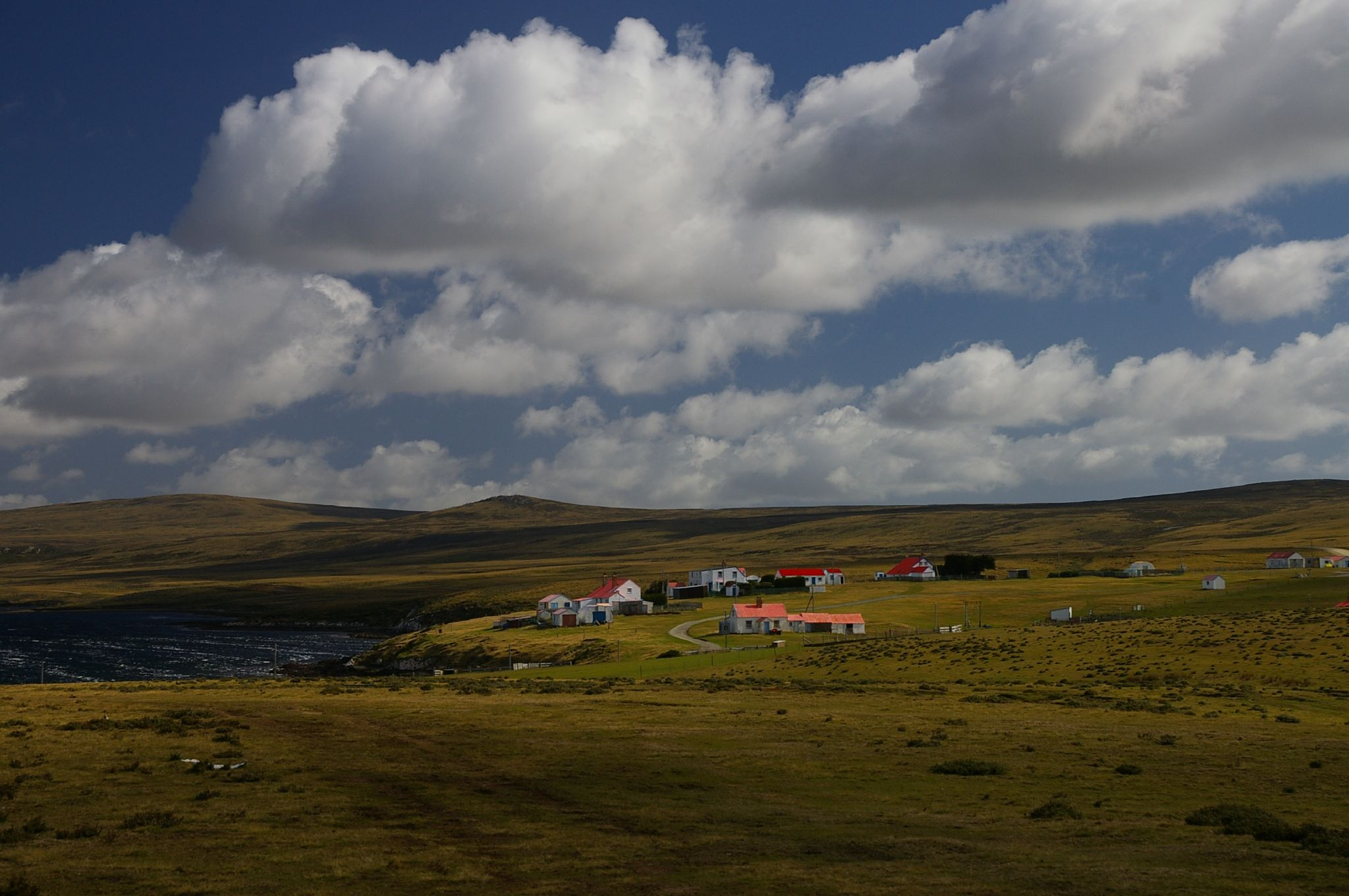
Johnson's Harbour settlement.

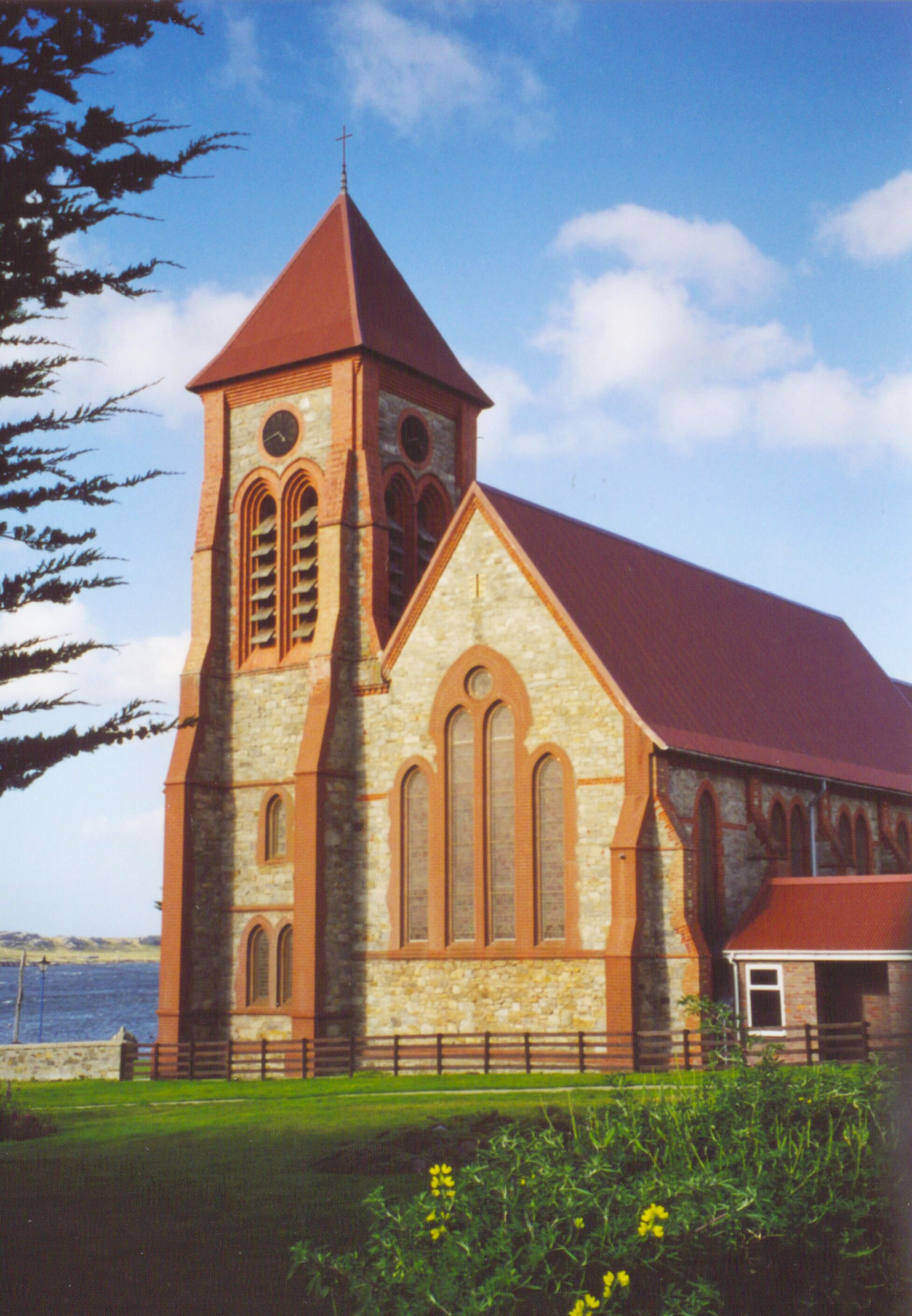
Christ Church Cathedral in Stanley

Stanley, the capital of the islands and the main seaport, is in East Falkland. The islands' (Anglican) Christ Church Cathedral is also in Stanley.

Port Louis, at the head of Berkeley Sound, was once the seat of government. However, the anchorage there was found to be rather too exposed, and about 1844 a town was laid out, and the necessary public buildings were erected, on Stanley Harbour, a sheltered recess within Port William.

Other settlements include Port Louis, Darwin, Port San Carlos, San Carlos, Salvador, Johnson's Harbour, Fitzroy, Mare Harbour, and Goose Green.

East Falkland also has two airports with paved runways, Port Stanley Airport and RAF Mount Pleasant. There is a lighthouse at Cape Pembroke near Stanley. East Falkland contains most of the archipelago's few roads.

== Economy ==
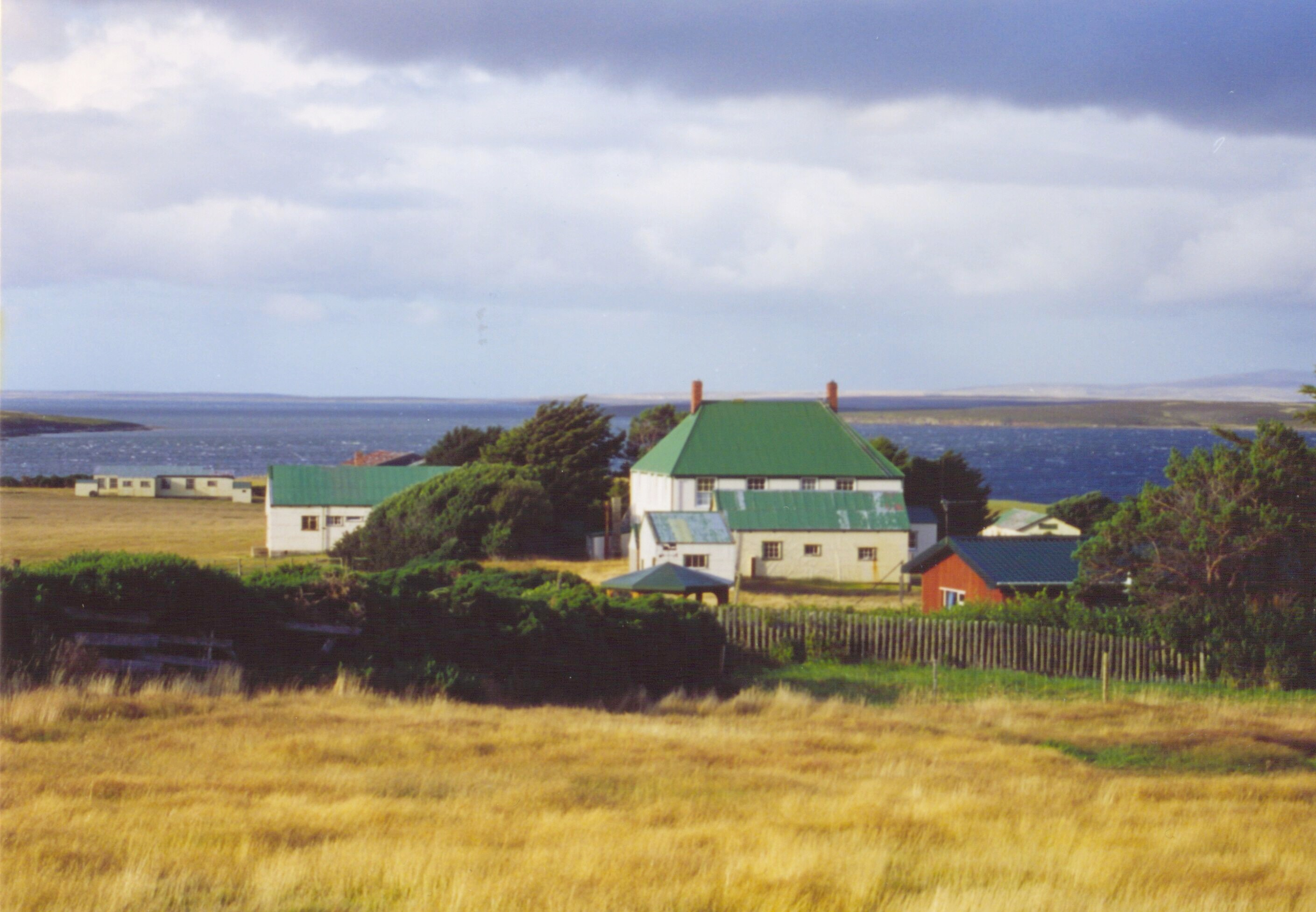
House in East Falkland (Teal Inlet)

The main industries on the island are fishing, sheep farming, and tourism. Some oats are also grown, but due to high humidity and acidic soil, the land is mainly used for grazing.

As Stanley is the capital, and East Falkland is the most populous island, it performs an economic role as the hub of the archipelago. Many cruise ships now stop there.

A large economic role is also played by RAF Mount Pleasant, which has a number of British military personnel based there. Although these number a few hundred, their economic role in a population of under two thousand is significant.

Smaller industries include horse and cattle farming, and there is also recent evidence to suggest possible valuable mineral deposits on the island.

== Wildlife ==
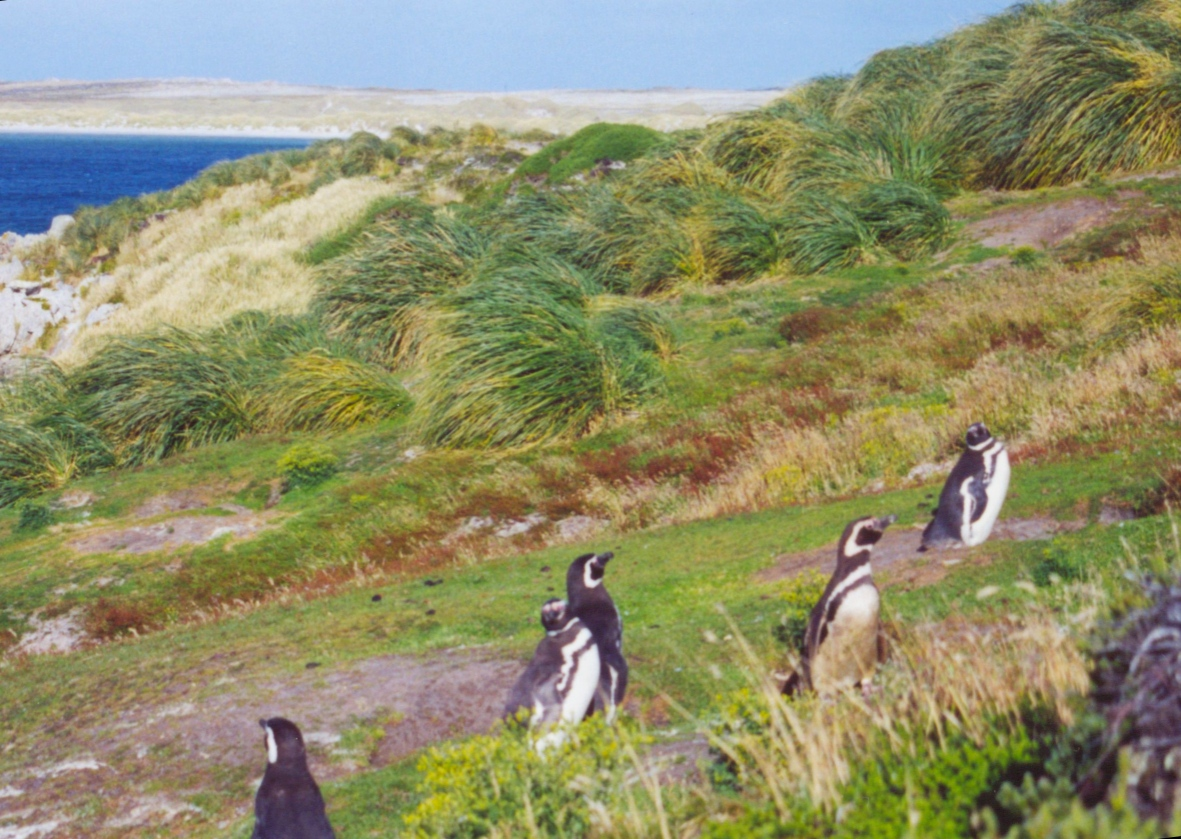
Gypsy Cove, East Falkland

Due to more intensive human settlement, East Falkland has the corresponding conservation problems. The warrah was one of the first casualties, as Darwin says in The Voyage of the Beagle:

"The only quadruped native to the island is a large wolf-like fox (Canis antarcticus), which is common to both East and West Falkland. I have no doubt it is a peculiar species... Their numbers have rapidly decreased; they are already banished from that half of the island which lies to the eastward of the neck of land between St. Salvador Bay and Berkeley Sound. Within a very few years after these islands shall have become regularly settled, in all probability this fox will be classed with the dodo, as an animal which has perished from the face of the earth."

Rats have also been introduced, but despite this, the island has a great deal of marine life, including penguins of various kinds.

Guanacos were unsuccessfully introduced in 1862 to East Falkland south of Mt Pleasant where Prince Alfred hunted them in 1871. They have since become extinct, but are still on Staats Island.

Charles Darwin surveyed the area's wildlife, while on HMS Beagle.

== History ==
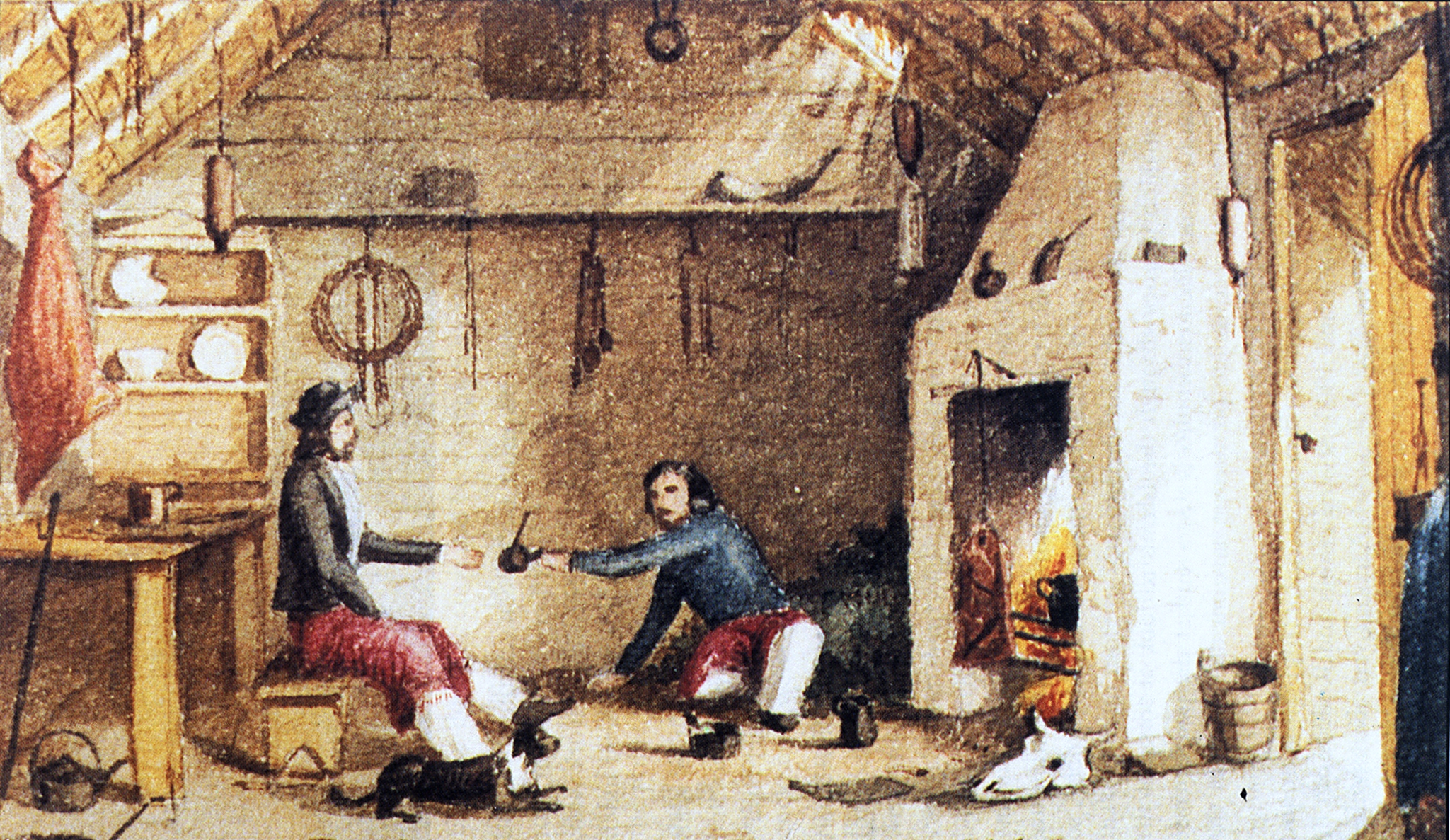
Falkland gauchos having mate at Hope Place – Saladero, East Falkland. Watercolour by Dale, manager of Hope Place in the 1850s.

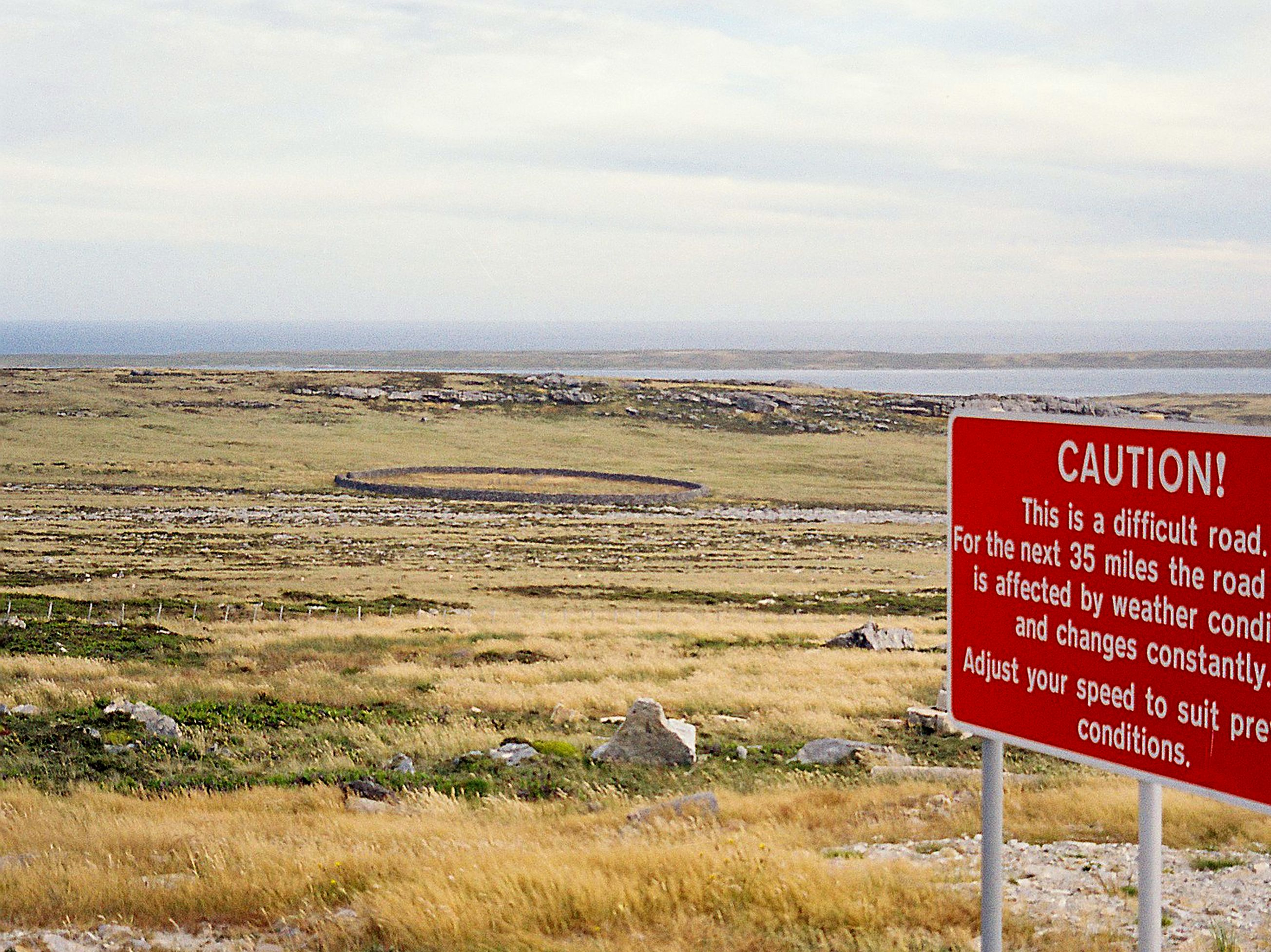
One of the remaining historic corrals at Sapper Hill, near Stanley

The first permanent settlement on East Falkland began with Louis de Bougainville establishing Port Louis on Berkeley Sound in 1764. The French settlement included a number of Bretons, and the islands became known as "Îles Malouines" (the islands of St Malo), later Hispanicised as "Islas Malvinas". For years, Port Louis was the main settlement, not only on East Falkland, but the entire archipelago and a subject of controversy.

In October 1820, Colonel David Jewett sought shelter in the islands after his ship, the frigate Heroina, was damaged in a storm. Jewett was an American privateer employed as captain by the Buenos Aires businessman Patrick Lynch, who had obtained a privateering licence for the ship from the Buenos Aires Supreme Director Jose Rondeau. On 6 November 1820 he raised the flag of the United Provinces of the River Plate at Port Louis and claimed possession of the entire archipelago in the name of the United Provinces of the South (which later became the United Provinces of The River Plate and ultimately Argentina). Eyewitnesses present, such as James Weddell, felt the ceremony was designed simply to establish a salvage claim over a French wreck.

In 1823, Argentina granted fishing rights to Jorge Pacheco and Luis Vernet. Their first expedition to the islands ended in failure and Pacheco abandoned the venture. Vernet persisted with a second expedition in 1826. also ending in failure due to the combination of the Brazilian blockade of Argentina and the conditions encountered. Vernet finally succeeded in establishing a settlement at Puerto Soledad in 1828. Prior to both expeditions, Vernet had approached the British consulate in Buenos Aires, seeking permission for his venture in the islands. Subsequently, Vernet furnished the consulate with progress reports and urged the establishment of a permanent British garrison in the islands.

In 1829, Vernet approached the Government of Buenos Aires requesting the settlement be supported by a naval vessel. The request was refused, and instead Vernet was proclaimed to be Governor and authorised to act using his own resources. The British consul lodged a formal protest over the proclamation, which went unanswered. Vernet assured the British consul that his interest was purely commercial and once more urged the British to establish a permanent presence in the islands. Vernet was the first person to be proclaimed Governor, although modern Argentine texts claim the captains of the Heroina and Pachego as "governors".

"Puerto Luis", as it was renamed, became a seal hunting base and small fishing port. Vernet later seized an American ship, the Harriet, for breaking a monopoly he had proclaimed on seal hunting, one not recognised by either the American or British Governments. (Both formally disputed the restrictions through their consuls in Buenos Aires.) Property on board the ship was seized and the captain was sent to Buenos Aires to stand trial. Vernet accompanied him. The American Consul in Argentina strongly protested Vernet's actions, stating the United States did not recognise Argentine sovereignty over the Falklands.

The American consul dispatched the USS Lexington to Puerto Luis to retake the confiscated property, as well as the ships "Superior" and "Breakwater", which had also been seized. In 1832, the USS Lexington attacked Puerto Luis, an act which was later condoned by the American ambassador in Buenos Aires, who declared the Falkland Islands to be free from any ruling power. Modern Argentina claims the Americans destroyed the settlement, but Captain Duncan's log tells of only spiking the cannons and destroying the powder store. Duncan arrested the seven senior members of Vernet's settlement for piracy and provided transport to Montevideo for any member of the settlement who wished to leave. The majority of the population decided to leave, claiming Vernet had misled them about the miserable conditions in the islands. Following these events, Vernet resigned as Governor. The Argentine Government then appointed Esteban José Francisco Mestivier as governor, and sought to establish a penal colony in the islands. (Mestivier's appointment was in fact the only Argentine appointment to follow the norms of the time and was properly gazetted.). Shortly after his arrival, however, Mestivier was murdered by his own men and the settlement was in chaos.

These events spurred Britain to return to the islands, (See Re-establishment of British rule on the Falklands (1833)), requesting that the Argentine military presence leave on 3 January 1833 (though remaining members of the settlement were encouraged to stay). "Puerto Luis" was renamed "Ansons Harbour", but reverted to "Port Louis" in line with the original French name of the settlement Port Saint Louis. It became both a naval garrison and civilian settlement.

Shortly after this, the second voyage of HMS Beagle surveyed the island. The names of two settlements on East Falkland, Darwin and Fitzroy, commemorate Charles Darwin and Robert FitzRoy. On 15 March 1833, an unimpressed Darwin wrote

After the possession of these miserable islands had been contested by France, Spain, and England, they were left uninhabited. The government of Buenos Aires then sold them to a private individual, but likewise used them, as old Spain had done before, for a penal settlement. England claimed her right and seized them. The Englishman who was left in charge of the flag was consequently murdered. A British officer was next sent, unsupported by any power: and when we arrived, we found him in charge of a population, of which rather more than half were runaway rebels and murderers. (The Voyage of the Beagle.)

In November 1836, the island was surveyed by Admiral George Grey, and further in 1837 by Lowcay. Admiral Grey described their first view of East Falkland –

We anchored a little after sunset off a creek called 'Johnson's Harbour'. The day having been cloudy with occasional showers, these islands at all times dreary enough, looked particularly so on our first view of them, the shores of sound, steep, with bare hills intersected with ravines rising from them, these hills without a tree and the clouds hanging low, gave them exactly the appearance of the Cheviots or a Scotch moor on a winter's day and considering we were in the May of these latitudes, the first impression of the climate was not favourable, the weather however, was not cold, the thermometer was 63 degrees which is Howick mid-summer temperature.

In 1845 Samuel Fisher Lafone, a wealthy cattle and hide merchant from Montevideo, obtained a grant of the southern portion of the East Falkland from the British government. He purchased the peninsula, 600,000 acres (2,400 km^{2}) in extent, together with all the wild cattle on East Falkland, for a period of six years, for the sum of £10,000 down, and £20,000 in ten years from 1 January 1852. In 1851 the Falkland Islands Company, which had been incorporated by charter in the same year, paid £30,000 for Lafone's interest in Lafonia, as the peninsula came to be called. Lafone had never even visited the islands. The only remaining signs of this venture are the ruins at Hope Place and the stone corral at Darwin.

In 1859, the town of Darwin was founded.

Although used for sheep farming since the early nineteenth century, East Falkland was dominated by cattle farming until the 1850s.

In 1925 the Bodie Suspension Bridge was built across a creek in Lafonia, and is claimed to be the southernmost in the world. It is still in pedestrian use today.

=== 1982 invasion and Falklands War ===
In April 1982, East Falkland was invaded by Argentina. The Governor, Rex Hunt, was informed by the British Government of a possible Argentinian invasion on Wednesday 31 March. Hunt summoned the two senior Royal Marines officers of Naval Party 8901 to Government House in Stanley to discuss how to defend the Falklands. Major Mike Norman was given overall command of the Marines because of his seniority, while Major Gary Noott became Hunt's military advisor. The total strength was only 68 Marines and 11 sailors, which nevertheless was more than would normally have been available, since the garrison was in the process of changing over. Their numbers were reinforced by 25 Falkland Islands Defence Force (FIDF) members. The FIDF commanding officer, Major Phil Sommers, tasked the volunteer militiamen with guarding key points including the telephone exchange, the radio station and the power station. Jack Solis, commanding the civilian coastal ship Forrest, operated his vessel as an improvised radar screen station off Stanley.

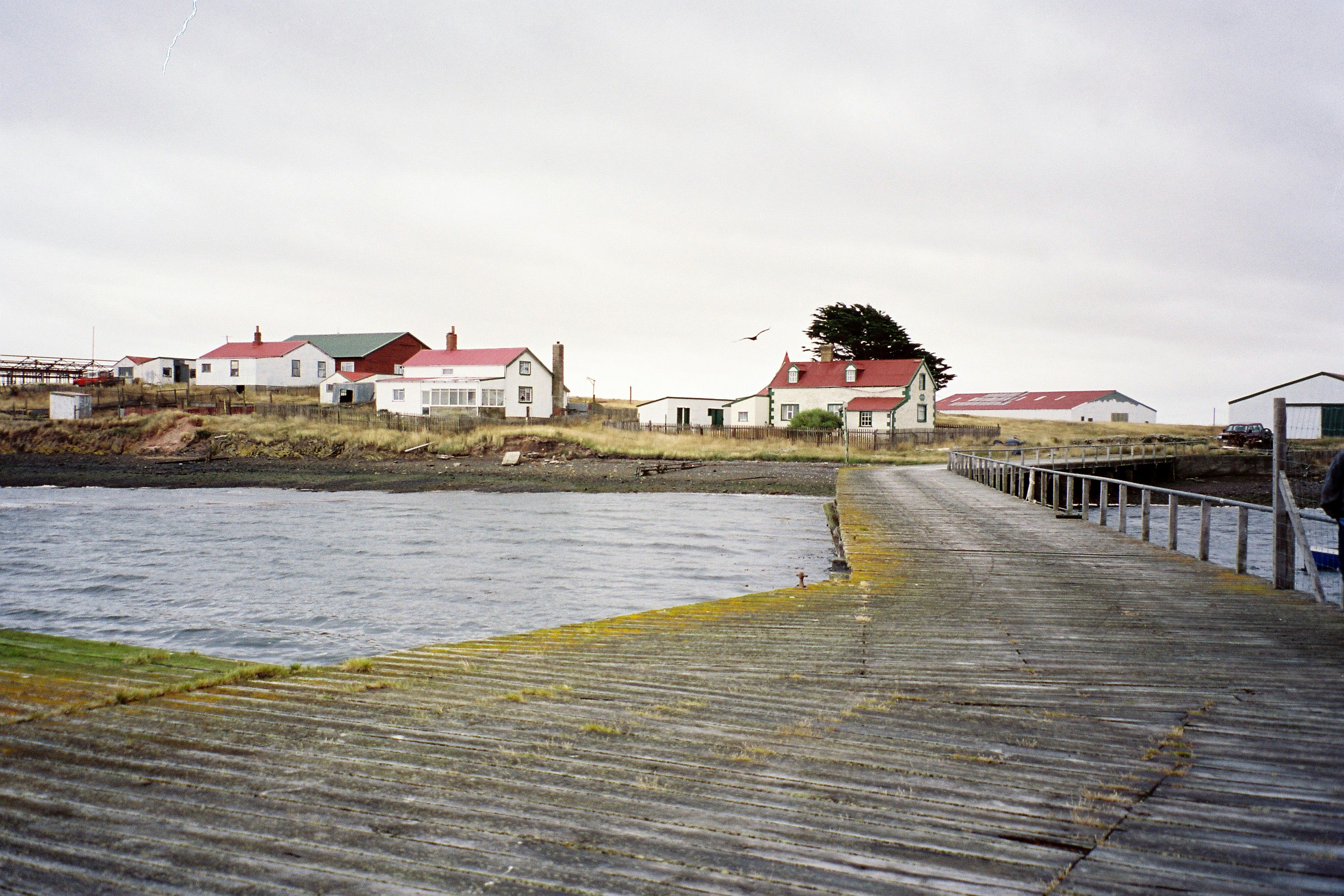
Goose Green

East Falkland was also the location of the bulk of the land-based action in the Falklands War. As a result, some areas of "Camp" in East Falkland were still heavily mined until 2020, when all de-mining was completed in the Falkland Islands. Areas that saw intensive combat included Goose Green, San Carlos, Mount Longdon and the Two Sisters ridge.

==== List of East Falkland battles ====
- Battle of Goose Green
- Battle of Mount Harriet
- Battle of Two Sisters
- Battle of Mount Longdon
- Battle of Mount Tumbledown
- Battle of Wireless Ridge

== Present day ==
Following the Falklands War, Britain increased its military presence on the East Falkland. The Falkland Islands Government has invested heavily in improving facilities in Stanley and transportation around the islands, tarmacking many roads. The population has risen, because of the growth of Stanley, but has declined in Camp. Most of the improvements in the islands have taken place on East Falkland.
