= Sara Mackmin =

British Royal Air Force officer

Group Captain Sara Mackmin CBE

Commander, RAF Search and Rescue Force
- In office 2013–?

Commanding Officer, No. 202 Squadron RAF
- In office 2008–?

Personal details
- Born: c. 1969

Group Captain Sara Bridget Mackmin CBE (born c. 1969) is a British Royal Air Force officer. Appointed commander of the RAF Search and Rescue Force in 2013, she was the first female aircrew officer in British military history to be promoted to group captain (or equivalent) rank and the first to command a flying unit above squadron level.

Having graduated with a Bachelor of Engineering (BEng) degree, Mackmin received a short service commission in the Women's Royal Air Force as a pilot officer in the General Duties Branch (i.e. aircrew) on 17 February 1991. As a graduate, on 17 September 1991 she was promoted flying officer with seniority from 17 February 1990. She was promoted flight lieutenant on 17 August 1993. The WRAF fully assimilated into the RAF in 1994 and Mackmin (or Slingsby as she then was) converted to a permanent commission on 22 August 1996.

She qualified as a helicopter pilot in 1994 and flew Puma helicopters in the Bosnian War in 1995 and in Northern Ireland in 1997. She then qualified as the first female helicopter instructor in the British Armed Forces in 1998. She was promoted squadron leader on 1 July 2000 and later that year became the first female commander of a flying unit. On 1 July 2006, she was promoted wing commander, and in 2008 took command of No. 202 Squadron RAF, flying Westland Sea King helicopters in the search and rescue role.

Mackmin has also served three tours as a staff officer at the Ministry of Defence, most recently, before her promotion to group captain in 2013, as personal staff officer to the Assistant Chief of the Air Staff. She also volunteers with the RAF Mountain Rescue Service at RAF Valley, where she is based, and competes in equestrian events.

Mackmin was appointed Commander of the Order of the British Empire (CBE) in the 2023 Birthday Honours.

== See also ==
- Nicky Smith, the RAF's first female helicopter pilot and flying squadron commander
