= Kelly's Garden =

Coordinates: 51°35′05″S 59°01′57″W

Royal Air Force Kelly's Garden
- Active: 1982–1986
- Country: Falkland Islands
- Branch: Royal Air Force
- Role: Tactical transport/support
- Part of: British Forces Falkland Islands (BFFI)
- Engagements: Falkland Islands conflict

Kelly's Garden was a site used by the Royal Air Force in the Falkland Islands. Situated near to Port San Carlos, on the North-West Coast of East Falkland. The site is close to where the British Task Force landed to retake the Falkland Islands from the invading Argentine Forces on 21 May 1982.

Following the Falklands War, Chinook helicopters from No. 7 Squadron RAF and No. 18 Squadron RAF flew from Kelly's Garden as 'ChinDet Falkland Islands', later renamed as No. 1310 (Tactical Support) Flight RAF (1310 Flt). Later 1310 Flt was amalgamated with No. 1564 Flight RAF (1564 Flt) to form No. 78 Squadron RAF (78 Sqn) at RAF Mount Pleasant, moving from Kelly's Garden, RAF Navy Point and RAF Stanley.

Air defence of Port San Carlos and Kelly's Garden was provided by 30 Battery (Rogers's Company) a Royal Artillery detachment of Rapier surface-to-air missiles.

The origin of the name Kelly's Garden is not known, but may have been named by Irish Guards resident at the site.

== See also ==
- List of Royal Air Force aircraft independent flights
- List of Royal Air Force aircraft squadrons
- Military of the Falkland Islands
