= Nicky Smith (RAF officer) =

British Royal Air Force officer

Squadron Leader Nicky Smith

Commanding officer, No. 84 Squadron RAF
- In office March 2002 – September 2004

Personal details
- Born: Nicola Elizabeth Smith Colchester, Essex, England

Squadron Leader Nicola Elizabeth Smith is a retired British Royal Air Force officer. She was the first female military helicopter pilot in the United Kingdom and in 2002 she became the first female to command a flying squadron.

== Early life ==
Smith was born in Colchester. She lived at Merlin Way in Whittington near Lichfield. Her father was Major John Smith, who was in the Royal Army Educational Corps, in Germany. Her mother was Rosemary, with sister Amanda. She attended King Edward VI School, Lichfield, where she was head girl, at the same time as the actress Helen Baxendale. In November 1985 she was picked to play hockey for the Staffordshire Under 18 team, where she played in goal. Her sister also played hockey. In 1986 she gained A-levels in Maths, Further Maths, Physics and Geography.

She studied aeronautical engineering at Emmanuel College, Cambridge, where she joined Cambridge University Air Squadron in 1986. Regraded from acting pilot officer to pilot officer on 15 July 1989, she passed out from the RAF College Cranwell in 1990 with the Sash of Merit as best female cadet.

== Career ==
=== Royal Air Force ===
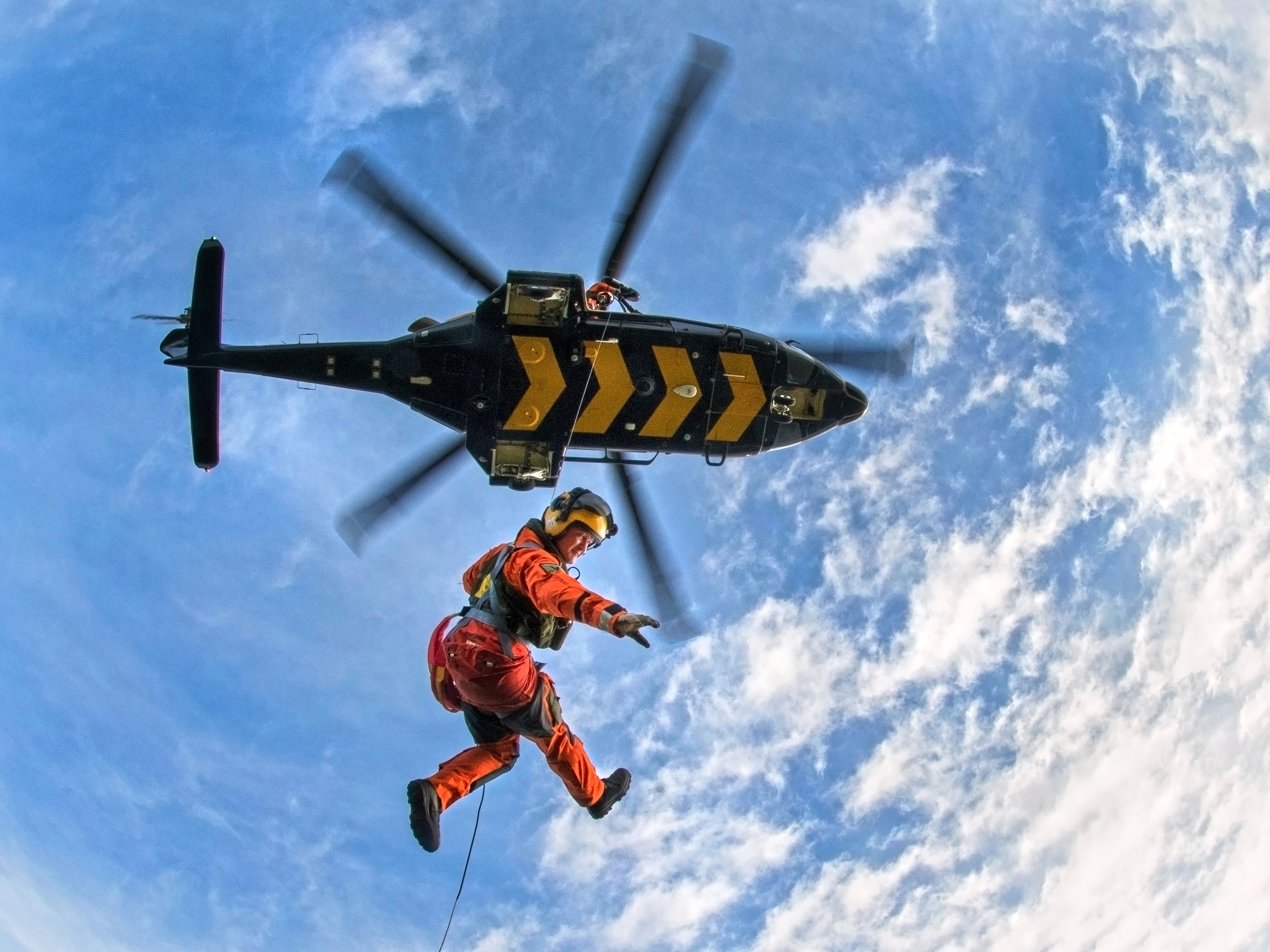
Search and Rescue training at RAF Shawbury in October 2016

She was promoted flying officer on 15 January 1990 and in November 1990 she transferred from the Engineer Branch to the General Duties Branch as aircrew, becoming one of the first female trainee pilots in the RAF. She was promoted flight lieutenant on 15 January 1992. She went to RAF Swinderby for elementary flying training, returned to Cranwell for basic flying training, and then went to RAF Shawbury, where she became the first woman in the British military to qualify as a helicopter pilot in October 1992.

She became a search and rescue pilot, flying Westland Sea Kings, initially with 202 Squadron at RAF Boulmer in Northumberland, then with the same squadron at RAF Lossiemouth in Scotland, and later with 22 Squadron at RAF Valley on Anglesey, flying more than 250 missions.

She was promoted squadron leader in 1999 and, after a staff tour as the personal staff officer to the air officer commanding and commandant of the RAF College Cranwell, she trained on Westland Wessex helicopters with 72 Squadron at RAF Aldergrove in Northern Ireland before being posted to RAF Akrotiri in Cyprus to take command of 84 Squadron in March 2002.

=== Later career ===
She retired from the RAF in September 2006, although keeping her ties with the service by joining the Royal Air Force Volunteer Reserve (Training Branch) as a flying officer, and taught mathematics at Felsted School until September 2007, when she joined CHC Helicopter as business development manager and Soteria Search and Rescue as transition manager. In April 2011, she joined Essex and Hertfordshire Air Ambulance as an air ambulance pilot. In November 2014, Captain Smith moved to Wiltshire Air Ambulance. She is currently Director Aviation at the Confidential Human Factors Incident Reporting Programme (CHIRP).

== Personal life ==
While at RAF Boulmer, she married Flight Lieutenant Peter Cantwell, a Tucano instructor at RAF Cranwell, from Redcar, at St Giles church in Whittington, on 14 August 1993.

== See also ==
- Sara Mackmin, the RAF's first female commander of a flying unit above squadron size
