= No. 1310 Flight RAF =

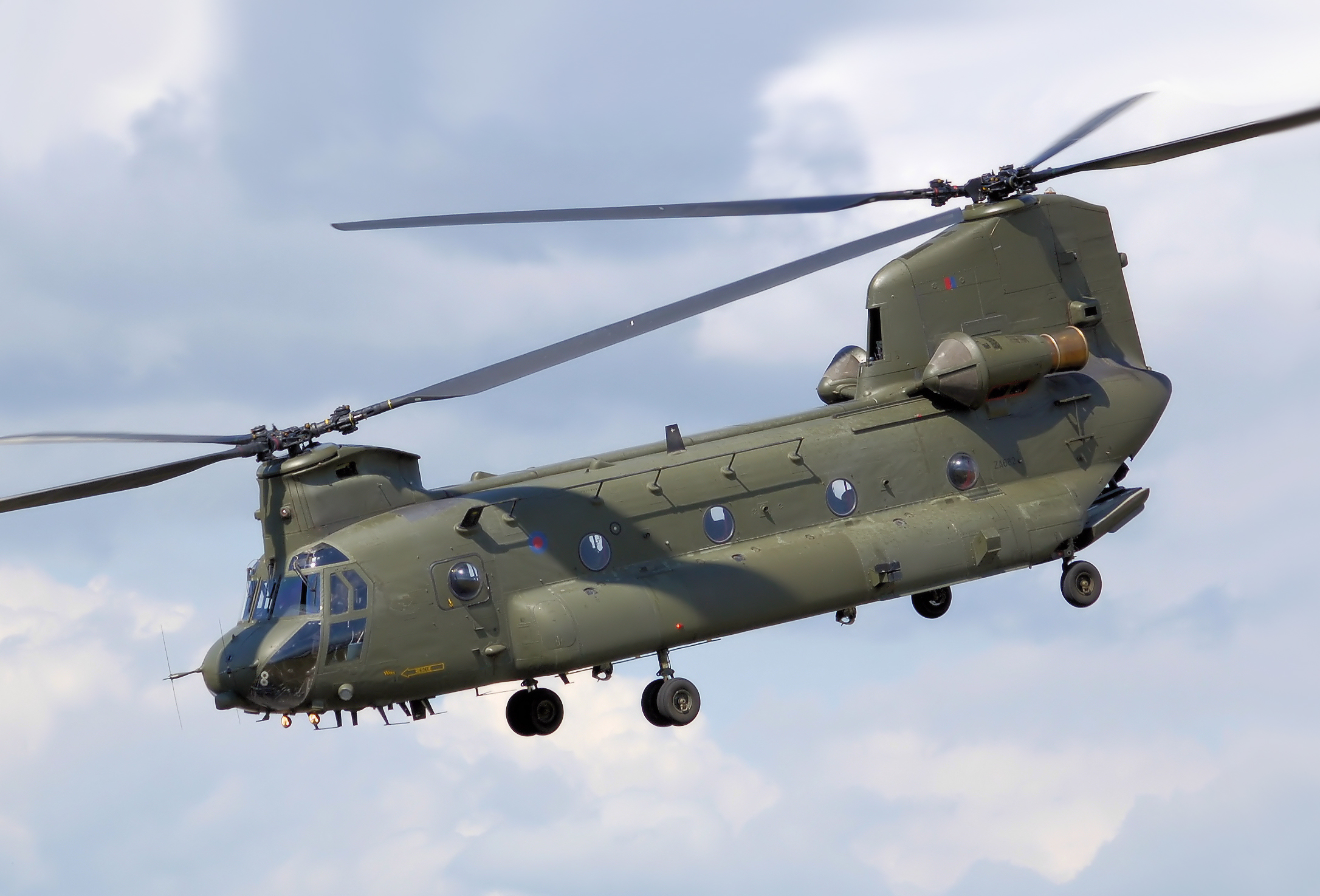
- Active: 10 Apr 1944 – 21 Jul 1944; 31 Mar 1953 – 7 Dec 1953; 23 Jul 1964 – 14 Oct 1966; 20 Aug 1983 – 1 May 1986; Dec 1995 – ? (Bosnia) ? – Apr 2005 (Basra) ? – Nov 2014 (Kandahar); Nov 2014 – Mar 2015 (Kabul); 2016 (RAF Mount Pleasant); 2018 – 2022 (Mali); Apr 2025 - present (RAF Akrotiri)
- Role: Transport
- Garrison/HQ: RAF Llandow; RAF Bognor; RAF Lyneham; RAAF Base Mallala; RAF Odiham; Atkinson Field, British Guyana; RAF Fairford; RAF Kelly's Garden, Falkland Islands; RAF Mount Pleasant; Divulje Barracks, Split, Croatia; Basrah Airport; Kandahar Airfield; Kabul International Airport; Gao International Airport; RAF Akrotiri
- Equipment: Avro Anson I & X Avro York C.1; Westland Whirlwind HAR.4 & HAR.10; Scottish Aviation Twin Pioneer CC.2; Boeing Chinook HC1, 2, 4, 5, & 6a

No. 1310 Flight RAF is a flight of the Royal Air Force.

== History ==
No. 1310 (Transport) Flight was first formed at RAF Llandow on 10 April 1944, equipped with Avro Anson I transport aircraft. The flight was disbanded on 21 July 1944 at RAF Bognor, absorbed by 83 Group Support Wing.

1310 Flight was re-formed at RAF Lyneham with Avro York transport aircraft to provide transport services for the early nuclear weapon tests in Western Australia, disbanding at RAAF Base Mallala on 7 December 1953.

The next incarnation of 1310 Flight was at RAF Odiham, where the Flight prepared to transfer to British Guiana, in South America, to assist the nascent government of the newly independent state. Its first role with helicopters flying Westland Whirlwind HAR 10s, with three helicopters, three pilots and approximately thirty ground crew, then deployed to Atkinson Field. This mission was carried out alongside five Alouette II helicopters of 24 Flight Army Air Corps, in joint support of the British Army for two years before its helicopters were flown back to RAF Fairford with the Flight disbanding on 14 October 1966.

Following the Falklands War, the Flight was reformed at Kelly's Garden near to Port San Carlos, as 'ChinDet Falkland Islands', flying Boeing Chinook helicopters from Nos. 7 and 18 Squadrons, renamed as No. 1310 (Tactical Support) Flight RAF. Later 1310 Flt was amalgamated with 1564 Flt to form 78 Sqn at RAF Mount Pleasant.

1310 Flt was re-formed again at Divulje Barracks, Split in Croatia in December 1995 for service in Bosnia, flying support for British units in the Implementation Force (IFOR) and Stabilisation Force (SFOR) until relieved by Chinooks of 298 Squadron RNLAF in December 2000.

It was again formed in southern Iraq to provide helicopter support to the British-commanded division based in the area and operated from a Main Operating Base at Basra Airport, and from a Forward Operating Base in Al Amarah on Operation Telic. It was stood down in April 2005 and replaced by 1419 Flt.

From 2005 to 2006, 1310 Flight operated Chinooks in Afghanistan's Helmand Province for Operation Herrick and Kandahar Province supporting the International Security Assistance Force (ISAF) on Operation Toral. The Chinook's role in Afghanistan included air assault, forward operating base resupply, and casualty evacuation.

The flight had eight Chinooks under its control. In November 2014 five of these were returned to the United Kingdom and the three remaining were moved to Kabul to support the personnel training the Afghan Armed Forces.

Three Chinooks were based in Kabul until March 2015 and were replaced by Puma HC.2s.

From 2016-late 2017, 1310 Flight consisted of two Chinook HC.4s based in the Falkland Islands.

In 2018, three Chinooks and up to 100 support personnel were deployed to Mali in support of Operation Newcombe.

The operation ended in November 2022 and all British Armed Forces personnel withdrew from Mali.

After the retirement of the RAF Puma HC.2s of 84 Squadron, a Chinook detachment of three aircraft was stood up at RAF Akrotiri to fulfill the sovereign base area treaty requirements to maintain an aerial firefighting capability.

In July 2025, 1310 Flight supported Cypriot efforts to contain the Island's largest wildfires since 1974 over an intense two day period.

== See also ==
- RAF Mount Pleasant
