= Royal Air Force Mountain Rescue Service =

UK military rescue team

RAF Mountain Rescue Service
- badge of the RAF Mountain Rescue Service
- Active: 1943 – present
- Country: United Kingdom
- Branch: Royal Air Force
- Type: Search and rescue organisation
- Role: Mountain rescue
- Size: Headquarters and three teams
- Part of: No. 85 Expeditionary Logistics Wing
- Home stations: RAF Valley (HQ); RAF Leeming; RAF Lossiemouth
- Motto: Whensoever

The Royal Air Force Mountain Rescue Service (RAFMRS) provides the United Kingdom military's only all-weather search and rescue asset for the United Kingdom. Royal Air Force (RAF) mountain rescue teams (MRTs) were first organised during World War II to rescue aircrew from the large number of military aircraft crashes then occurring due to navigational errors in conjunction with bad weather and resulting poor visibility when flying in the vicinity of high ground. The practice at the time was to organise ad-hoc rescue parties from station medical sections and other ground personnel.

Experience demonstrated that this could be dangerous. While the mountains of the United Kingdom are not very tall, they contain much formerly glaciated terrain with steep cliffs, talus slopes, high peaks, and cirque basins; and generally experience a sub-Arctic climate at relatively low altitudes. Snow and high winds, sometimes in excess of 100 miles per hour (161 kilometres per hour), are possible any month of the year. Rescue operations in these conditions require personnel with specialised mountaineering training and equipment.

The Royal Air Force mountain rescue teams are credited with some of the earliest development of mountain rescue techniques and teams in the United Kingdom and overseas. RAFMRS teams continue to contribute to life-saving and mountain safety. Since the closure of military search and rescue (helicopter), RAFMRS moved from 2 Group to the newly reformed 38 Group in 2015 until its disbandment in 2020, and has now direct oversight by No. 85 (Expeditionary Logistics) Wing RAF.

== History ==
=== Foundation ===
Royal Air Force policy from the very early days of 1918 was for the station medical officer to attend all aircraft crashes as, initially at least, the low air speeds meant that many crashes were survivable, and first aid would be given before the crews were moved either into station sick quarters or a hospital. A single RAF medical officer, Flight Lieutenant George Desmond Graham (also known as 'Doc' Graham), is credited with pressuring the Air Ministry into forming the RAF Mountain Rescue Service (MRS). Graham was one of several RAF medical doctors who organised teams at RAF Llandwrog in North Wales in 1943, at RAF Millom (southern Lake District), and at RAF Harpur Hill (Peak District), where Flt Lt (later Air Commodore) Dr David Crichton performed a similar role. Graham's team rescued dozens of allied airmen from Snowdonia, before Graham was posted to Burma, where he took part in an early para-rescue operation (strikingly similar to one generally credited as the beginning of United States Air Force Pararescue), saving the life of a Royal Canadian Air Force navigator, Flying Officer W Prosser.

Shortly after the war, the fledgling service was reorganised and retrained along professional grounds, through an influx of trained mountaineers, including Sgt Hans Pick, a former Austrian Army Alpine instructor, and Sergeant J.R. 'Johnny' Lees, whose involvement with the service is recounted by author and mountain guide Gwen Moffat in her 1964 book about the early days of the service. Other notable early team leaders include Squadron Leader David Dattner OBE, AFC, Flt Sgt J.R. Lees GM, BEM, Corporal Colin Pibworth BEM, and Chief Technician John Hinde BEM.

=== Early years ===
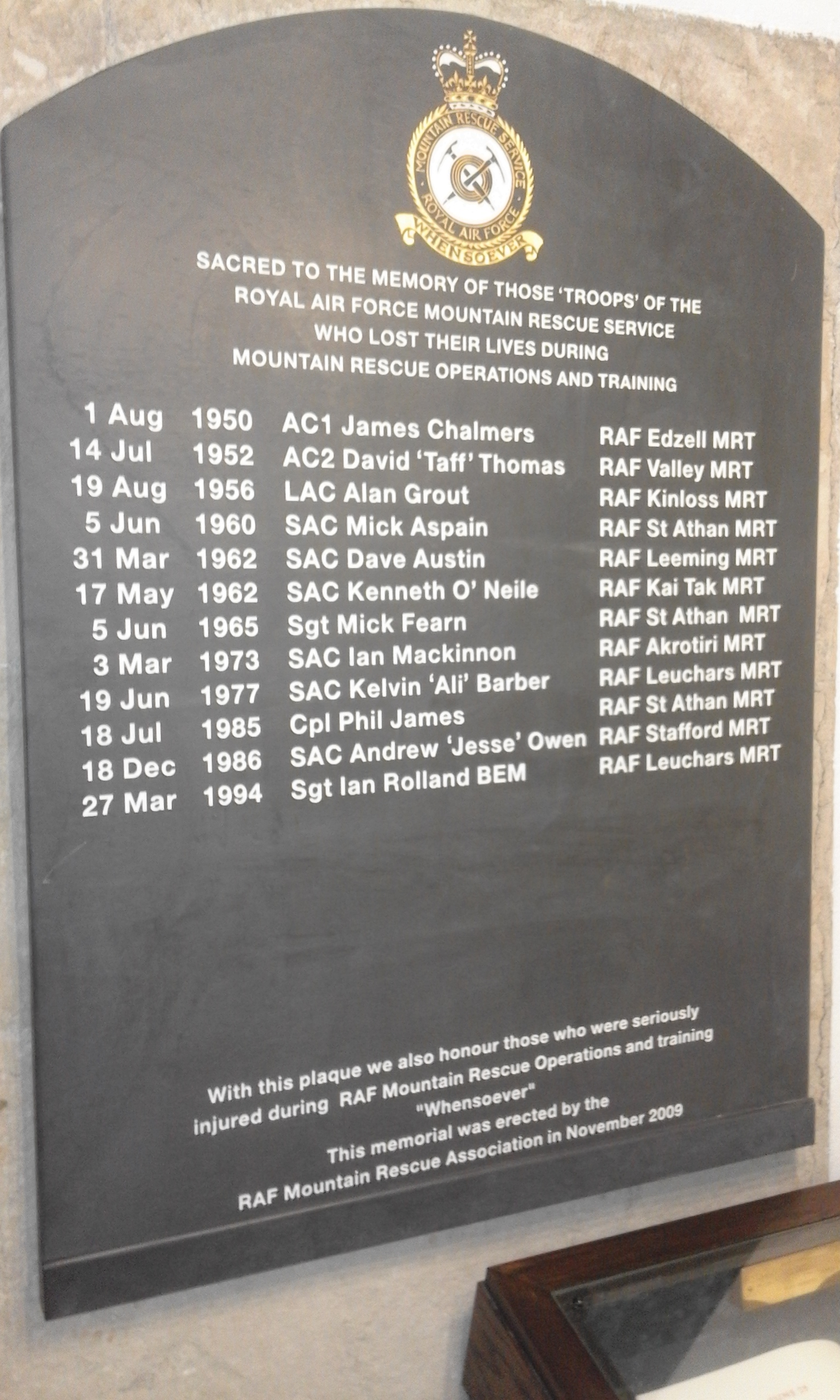
Royal Air Force Mountain Rescue Team memorial plaque in St Clement Danes church crypt, London.

A mountain rescue operation is known as a 'call-out'. Particularly noteworthy call-outs include the extended search for the remains of the crew of Avro Lancaster registration TX264 of No. 120 Squadron RAF, which crashed into Scotland's 1,010-metre (3,314 ft) Beinn Eighe on 14 March 1951. Recovering all the remains took several months, and led to public criticism of the fledgling service from mountaineering groups, which helped prod the RAF to provide specialised personnel, better training, and proper equipment. Less than a year later, an Aer Lingus Douglas DC-3 crashed into a mountain near Porthmadog in Snowdonia with 23 people on board, and RAFMRS personnel recovered the remains.

Over the 1950s, the service became more professional and better coordinated with civilian authorities. Many noteworthy civilian volunteer mountain rescue teams in the UK began as RAFMRS 'sub-units'. Two air crashes high in the mountains of Turkey during the 1950s provided call-outs for the first of several overseas teams of the RAFMRS, based at RAF Nicosia in Cyprus. Both crashes had a sense of Cold War espionage, involving secret nuclear papers and equipment. To this day, the service's historians feel they lack all the details. Other overseas teams were based in Aden, Sharjah, Sultanate of Oman, and Hong Kong. The Middle Eastern teams were characterised as 'desert rescue', and British Army personnel were occasionally involved.

The RAF allowed female RAFMRS team members for the first time in 1994, when the then Inspector of Land Rescue, Squadron Leader Brian Canfer, tired of having to rationalise excluding women to a UK parliamentary all-party group, agreed to a trial of female volunteers. Advice from the Dutch fire service at the time was that they be accepted, but on equal terms regarding physical fitness and mountaineering requirements.

Since their formation, the teams have rescued thousands of civilian walkers and climbers, and responded to hundreds of aircraft crashes. Perhaps the most famous call-out of all was for the crash of Pan Am Flight 103 over Lockerbie, Scotland in 1988, also known as the Lockerbie Air Disaster. This terrorist incident resulted in the scattering of human remains over a wide swath of southern Scotland. The call-out involved four of the six teams then in existence, and "stretched the personnel involved to the limits". Psychological effects on RAF MR troops that took part in the call-out were described in 'Trauma' by Professor Gordon Turnbull, who was an RAF psychiatrist with personal knowledge of RAF MR.

=== Recent history ===
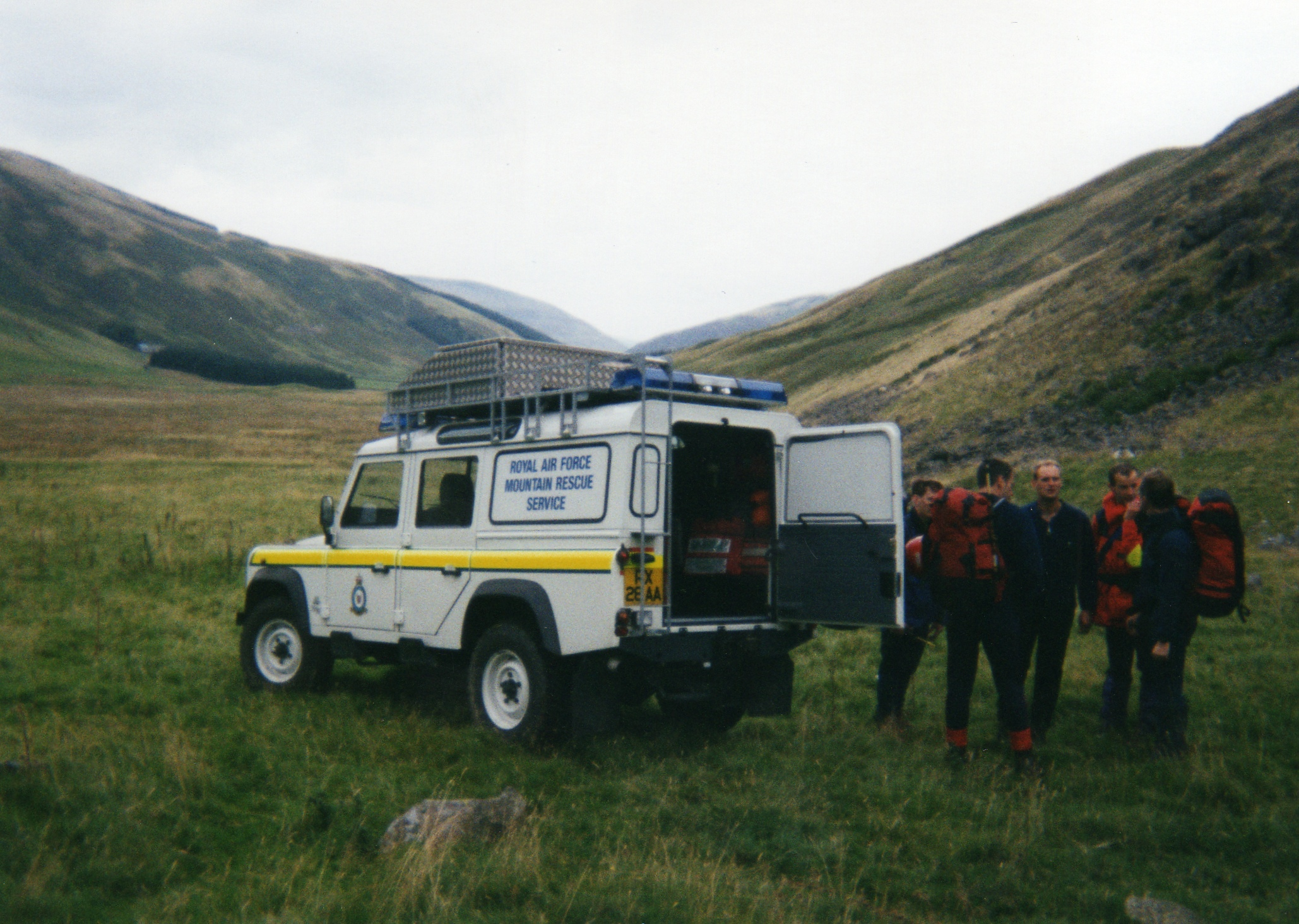
Members of the former RAF Leuchars Mountain Rescue Team at the foot of Bitch Craig in the Scottish Borders

Helicopter operations, frequently used in mountain rescue, were until recently conducted in cooperation with No. 202 Squadron RAF and No. 22 Squadron RAF. These two squadrons, with the three remaining MRTs and headquarters, and the Rescue Coordination Centre at the former RAF Kinloss, comprised RAF Search and Rescue. In 2015, the helicopter squadrons were disbanded, and their search and rescue role assigned to the Bristow Group, a private corporation. Prince William, Duke of Cambridge, spent two weeks working with RAF Mountain Rescue in 2005, and Buckingham Palace cites this as background to his later decision to become the patron of Mountain Rescue England and Wales.

== Training ==
All RAF MRT members are volunteers. RAFMRS team members are known as 'M.R. Troops' or just 'Troops'. Traditionally, team membership is reserved for enlisted men and women; although officers may serve as either Mountain Rescue Team liaison Officers (MRTLO) or as a Troop, NB this is not at all the same thing as being the team leader but simply a mechanism linking the Team to the station's executives. The position of Team Leader is reserved for a senior non-commissioned officer (SNCO), generally a seasoned veteran. For some, service on a team is a primary duty, and they are known as the Permanent Staff or PS. For others, it is a part-time activity in addition to their normal RAF trade or branch for which they are granted relief from other normal secondary duties, such as guard duty.

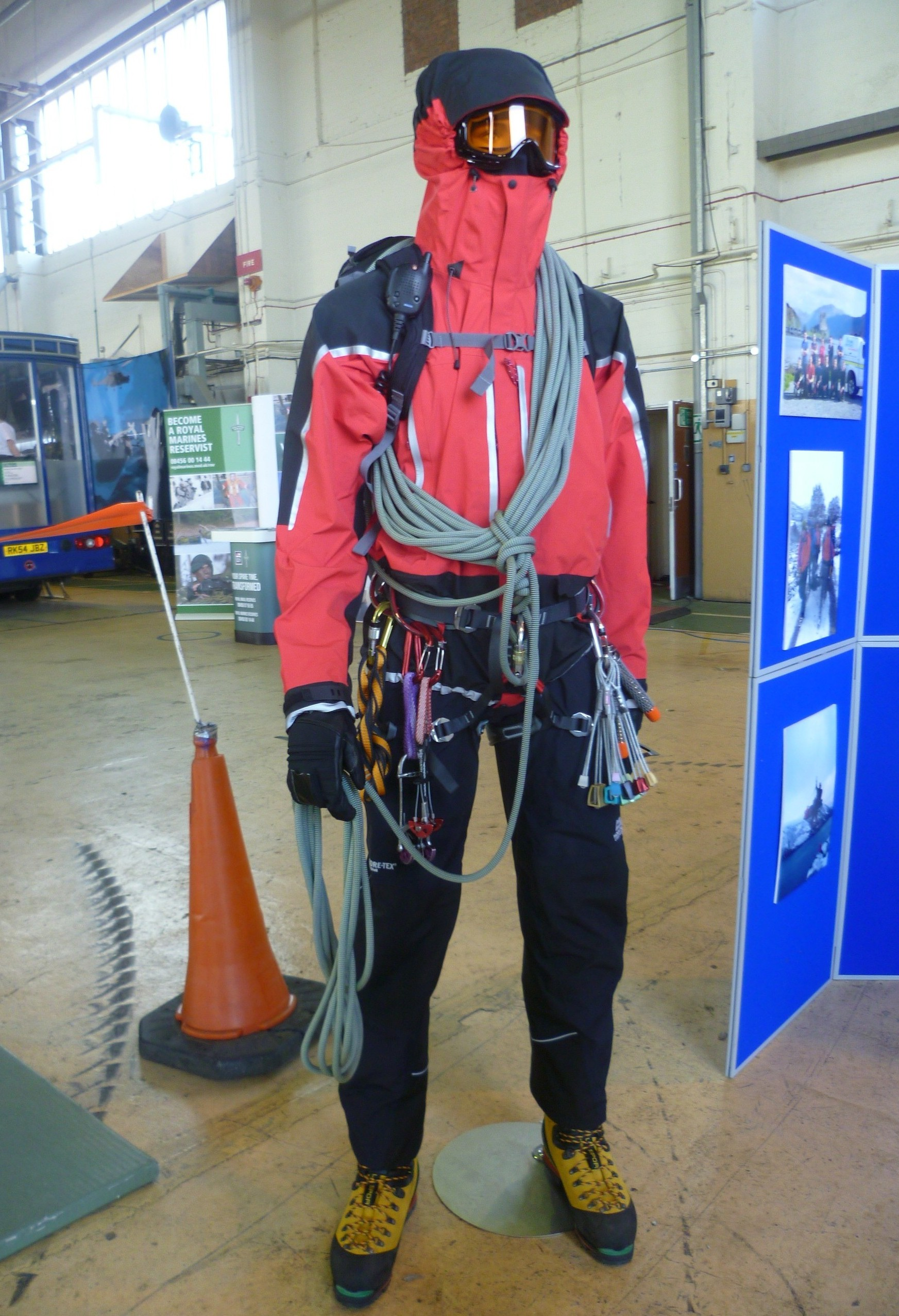
RAF mountain rescue equipment displayed at the Leuchars Airshow, 2012

Most training is done 'on the hill', the term for mountaineering training days. The MRS has a training syllabus that must be completed by each 'Troop'. New troops are considered 'novices'. After personnel have completed the first part of the syllabus, they sit a practical and theory test to become 'part trained', and this permits the wearing of the mountain rescue badge on the right fore-sleeve of dress uniform and the RAF blue jumper, one of only two special service badges recognised for RAF enlisted personnel, the other being the badge of a qualified marksman. Walking, mountain navigation, high-angle rescue techniques, rock climbing, and winter mountaineering are the primary training activities, which are carried out in all weathers. After the 'part trained' section 'troops' then complete 'Trained' and 'Party Leader' status, both having theory and practical tests. Alongside these core elements, RAF MRS also have 'Intermediate and Immediate Emergency Care Provider' (IEC), 'Rock Leader', 'Rock Instructor', 'Winter Leader', and 'Winter Instructor'.

A regular 'Troop' is expected to spend upwards of 30 weekends a year training on the hill. Many Himalayan expeditions have been mounted, and troops and ex-troops have participated in other organisations' expeditions. In 1970, ex RAF Kinloss troop Ian Clough died when a serac collapsed on him while descending Annapurna on an expedition with Chris Bonington. Other sites for expeditions have included Alaska's Denali, the first RAF single service Everest expedition when Chief Technician ‘Dan’ Carroll and Corporal ‘Rusty’ Bale complete an ascent of Mount Everest in 2001, and also Antarctica, where troops have volunteered for British Antarctic Survey duties.

Each year, the service runs several courses to ensure that personnel are sufficiently qualified, and bring forward new 'Troops'. These courses include Summer and Winter mountaineering courses where the focus is on training lead climbers, Technical Rescue courses focusing on new techniques, and a Party Leader course. A special course is held when needed every few years to train team leaders.

== Structure ==
The RAF Mountain Rescue Service comprises three teams, based at RAF Valley in North Wales, RAF Leeming in England, and RAF Lossiemouth in Scotland. A headquarters is based at RAF Valley which provides administration, training, and equipment support.

The service reports to No. 85 Expeditionary Logistics Wing, based at RAF Wittering in Cambridgeshire.

== Awards and decorations ==
The following major UK Forces decorations have been awarded to past and serving members of the RAFMRS:

George Medal

- Flight Sergeant J R Lees (Amphitheatre Buttress rescue, 1958)

Officer of the Order of the British Empire

- Acting Squadron Leader David Dattner (1954)

Member of the Order of the British Empire

- Flight Lieutenant GD Graham (services to mountain rescue, 1943)
- Flight Lieutenant D Crichton (services to mountain rescue, 1946)
- Flight Lieutenant R Robertson (Mount Suphan (Turkey) call-out, 1959)
- Squadron Leader J Sims, (services to mountain rescue, 1967)
- Squadron Leader G Blackburn (services to mountain rescue, 1984)
- Squadron Leader W Gault, (Lockerbie Air Disaster, 1989)
- Warrant Officer R Sefton (services to mountain rescue, 1993)
- Sergeant P Duckworth (services to mountain rescue, 1995)
- Flight Sergeant W Batson (services to mountain rescue, 1996)
- Sergeant A Sylvester (services to mountain rescue, 1998)
- Sergeant C Van der Lee (services to mountain rescue, 1998)
- Corporal W J McRitchie (services to mountain rescue, 1999)
- Flight Lieutenant N Daniel (services to mountain rescue, 2001)
- Flight Sergeant J A F Coull (services to mountain rescue, 2001)
- Flight Sergeant D Whalley (services to mountain rescue, 2002)
- Flight Sergeant M Carroll (services to mountain rescue, 2003)
- Warrant Officer A B Haveron (services to mountain rescue, 2003)
- Squadron Leader N Barr (services to mountain rescue, 2002)
- Squadron Leader Simon Moore (Services to RAF mountain rescue 2003)

Queen's Commendation for Bravery

- Senior Aircraftman G Hercod (Mount Suphan (Turkey) call-out, 1959)
- Flight Sergeant G Bruce (call out for missing school party in Cairngorms, 1971)
- Sergeant W Batson (Lockerbie Air Disaster, 1989)
- Sergeant P Winn, (Lockerbie Air Disaster, 1989)
- Flight Sergeant D Whalley (Lockerbie Air Disaster, 1989)

British Empire Medal

- Corporal G McTigue (services to mountain rescue, 1943)
- Flight Sergeant D E Siddons (services to mountain rescue, 1950)
- Senior Aircraftman M Brown (Beinn Eighe call-out, 1952)
- Corporal C D Austin (services to mountain rescue, 1952)
- Sergeant J Mooring (services to mountain rescue, 1958)
- Flight Sergeant H Appleby (Mount Suphan (Turkey) call-out, 1959)
- Sergeant J Emmerson (Mount Suphan (Turkey) call-out, 1959)
- Senior Aircraftsman G Murphy (Mount Suphan (Turkey) call-out, 1959)
- Sergeant J Steed, (services to mountain rescue, 1960)
- Flight Sergeant JR Lees (services to mountain rescue, 1962)
- Flight Sergeant W Brankin (services to mountain rescue, 1963)
- Sergeant G Patterson (Wadi Mukeiras call-out, 1959)
- Chief Technician J Hinde (services to mountain rescue, 1964)
- Chief Technician G R Palin (services to mountain rescue, 1968)
- Sergeant P McGowan (services to mountain rescue, 1971)
- Corporal C Pibworth (services to mountain rescue and desert rescue, 1972)
- Flight Sergeant J Tunnah (services to mountain rescue, 1972)
- Flight Sergeant G Bruce (services to mountain rescue and Elephant Island Expedition, 1973)
- Flight Sergeant H Oldham (services to mountain rescue, 1976)
- Flight Sergeant R Sefton (services to mountain rescue, 1977)
- Flight Sergeant J Baines (services to mountain rescue, 1979)
- Chief Technician J Craig (services to mountain rescue, 1979)
- Flight Sergeant A Haveron (services to mountain rescue, 1984)
- Flight Sergeant D Shanks (services to mountain rescue, 1986)
- Flight Sergeant K Taylor (services to mountain rescue, 1987)
- Flight Sergeant P Weatherill (services to mountain rescue, 1987)
- Flight Sergeant D Whalley (services to mountain rescue, 1992)
- Flight Sergeant P Kirkpatrick (services to mountain rescue, 1993)
