= Russell Aitken (RAF officer) =

Royal Air Force officer

Russell Faulkner Aitken
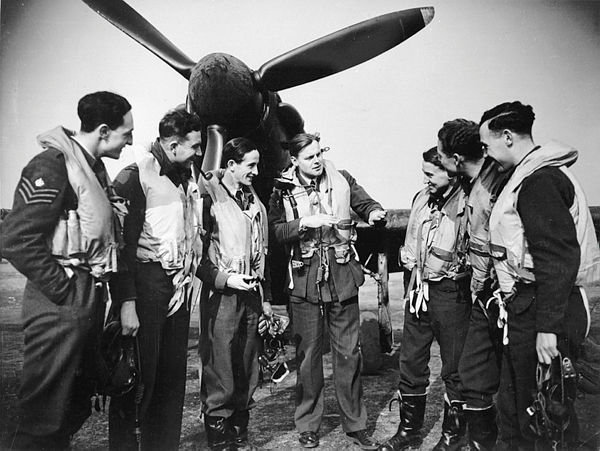
- Aitken (centre) discusses aerial combat with a group of pilots of No. 3 Squadron, 1941
- Born: 15 September 1913; Outram, New Zealand
- Died: 25 February 1989 (aged 75); Kenepuru Hospital, Wellington, New Zealand
- Burial place: Porirua Cemetery, Wellington, New Zealand
- Military career
- Allegiance: New Zealand
- Branch: Royal Air Force (1937–1957)
- Rank: Group Captain
- Nickname: Digger
- Commands: RAF Bradwell Bay; RAF Hawkinge; No. 3 Squadron
- Conflicts: Second World War; Norwegian campaign; Battle of Britain; The Blitz; Baedeker Blitz
- Awards: Commander of the Order of the British Empire; Air Force Cross; Mention in despatches (three)

Group Captain Russell Faulkner Aitken CBE, AFC (15 September 1913 – 25 February 1989) was a New Zealand officer who served in the Royal Air Force (RAF) during the Second World War. He pioneered the use of amphibious aircraft for rescuing RAF pilots who had been shot down over the English Channel and the North Sea.

Born in Outram, in New Zealand, Aitken joined the RAF in 1937. He was initially posted to the Fleet Air Arm as an instructor, but also helped with development of weaponry and the introduction into service of the Blackburn Skua dive bomber/fighter. After briefly being involved in the Norwegian campaign, he was serving at RAF Gosport when he began using a Supermarine Walrus, an amphibian aircraft, to rescue pilots who bailed out or ditched into the English Channel during the Battle of Britain. He later commanded a night fighter squadron and organised intruder missions into occupied France. In September 1942, he was appointed commander at RAF Hawkinge, the youngest man in the RAF to be in charge of a station. He later commanded the RAF station at Bradwell Bay. By the end of the war, he had been made an officer in the Order of the British Empire, awarded the Air Force Cross, and mentioned in despatches three times. He continued to serve in the RAF during the postwar period, retiring in 1961. He spent his later years in New Zealand, where he died at the age of 75.

== Early life ==
Russell Faulkner Aitken was born in Outram, in Otago, New Zealand on 15 September 1913. His family were farmers in the area. Excelling at athletics, particularly sprinting, in his youth, he was educated at Gore High School before going onto Timaru Boys' High School. After completing his schooling, he worked on his family's farm. In 1937, he went to England, having applied for a short service commission in the Royal Air Force (RAF). He had received some flight training at Taieri Aerodrome before he left New Zealand.

After gaining his commission as an acting pilot officer in the RAF on 5 July, Aitken, who was nicknamed Digger, was posted to Coastal Command, but was then loaned to the Fleet Air Arm as a flying instructor. His acting rank confirmed in May the following year, his instructing work was in relation to the launching of aircraft from catapults. He was also engaged in experimental work, helping to develop radio-controlled aircraft and torpedoes, and was involved in the introduction of the Blackburn Skua, a carrier-based dive bomber/fighter, into Fleet Air Arm service. He was the first man to fly such an aircraft off a catapult launch.

In mid-1939, the New Zealand Government arranged for the purchase of 30 Vickers Wellington bombers for the Royal New Zealand Air Force. Aitken was selected to ferry one of the Wellingtons to New Zealand, but following the outbreak of the Second World War, the bombers were placed at the disposal of the RAF and he resumed service with the Fleet Air Arm.

== Second World War ==
Promoted to flying officer in November 1939, Aitken remained on instructional duties into mid-1940, interspersed with periods of duty aboard a series of aircraft carriers, beginning with HMS Courageous and then HMS Furious. He later served on HMS Ark Royal and on one voyage in February 1940, he was swept into the sea when the ship was taking evasive action during a bombing attack mounted by the Luftwaffe. The only man lost overboard in the incident, he was picked up by a following destroyer. During the campaign in Norway, Aitken flew a Hawker Hurricane fighter off Ark Royal to Trondheim.

=== Battle of Britain ===
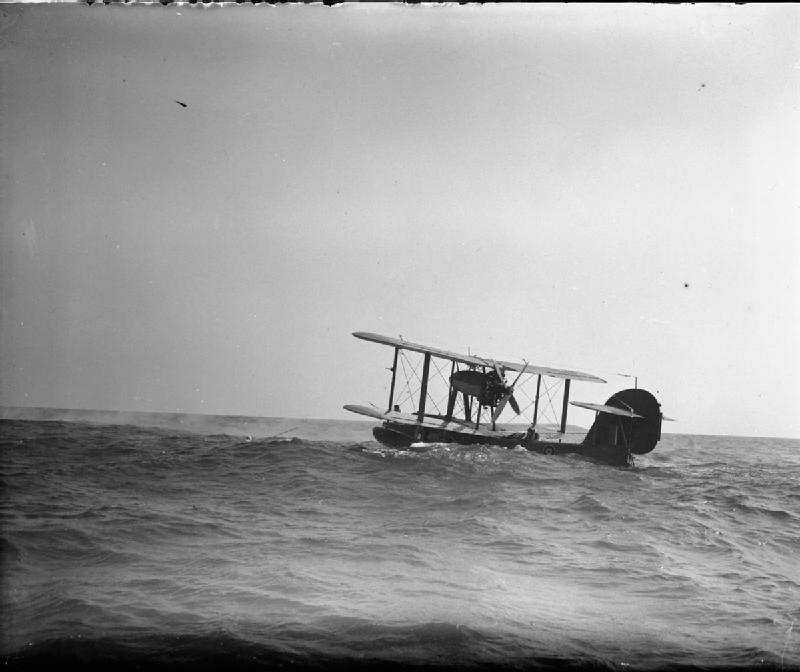
A Supermarine Walrus taxiing on the sea

In the early stages of the Battle of Britain, many British fighter pilots who bailed over the English Channel or North Sea drowned or died of exposure before being rescued by lifeboats or launches, if they were located at all. This was a significant concern for the RAF at a time when trained and experienced fighter pilots were vital to Britain's aerial defences. In July, Aitken was stationed at Gosport and observed many aerial engagements over Portsmouth and Southampton that saw aircraft being ditched in the sea. He proposed to his commander that amphibious aircraft be used in a rescue service for downed pilots as a quicker alternative to the launches that he often saw making their way to the downed pilots.

With his initiative approved, Aitken sourced a Supermarine Walrus, a biplane amphibian having a crew of four and which had been in service with the RAF since 1933. He then stationed himself off the Isle of Wight, on the south coast of England. Floating on the sea, he would wait for the dogfights to take place above him before taking off to retrieve any pilots who had ditched or bailed out. He was soon joined by a couple of other pilots, similarly operating Walruses but from the Royal Navy Air Station at Ford. These semi-official air-sea rescue services ended at the end of August, when Gosport and Ford were bombed. By this time, Aitken had been responsible for rescuing at least 35 pilots, both British and German. His work helped lead to the development of the Air Sea Rescue Services which operated air-sea rescue squadrons for collecting RAF aircrew who had ditched in the sea.

=== Later war service ===
In September 1940, Aitken was posted to Fighter Command, joining No. 3 Squadron, which operated Hurricanes and was tasked with patrolling over Scapa Flow, protecting the Royal Navy ships there from attack by the Luftwaffe. Promoted to flight lieutenant within two months of his arrival, he was appointed the squadron's commander in April 1941. At this time it was stationed near London and tasked with the aerial defence of the city. The squadron began flying night fighter missions, targeting German bombers during the Blitz. On 10 May, during one particularly heavy raid on London, Aitken shot down a Junkers Ju 88 medium bomber, one of around 30 bombers destroyed that evening.

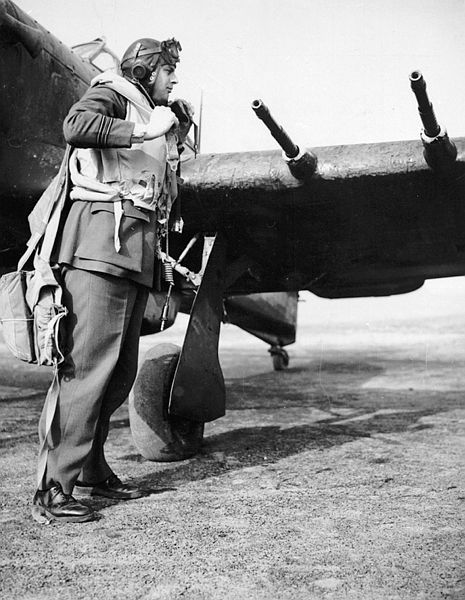
Aikten standing beside a Hawker Hurricane in his flying kit

The squadron was engaged in attacking German shipping passing through the English Channel, sinking a number of vessels. Aitken then began organising intruder missions into occupied France, his Hurricanes targeting German bombers as they returned from raids on Britain. They accounted for at least 15 enemy aircraft destroyed. He remained in command of the squadron, now operating from Hunsdon, until April 1942 at which time he was appointed to the headquarters of No. 11 Group, Fighter Command.

In his new post, Aitken was tasked with helping with the organisation of London's nighttime defences. This was a particularly demanding role, as at the time the Luftwaffe had stepped up its bombing raids, targeting cities and landmarks of historic importance to Britain, in what was known as the Baedeker Blitz. He then progressed to organising intruder missions, a position for which he was promoted to wing commander. In September 1942, he was appointed commander of Hawkinge Station. At the time he was the youngest man to command a station in the RAF. He was awarded the Air Force Cross (AFC) in the 1943 New Year Honours; this was in recognition of his night fighter development work.

Aitken was later commander of RAF Bradwell Bay in Essex. This was the base for a number of night fighter squadrons that carried out intruder missions into occupied France. He remained in command for several months, including during the invasion of Normandy. For his all round work during the war to date, he was appointed an officer of the Order of the British Empire (OBE) on 8 June 1944. He ended the war as commander of No. 150 Airfield. As well as being awarded the OBE and AFC, he had also been mentioned in despatches three times; the first was for his air-sea rescue efforts during the Battle of Britain, the second for his night-fighter duties, and the third for his work in 1942 in assisting with the aerial defences of London.

== Later life ==
After the war, Aitken remained in the RAF, his commission being made permanent in March 1946. He commanded an air station in Burma and at one stage was posted to the Air Ministry, working in the personnel office. He was promoted to the rank of group captain at the start of 1954. In the 1958 Birthday Honours, Aitken was appointed a commander of the Order of the British Empire. Prior to his retirement from the RAF in 1961, he was the assistant commandant at the RAF's staff college at Andover.

Aitken returned to New Zealand and settled in Porirua, where he worked for the National Safety Association. He eventually became a director of the organisation, the predecessor to the Accident Compensation Corporation. In his retirement, he was a justice of the peace. He died on 25 February 1989 at Kenepuru Hospital in Wellington. His remains were cremated and interred at Porirua Cemetery. He was survived by his second wife, a daughter and two step-daughters. His first wife had predeceased him in 1984.
