= No. 85 (Expeditionary Logistics) Wing RAF =

- Wing Badge
- Active: 2006–present
- Country: United Kingdom
- Branch: Royal Air Force
- Type: Logistics
- Size: Wing
- Part of: No. 2 Group RAF
- Garrison/HQ: RAF Wittering
- Website: RAF Wittering

No. 85 Expeditionary Logistics Wing RAF is a wing of the Royal Air Force Support Force based at RAF Wittering, England.

It is made up of several ground transport and logistics handling squadrons, whose role is to establish air and sea ports of disembarkation and the associated supply chain all the way to the front line squadrons.

== Structure ==
No 85 (EL) Wg, with an establishment of approximately 350 personnel, comprises eight air combat service support units:

- No. 1 Expeditionary Logistics Squadron
- No. 2 Mechanical Transport Squadron
- No. 3 Mobile Catering Squadron
- RAF Mountain Rescue Service

The wing played a major role in the RAF deployment in the run-up to and during Operation Telic.

== Commanders ==
- Wing Commander D M Lester-Powell (2002–04)
- Wing Commander D H John (2004–06)
- Wing Commander A R Curtis (2006–09)
- Wing Commander E J Cole (2009–10)
- Wing Commander I D Reynolds (2010–12)
- Wing Commander A N Grant (2012–14)
- Wing Commander G Williams (2014–16)
- Wing Commander P Cane (2016–18)
- Wing Commander D H P Wright (2018–20)
- Wing Commander Wayne Tracey (2020–)
