= RAF Navy Point =

RAF Navy Point was a Royal Air Force base in the Falkland Islands. Set on a peninsula on which Canopus Hill, Stanley Airport and Gypsy Cove lie, together with a narrow spit of land known as Navy Point, which effectively divides Port William from Stanley Harbour. A small detachment of RAF SAR (search and rescue) Helicopters of No. 1564 Flight RAF were based here until the Detachment was moved to RAF Mount Pleasant when the new base opened.
