= RAF Search and Rescue Force =

Royal Air Force helicopter search and rescue unit, 1941-2016

Royal Air Force Search and Rescue Force
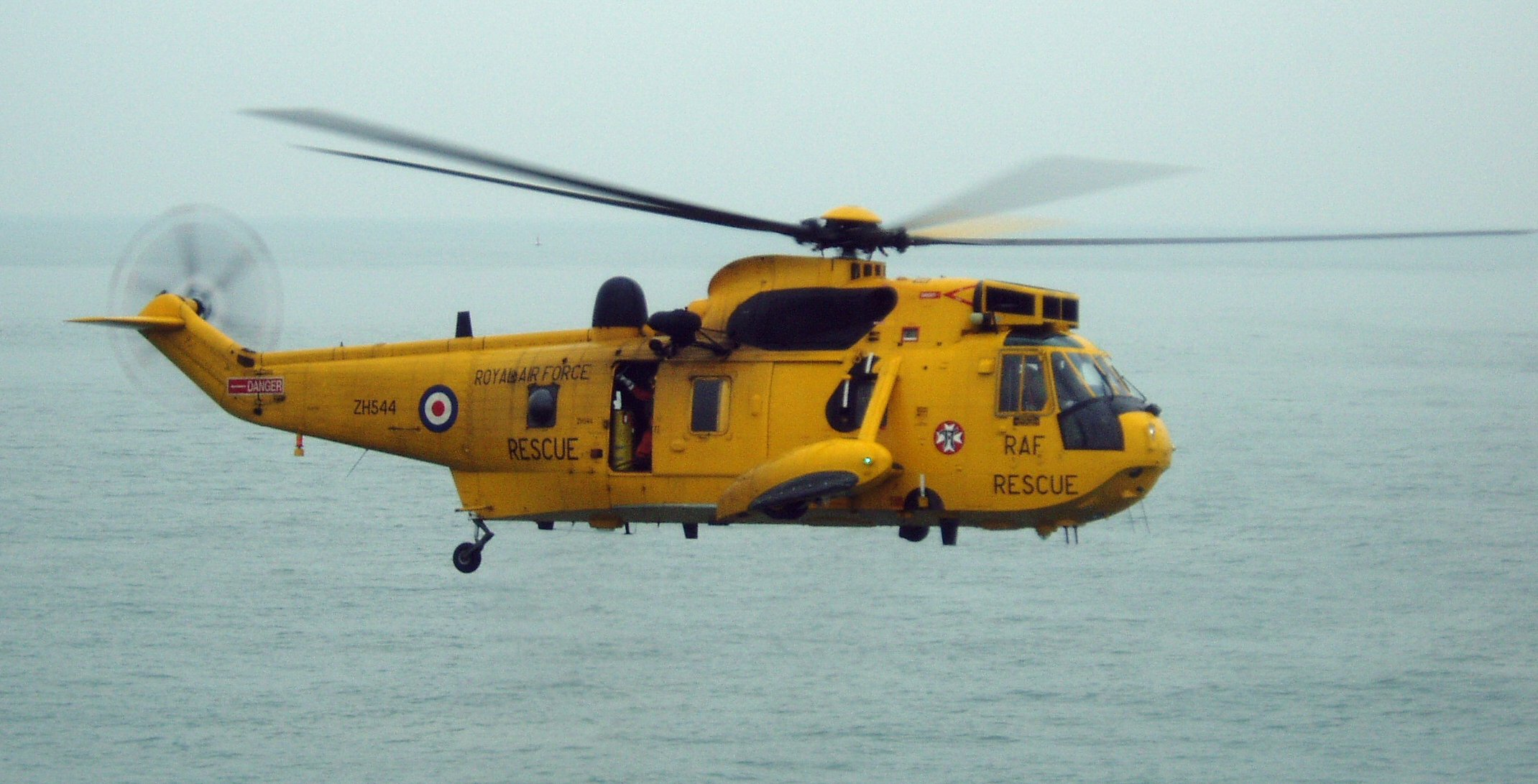
- Westland Sea King HAR3A
- Active: 1941 – 18 February 2016
- Disbanded: 18 February 2016
- Country: United Kingdom
- Branch: Royal Air Force
- Role: Search and Rescue

The Royal Air Force Search and Rescue Force (RAF SARF or RAF SAR Force) was a unit of the Royal Air Force (RAF) which provided around-the-clock aeronautical search and rescue cover in the United Kingdom, Cyprus, and the Falkland Islands, from 1986 until 2016.

The Search and Rescue Force was established in 1986 from the helicopter elements of the RAF Marine Branch which was disbanded that year. The Force supported search and rescue over the United Kingdom until 4 October 2015 when the role was privatised, and civilian contractor Bristow Helicopters assumed the role on behalf of HM Coastguard.

On 18 February 2016, the force's disbandment was officially marked with a parade in front of William, Duke of Cambridge, himself a former SAR pilot, and Catherine, Duchess of Cambridge, his wife.

== History ==
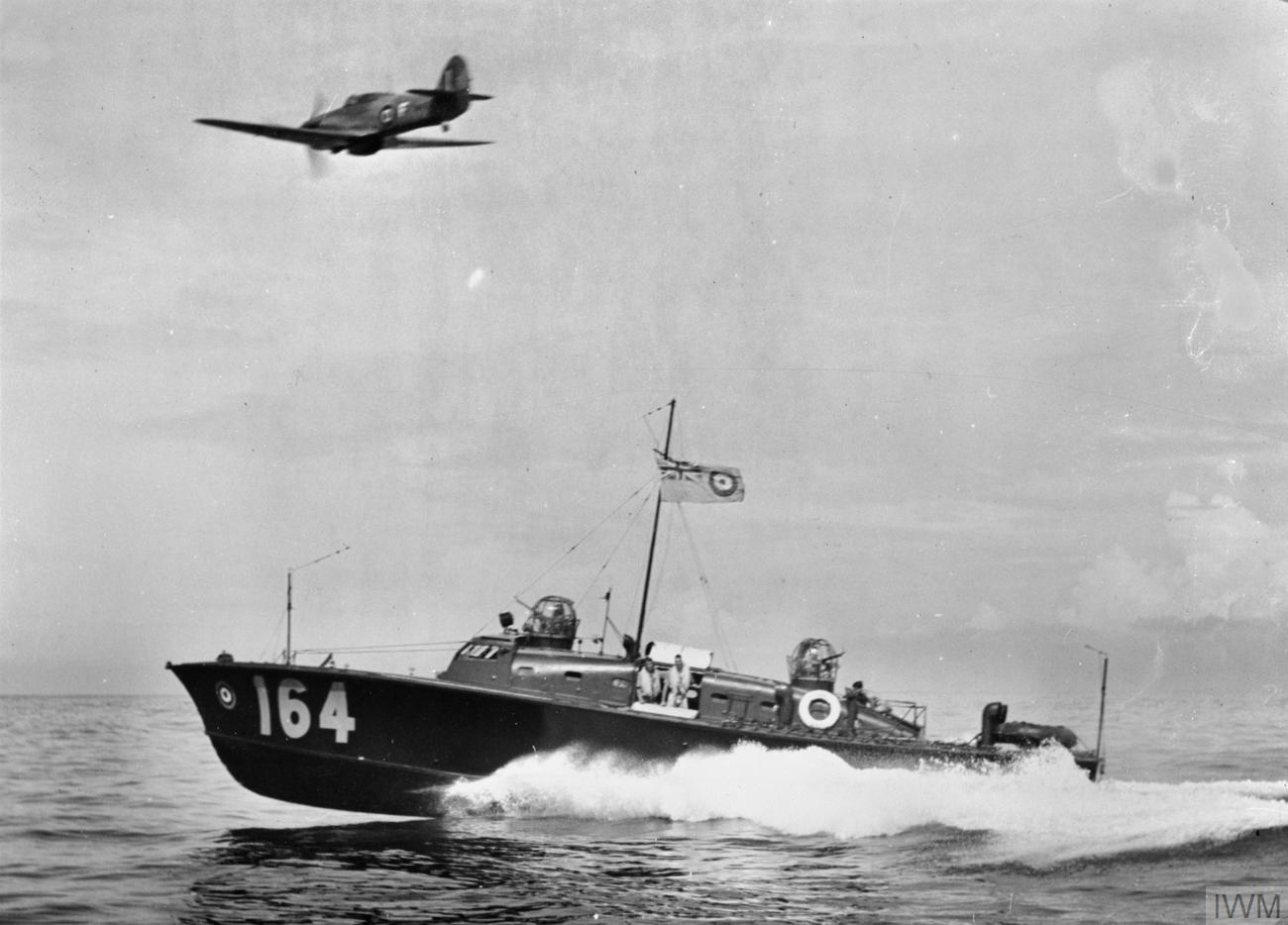
Whaleback high speed air-sea rescue launch HSL 164 off Ceylon in 1943.

In 1918, the Royal Air Force was established through the merging of the aviation arms of the Royal Navy, the Royal Navy Air Service (RNAS), and that of the Army, the Royal Flying Corps. Together with its aircraft, vessels acquired to support RAF seaplane operations were also transferred to the new service, becoming the Marine Craft Section (MCS).

Post-war, the Marine Craft Section became a force of 150 vessels, which in addition to supporting the operation of seaplanes, were equipped for rescue operations, with a launch being at the ready whenever an aircraft was flying over water. However, the training and seamanship of the crews, especially with regards to navigation, meant that the MCS at this time was only suitable for inshore rescue operations.

As the vessels it had inherited from the Royal Navy began wear out, the RAF began to have built for launches capable of higher speeds, and in light of the larger crews of some aircraft, greater capacity. This would, in the late 1930s, lead to the acquiring of High Speed Launches (HSL) for rescue operations.

During the Second World War, the Marine Craft Section found itself ill-prepared for war. During the Battle of Britain, even with the help of civilian vessels and the Royal Navy, aircrew who baled out or ditched in the North Sea and English Channel had only a 20 percent chance of being returned to their squadrons, with over 200 pilots and aircrew being lost to the sea during the battle. An informal air-sea rescue was started in July 1940 by Flying Officer Russell Aitken, who with the approval of his senior officer at RAF Gosport, began flying a Supermarine Walrus to rescue pilots downed in the English Channel. By the end of August, when he ceased this work, he had rescued around 35 British and German aircrew.

In light of this, in 1941, an emergency meeting was convened by Air Marshal Sir Arthur 'Bomber' Harris. The Royal Navy offered to take over in its entirety the at sea rescue role, the RAF declined and subsequently created the Directorate of Air Sea Rescue on 6 February 1941, which adopted the motto 'The sea shall not have them'. Operationally, it was to become known as Air Sea Rescue Services (ASRS), which ultimately became the RAF Search and Rescue Force. The headquarters of the ASRS was co-located with that of RAF Coastal Command with which it operated closely.

Together with creation of specialist Air Sea Rescue Units (ASRU), ASRS worked to improve the survival of aircrews through the development and issue of better individual survival equipment, including one man inflatable dinghies for fighter pilots copied from the Germans; the training of aircrew in ditching drills to maximise their chances of surviving to be retrieved; the development and fielding of air droppable survival equipment; and coordination between the different services, branches and units towards the goal of locating and recovering of downed airmen.

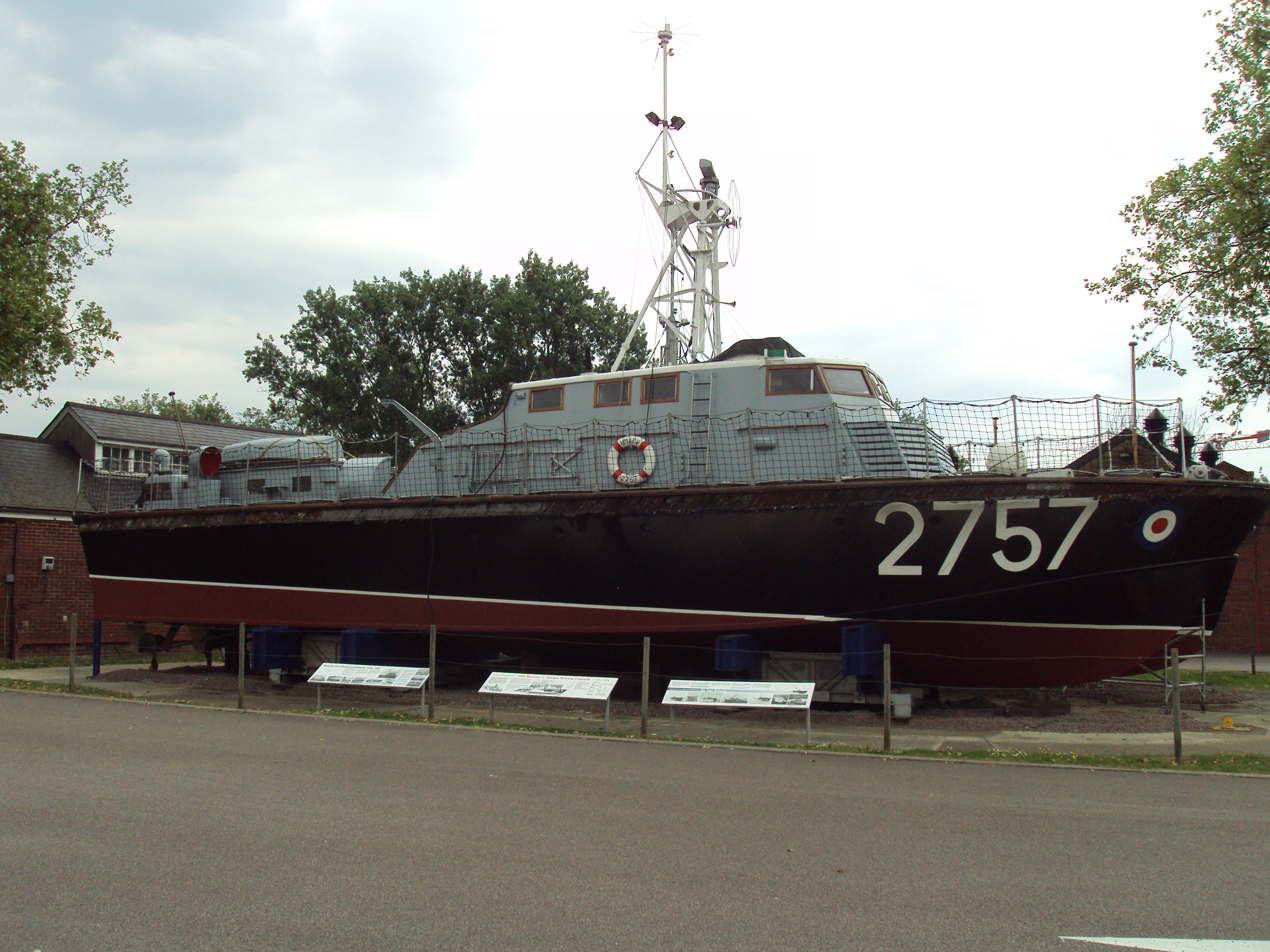
Rescue & Target Towing Launch (RTTL) 2757, built in 1957, in the Grounds of the Royal Air Force Museum London, Hendon.

The air-sea rescue squadrons of the ASRS flew a variety of aircraft, usually hand-me-downs rejected or withdrawn from front-line service by the RAF's other branches, or as in the case of the Walrus, begged from the Royal Navy. They used Supermarine Spitfires and Boulton Paul Defiants to patrol for downed aircrew, and Avro Ansons to drop supplies and dinghies. Supermarine Walrus and Supermarine Sea Otter amphibious craft were used to pick up aircrew from the water. Larger aircraft were used to drop airborne lifeboats. Although the Walrus and Sea Otters could pick up survivors close to shore and in coastal waters further out to sea, it was still not possible for aircraft to routinely pick up survivors, the large flying boats that could do so, such as the Consolidated Catalinas and Short Sunderlands of Coastal Command, had many other jobs to do and were not always available. The role of aircraft in the ASRS therefore, was to locate downed airmen and to keep them alive, by dropping them survival equipment and stores, until an ASRS launch, or one from the Royal Navy's Naval Sea Rescue Services, arrived to pick them up. Generally MCS craft had responsibility for the Channel and North Sea, and Royal Navy ones for the Western Approaches.

By the end of the Second World War, more than 8,000 aircrew and 5,000 civilians had been rescued. At the end of the Second World War, the MCS had some 300 HSLs and over a thousand other vessels, the largest fleet of such rescue craft in the world. This fleet and the RAF sailors that crewed it would contract as the RAF did, however it continued be found everywhere that the RAF flew over water.

=== Introduction of helicopters ===
In the mid 1950s, helicopters began to replace fixed-wing aircraft and supplement the marine craft in the search and rescue role, their ability to hover giving them an ability to recover survivors that fixed wing aircraft did not have. It was not until the 1960s, with the introduction of the Westland Whirlwind, the Westland Wessex, and later the Westland Sea King, that it was possible to replace marine craft in all sea and weather conditions. Helicopters have the advantage of speed, which means that the same coverage as marine craft can be provided with far fewer bases and much reduced personnel numbers. However, even into the 1970s, helicopters had not completely replaced RAF marine craft, however by this time the MCS craft were becoming increasingly elderly and service in the MCS increasingly unattractive.

In 1986, the Marine Branch was disbanded, the last of the RAF's vessels were retired. Henceforth the RAF's rescue operations would be entirely helicopter based, Air Sea Rescue Services would be renamed the RAF Search and Rescue Force.

== Role ==
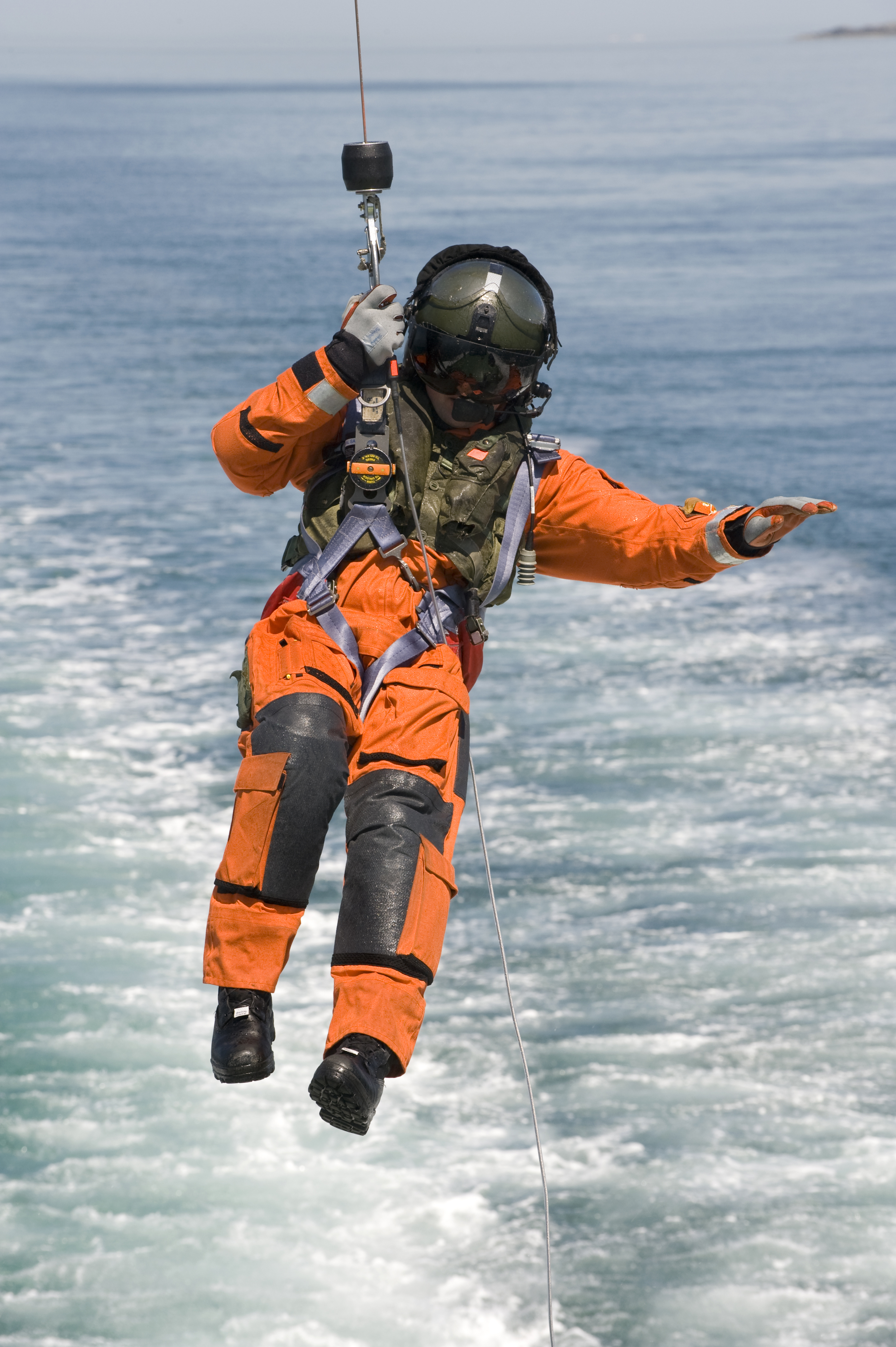
A SAR Force winchman practising drills.

The SARF's primary roles were military search and rescue, and the provision of rescue for civilian aircraft in distress under the 1948 Chicago Convention. The latter was a delegated responsibility to the UK Ministry of Defence (MoD) from the Department of Transport, who had primary responsibility for general search and rescue of any type throughout the UK Search and Rescue Region (UK SRR). The military role involved the rescuing of aircrew who have ejected or parachuted from, or crash-landed their aircraft. This role raises the wartime combat effectiveness of the RAF (and RN) by enabling downed aircrew to be returned to front-line flying duties as soon as possible.

Although established with a primary role of military search and rescue, most of SARF's operational missions were spent in its secondary role, conducting civil search and rescue. This entails the rescue of civilians from the sea, on mountains, from flooded regions or other locations on land.

The aeronautical search and rescue roles were complemented by the related Royal Air Force Mountain Rescue Service, whose trained mountaineers also conduct search and rescue in hilly terrain. SARF helicopters and RAF mountaineers often work together on mountain rescue incidents.

The military and civil roles were shared with the Sea King helicopters of the Royal Navy's Fleet Air Arm, while the civil search and rescue role was also shared with the helicopters of HM Coastguard.

== Organisation ==
Search and Rescue Helicopter Wing

The wing was formed at RAF Finningley on 1 September 1976, it was disbanded on 1 December 1992.

Search and Rescue Training Unit

The Search and Rescue Training Unit was formed on 3 December 1979 at RAF Valley.

=== No. 22 Squadron RAF ===
15 February 1955 to June 1955 - HQ at RAF Thorney Island

- Bristol Sycamore HC.12
  - 'A' Flight

June 1955 to June 1956 - HQ at RAF Thorney Island

- Westland Whirlwind HAR.2

flight	RAF station	county	from	until	notes
A	RAF Thorney Island	Hampshire	June 1955	June 1956	
A	RAF St Mawgan	Cornwall	June 1956	April 1956	
B	RAF Martlesham Heath	Suffolk	25 June 1955	April 1956	
B	RAF Felixstowe	Suffolk	April 1956	June 1956	Flight moved from Martlesham Heath
C	RAF Valley	Anglesey	27 September 1955	June 1956	

June 1956 to April 1974 - HQ at RAF St Mawgan

- Westland Whirlwind HAR.2 until August 1962 replaced by Whirlwind HAR.10s from August 1962

flight	RAF station	county	from	until	notes
A	RAF St Mawgan	Cornwall	June 1956	November 1958	Moved to Chivenor
A	RAF Chivenor	Devon	November 1958	April 1974	moved from St Mawgan
B	RAF Felixstowe	Suffolk	June 1956	May 1961	disbanded
B	RAF Tangmere	West Sussex	June 1961	February 1973	reformed, disbanded.
B	RAF Coltishall	Norfolk	April 1973	April 1974	reformed
C	RAF Valley	Anglesey	June 1956	April 1974	
D	RAF Manston	Kent	July 1961	March 1969	
unknown	RAF St Mawgan	Cornwall	October 1956		preparation for Operation Grapple
unknown	RAF Thorney Island	Hampshire		December 1959	

April 1974 to January 1976 - HQ at RAF Thorney Island

- Whirlwind HAR.10

flight	RAF station	county	from	until	notes
A	RAF Chivenor	Devon	April 1974	January 1976	
B	RAF Coltishall	Norfolk	April 1974	January 1976	
C	RAF Valley	Anglesey	April 1974	January 1976	
unknown	RAF Brawdy	Pembrokeshire			
unknown	RAF Leuchars	Fife			

January 1976 to June 1976 - HQ at RAF Finningley

- Whirlwind HAR.10

flight	RAF station	county	from	until	notes
A	RAF Chivenor	Devon	January 1976	June 1976	
B	RAF Coltishall	Norfolk	January 1976	April 1976	moved to Leuchars
B	RAF Leuchars	Fife	April 1976	June 1976	from Coltishall
C	RAF Valley	Anglesey	January 1976	June 1976	
unknown	RAF Brawdy	Pembrokeshire			
unknown	RAF Manston	Kent			
unknown	RAF Leconfield	East Riding of Yorkshire			

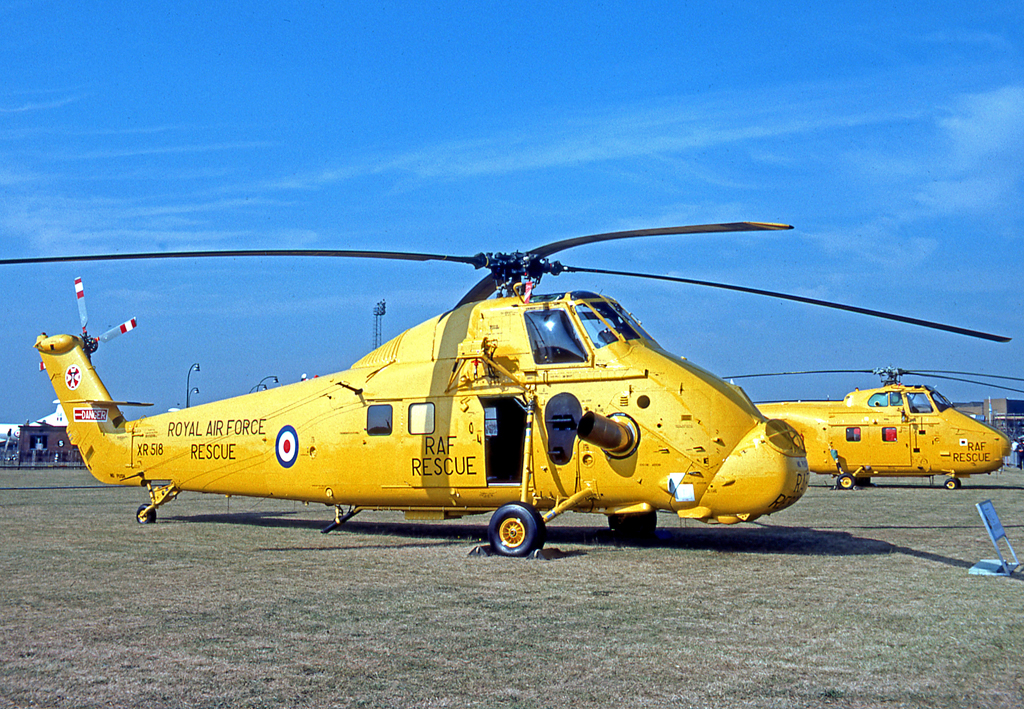
22 Squadron Westland Wessex HAR.2 on display at RAF Finningley in 1977.

June 1976 to December 1992 - HQ at RAF Finningley

- Westland Wessex HAR.2

flight	RAF station	county	from	until	notes
HQ	RAF Finningley	South Yorkshire		1 October 1992	
HQ	RAF St Mawgan	Cornwall	1 October 1992		
A	RAF Chivenor	Devon	June 1976	December 1992	
B	RAF Leuchars	Fife	June 1976	December 1992	
C	RAF Valley	Anglesey	June 1976	December 1992	
D	RAF Leconfield	East Riding of Yorkshire			
E	RAF Manston	Kent			
E	RAF Coltishall	Norfolk		December 1992	

December 1992 to September 1997 - HQ at RAF St Mawgan

- Westland Wessex HAR.2
- Westland Sea King HAR.3 from June 1994
- Westland Sea King HAR.3A from May 1997

flight	RAF station	county	from	until	notes
HQ	RAF St Mawgan	Cornwall			
A	RM Chivenor	Devon	December 1992		Sea King's from disbanded B Flight, 202 Sqn from June 1994
B	RAF Leuchars	Fife	December 1992	March 1994	disbanded
B	Wattisham Airfield	Suffolk	18 July 1994		Sea King's from disbanded C Flight, 202 Sqn
C	RAF Valley	Anglesey	December 1992	September 1997	
E	RAF Coltishall	Norfolk	December 1992	21 July 1994	disbanded

September 1997 to unknown - HQ at RMB Chivenor

- Westland Sea King HAR.3/3A

flight	base	county	from	until	notes
A	RM Chivenor	Devon			HAR.3A
B	Wattisham Airfield	Suffolk			HAR.3A
C	RAF Valley	Anglesey	September 1997		HAR.3

Unknown to October 2015 - HQ at RAF Valley

- Westland Sea King HAR.3/3A

flight	base	county	from	until	notes
A	RM Chivenor	Devon		October 2015	
B	Wattisham Airfield	Suffolk			
C	RAF Valley	Anglesey		July 2015	

=== No. 110 Squadron RAF ===
3 June 1959 to 15 February 1971 - HQ at RAF Kuala Lumpur

- Whirlwind HC.4/HAR.10 and Sycamore HR.13 (April 1960-October 1964)

flight	base	county	from	until	notes
unknown	Nanga Gaat	Borneo	1963	November 1967	Indonesia–Malaysia confrontation
unknown		Brunei Darussalam	1963	November 1967	Indonesia–Malaysia confrontation

=== No. 202 Squadron RAF ===
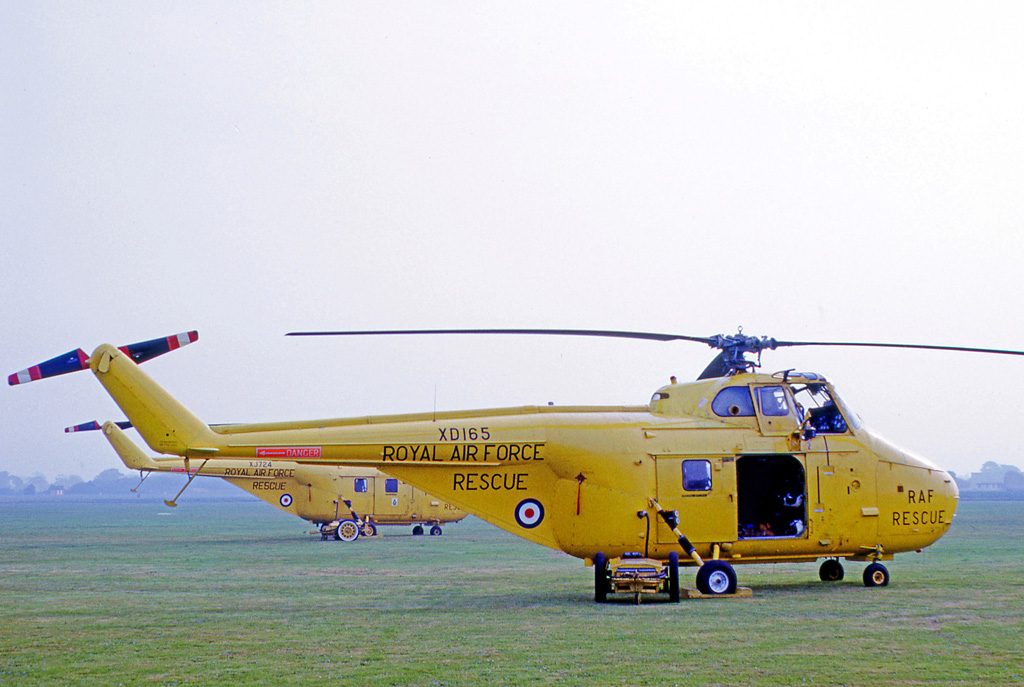
Westland Whirlwind HAR.10 of 202 Squadron at RAF Coltishall in 1971.

August 1964 to September 1976 - HQ at RAF Leconfield

- Whirlwind HAR.10

flight	RAF station	county	from	until	notes
A	RAF Acklington	Northumberland	September 1974	21 October 1975	
A	RAF Boulmer	Northumberland	21 October 1975	September 1976	
C	RAF Coltishall	Norfolk	1973	September 1976	previously D Flight
D	RAF Coltishall	Norfolk	August 1964	April 1973	disbanded
D	RAF Coltishall	Norfolk	September 1973	1973	became C Flight
D	RAF Lossiemouth	Moray	18 February 1973	September 1976	previously B Flight, 22 Sqn
unknown	RAF Leuchars	Fife			
unknown	RAF Ouston	Northumberland			

September 1976 to 1 December 1992 - HQ at RAF Finningley

- Whirlwind HAR.10 until November 1979, Westland Sea King HAR.3 and Westland Wessex HAR.2

flight	RAF station	county	from	until	notes
A	RAF Boulmer	Northumberland	July 1978	December 1992	
B	RAF Brawdy	Pembrokeshire		1989	
C	RAF Coltishall	Norfolk	July 1978	1982	moved to the Falkland Islands
C	RAF Stanley	Falkland Islands	1982	August 1983	became No. 1564 Flight RAF
C	RAF Manston	Kent		December 1992	active 1989 during Marchioness disaster
D	RAF Lossiemouth	Moray	July 1978	December 1992	
E	RAF Leconfield	East Riding of Yorkshire	November 1988	December 1992	previously D Flight, 22 Sqn

1 December 1992 to April 2008 - HQ at RAF Boulmer

- Westland Sea King HAR.3

flight	RAF station	county	from	until	notes
A	RAF Boulmer	Northumberland	December 1992	April 2008	
B	RAF Brawdy	Pembrokeshire	1989	1 April 1994	
B	RAF Chivenor	Devon	1 April 1994		
C	RAF Manston	Kent	December 1992	18 July 1994	
D	RAF Lossiemouth	Moray	December 1992	April 2008	
E	RAF Leconfield	East Yorkshire	December 1992	April 2008	

April 2008 to October 2015 - HQ at RAF Valley

- Westland Sea King HAR.3

flight	RAF station	county	from	until	notes
A	RAF Boulmer	Northumberland	April 2008	October 2015	
D	RAF Lossiemouth	Moray	April 2008	April 2015	
E	RAF Leconfield	East Yorkshire	April 2008	March 2015	

=== No. 228 Squadron RAF ===
September 1959 to August 1964 - HQ at RAF Leconfield

- Bristol Sycamore and Westland Whirlwind

flight	RAF station	county	from	until	notes
unknown	RAF Aldergrove	Co. Antrim			flight became 118 Sqn

Disbanded into 202 Squadron.

=== No. 275 Squadron RAF ===
15 October 1941 to April 1944 - HQ at RAF Valley

- Westland Lysander, Supermarine Walrus, Boulton Paul Defiant, Supermarine Spitfire and Avro Anson

flight	RAF station	county	from	until	notes
unknown	RAF Andreas	Isle of Man	30 November 1941	25 Apr 1944	
unknown	RAF Eglinton	Co. Londonderry	30 May 1943	14 Apr 1944	

April 1944 to August 1944 - HQ at RAF Warmwell

7 August 1944 to 18 October 1944 - HQ at RAF Bolt Head

flight	RAF station	county	from	until	notes
unknown	RAF Portreath	Cornwall	7 August 1944	18 October 1944	

18 October 1944 to 10 January 1945 - HQ at RAF Exeter

flight	RAF station	county	from	until	notes
unknown	RAF Portreath	Cornwall	18 October 1944	10 January 1945	
unknown	RAF Bolt Head	Devon	18 October 1944	10 January 1945	

10 January 1945 to 15 February 1945 - HQ at RAF Harrowbeer

flight	RAF station	county	from	until	notes
unknown	RAF Portreath	Cornwall	10 January 1945	15 February 1945	
unknown	RAF Bolt Head	Devon	10 January 1945	15 February 1945	

Disbanded between 1945 and 1953.

1 March 1953 to 18 November 1954 - HQ at RAF Linton-on-Ouse

- Bristol Sycamore HR.13/HR.14

18 November 1954 to 9 October 1957 - HQ at RAF Thornaby

9 October 1957 to 1 September 1959 - HQ at RAF Leconfield

- Converted to Whirlwind HAR.2/HAR.4 in March 1959

Disbanded into 228 Squadron.

=== No. 276 Squadron RAF ===
21 October 1941 to September 1944 - HQ at RAF Harrowbeer

- Lysander, Walrus, Hurricanes, Defiants, Spitfires, and Ansons
- Vickers Warwicks replaced Ansons from April 1944

flight	base	county	from	until	notes
unknown	Querqueville	France	August 1944	September 1944	covering Normandy landings

September 1944 to unknown - HQ at Querqueville

- Lysander, Walrus, Hurricanes, Defiants, Spitfires, and Warwicks
- Warwicks assigned to 277 Squadron in October 1944

Unknown to 23 August 1945 - HQ in Belgium

23 August 1945 to 10 November 1945 - HQ at Kjevik, Norway

10 November 1945 to 14 November 1945 - HQ at RAF Dunsfold

=== No. 277 Squadron RAF ===
22 December 1941 to 26 February 1945 - HQ at RAF Stapleford Tawney

- Lysander, Walrus, Defiant, Spitfire, Sea Otter, and Warwick

Detachments at RAF Martlesham Heath, RAF Hawkinge, RAF Shoreham, and RAF Tangmere.

=== No. 279 Squadron RAF ===
16 November 1941 to October 1944 – HQ at RAF Bircham Newton

- Lockheed Hudson

flight	RAF station	county	from	until	notes
unknown	RAF Sumburgh	Shetland Islands	28 April 1942	29 May 1942	
unknown	RAF Benbecula	Outer Hebrides	29 June 1942	1942	
unknown	RAF Leuchars	Fife	15 July 1942	1942	
unknown	RAF Reykjavik	Iceland	26 July 1942	15 August 1942	
unknown	RAF Thorney Island	West Sussex	14 August 1942	15 August 1942	
unknown	RAF Chivenor	Devon	15 August 1942	19 August 1942	
unknown	RAF St Eval	Cornwall	23 August 1942	5 February 1943	
unknown	RAF Beaulieu	Hampshire	25 September 1942	1942	
unknown	RAF Davidstow Moor	Cornwall	5 February 1943	9 June 1943	
unknown	RAF Harrowbeer	Devon	9 June 1943	14 December 1943	
unknown	RAF Wick	Highlands	28 September 1943	1945	
unknown	RAF Reykjavik	Iceland	1 January 1944	1 August 1944	

October 1944 to September 1945 - HQ at RAF Thornaby

- Vickers Warwick

flight	RAF station	county	from	until	notes
unknown	RAF Tain	Ross and Cromarty	1 October 1944	September 1945	
unknown	RAF Wick	Highlands	1 October 1944	September 1945	
unknown	RAF Banff	Aberdeenshire	31 October 1944	27 December 1944	
unknown	RAF Fraserburgh	Aberdeenshire	27 December 1944	September 1945	
unknown	RAF Reykjavik	Iceland	26 May 1945	September 1945	
unknown	RAF Banff	Aberdeenshire	July 1945	September 1945	
1348 (ASR) Flt	RAF Pegu	Burma	July 1945	unknown	

3 September 1945 to 10 March 1946 - HQ at RAF Beccles

=== 2015 status ===
Operational locations of aeronautical search and rescue cover in the United Kingdom. The colour of the location mark indicates the agency providing helicopter response (blue: Fleet Air Arm, yellow: RAF Search and Rescue Force, red: HM Coastguard).

The RAF SAR Force headquarters was situated at RAF Valley on Anglesey. In addition to the Force HQ proper, the HQ building housed the HQs of the RAFs two operational SAR squadrons in the UK (22 and 202), as well as the RAF Sea King simulator. SAR Force HQ controlled the SAR Force's three helicopter squadrons and one independent flight. These were:

- No. 22 Squadron equipped with the Sea King HAR.3/HAR.3A;
- No. 202 Squadron equipped with the Sea King HAR.3;
- No. 84 Squadron based at RAF Akrotiri in Cyprus and equipped with the Griffin HAR.2;
- No. 1564 Flight based at RAF Mount Pleasant in the Falkland Islands and equipped with the Sea King HAR.3.

SARF's Operational Conversion Unit was No. 203 Squadron also based at RAF Valley and equipped with the Sea King HAR.3.

== Coordination ==
In the United Kingdom, maritime search and rescue is coordinated by HM Coastguard, while land-based operations are usually coordinated by the local Police force.

From 1941 until the end of 1997, there were two Aeronautical Rescue Coordination Centres (ARCC); at Plymouth and at Edinburgh. These two were combined in 1997 at RAF Kinloss in the north of Scotland. All requests for assistance from the emergency services throughout the United Kingdom (Police, Fire, Ambulance, and Coastguard) were handled at this single ARCC until March 2016, when responsibility for the service was transferred to civilian personnel of HM Coastguard.

== Privatisation and disbandment ==
Operational locations of aeronautical search and rescue cover in the United Kingdom as of 2026. The colour of the location mark indicates the type of helicopter at each location (blue: AgustaWestland AW189, red: Sikorsky S-92).

In 2006, the government announced controversial plans to effectively privatise provision of search and rescue helicopters in order to replace the ageing Sea Kings, although it was suggested that crews could, at least partially, still be made up of military personnel.

In February 2010, Soteria SAR was announced as the 'preferred bidder' for the UK SAR programme. On 8 February 2011, days before the contract was due to be signed, the UK Government halted the process after Soteria admitted that it had unauthorised access to commercially sensitive information regarding the programme.

While this contract was being renegotiated, a 'gap' contract was tendered for the existing Maritime and Coastguard Agency (MCA) bases, and in February 2012, it was announced that Bristow Helicopters would take over the running of Stornoway and Sumburgh using Sikorsky S-92s, and that Portland and Lee on Solent would be retained by CHC Helicopter using AgustaWestland AW139s.

In March 2013, the Department for Transport announced that it had signed a contract with Bristow Helicopters to provide search and rescue helicopter services in the UK with operations commencing progressively from 2015. The new service was fully operational across the United Kingdom by May 2019, and uses AgustaWestland AW189s and Sikorsky S-92s based at ten locations around the UK.

== See also ==
- History of Royal Navy Helicopter Search and Rescue
- Rescue (British TV series)
