= RAF Valley =

Royal Air Force training station in Isle of Anglesey, Wales

RAF Valley
- Llu Awyr Brenhinol Y Fali
- Near Holyhead, Anglesey in Wales
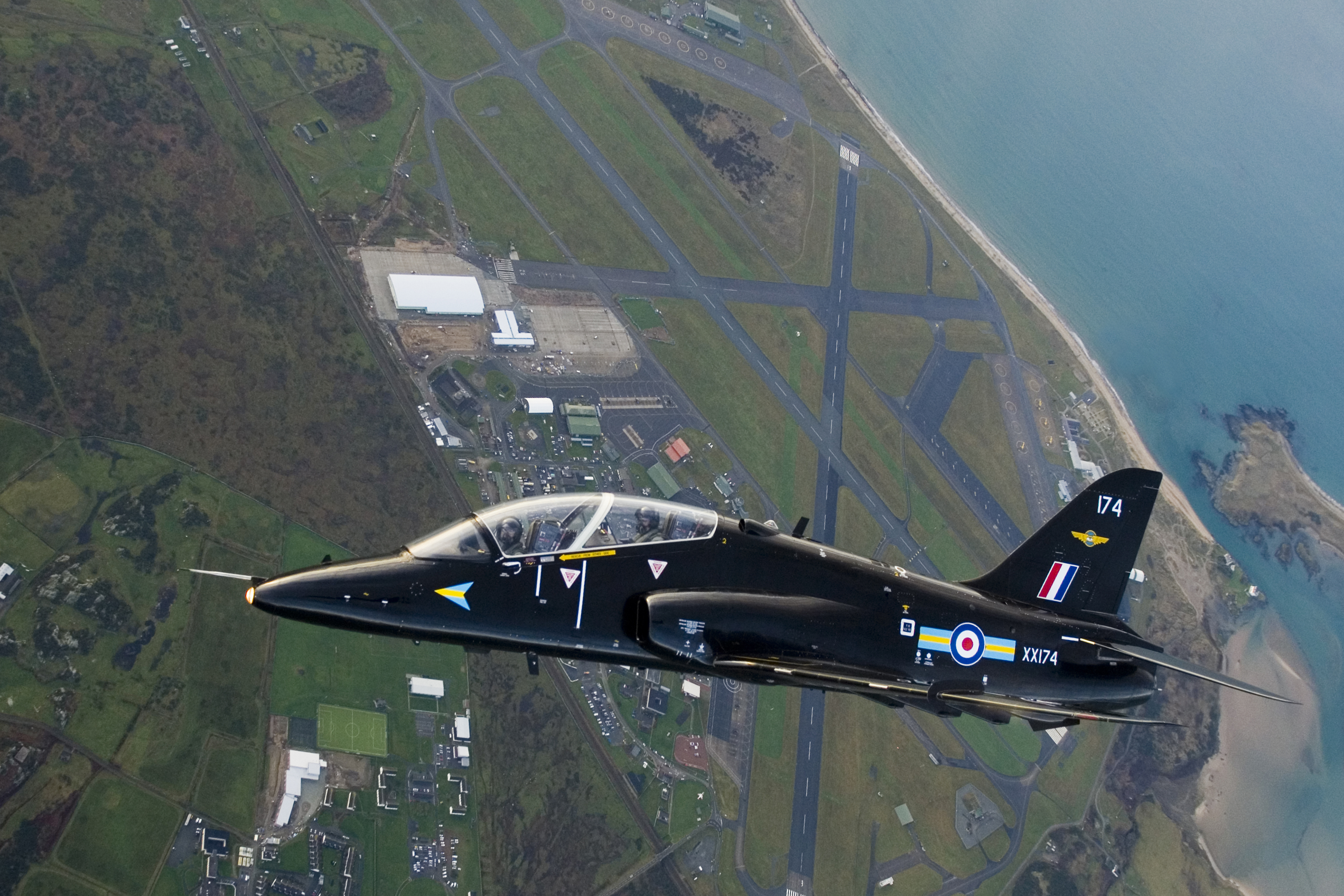
- A RAF Hawk T.1 flying over RAF Valley.

- In Adversis Perfugium (Latin for 'Refuge in Adversity')

Site information
- Type: Training station
- Owner: Ministry of Defence
- Operator: Royal Air Force
- Controlled by: No. 2 Group; No. 22 Group (Training)
- Website: www.raf.mod.uk/our-organisation/stations/raf-valley/

Location
- Shown within Anglesey RAF Valley (the United Kingdom)
- Coordinates: 53°14′53″N 004°32′07″W

Site history
- Built: 1941
- In use: 1941 – present

Garrison information
- Current commander: No. 2 Group RAF - Group Captain Gez Currie; No. 22 Group - Group Captain Matt Hoare
- Occupants: No. 4 Squadron; No. 25 Squadron; No. 72 Squadron; No. 202 Squadron; HQ RAF Mountain Rescue Service; RAF Valley Mountain Rescue Team

Airfield information
- Identifiers: IATA: VLY, ICAO: EGOV, WMO: 03302
- Elevation: 11 metres (36 ft) AMSL
Runways
| Direction | Length and surface |
|---|---|
| 13/31 | 2,290 metres (7,513 ft) Asphalt |
| 01/19 | 1,639 metres (5,377 ft) Asphalt |

Royal Air Force Valley or more simply RAF Valley (Welsh: Llu Awyr Brenhinol Y Fali) (IATA: VLY, ICAO: EGOV) is a Royal Air Force station on the island of Anglesey, Wales, which is also used as Anglesey Airport. It provides both basic and advanced fast-jet training using the Beechcraft Texan T.1 and BAE Systems Hawk T.2 and provides mountain and maritime training for aircrew using the Airbus Jupiter HT.1 helicopter.

== History ==
=== Second World War ===
The airfield was constructed to the south of the village of Valley (Y Fali) or Y Dyffryn in the latter part of 1940 and opened for operations on 1 February 1941 as a Fighter Sector Station under No. 9 Group RAF with the task of providing defence cover for England's industrial north-west and shipping in the Irish Sea. Initial detachments were made by Hawker Hurricanes of 312 (Czechoslovak) Squadron RAF and 615 (County of Surrey) Squadron AAF. A detachment of Bristol Beaufighters of 219 (Mysore) Squadron provided night fighter cover.

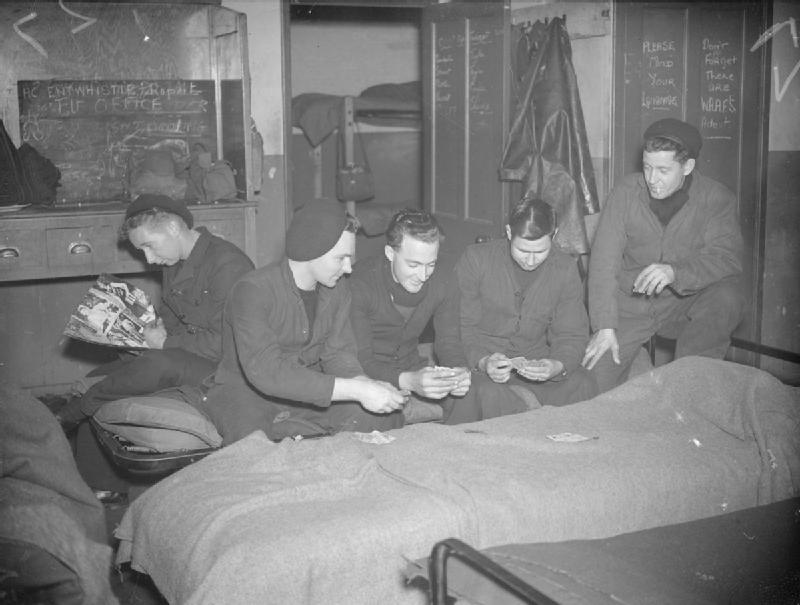
Royal Air Force 1939–1945 Fighter Command armourers relaxing in their quarters

No. 456 Squadron Royal Australian Air Force (RAAF) formed at Valley on 30 June 1941 and became operational on 5 September flying Boulton Paul Defiants. By November the squadron had been completely re-equipped with Beaufighter IIs, and these provided defensive night patrols over the Irish Sea until March 1943, when the unit moved to RAF Middle Wallop.

As a result of many accidents in the Irish Sea, due to the number of training aircraft active in the area, 275 Squadron formed at Valley in October 1941, equipped with Westland Lysanders and Supermarine Walrus amphibians and these performed Air-sea rescue (ASR) missions until the unit moved to RAF Warmwell in April 1944.

The runways and taxiways were extended in early 1943, and on 19 June 1943 the United States Army Air Forces (USAAF) Ferry Terminal became operational. This handled American aircraft arriving from transatlantic flights and on European sorties. Eleven Consolidated B-24 Liberators of the United States Navy arrived from Iceland on 17 August. During the winter of 1943/1944, the ferry route was switched to a southerly route via the Azores and Marrakesh and on 18 February, 62 Douglas C-47 Skytrains arrived from North Africa. One of Valley's busiest days was on 17 September 1944 when 99 USAAF Boeing B-17 Flying Fortresses and Liberators were ferried in from Iceland. In the middle of 1944 there was a daily transatlantic Douglas C-54 Skymaster service from Stephenville bringing airmen of all ranks, who continued their journeys to London on the LMSR Irish Mail train from Holyhead.

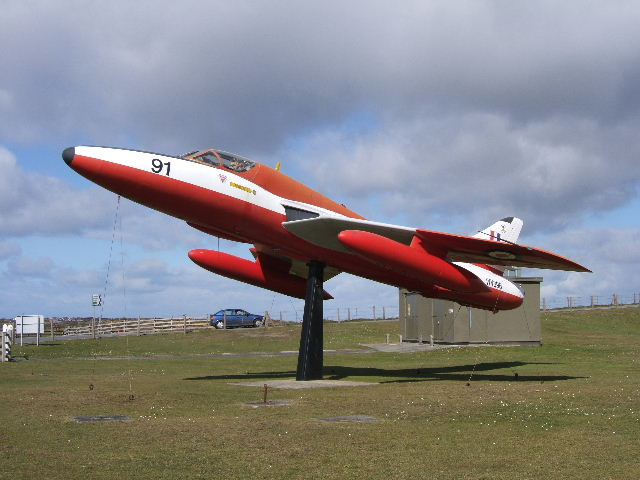
Gate Guardian of RAF Valley Hawker Hunter WV396.

Because of the large scale USAAF activities at Valley, RAF operations were scaled down, but on 1 November 1944, No. 1528 BAT Flight re-formed here operating Airspeed Oxford twin-engined aircraft which were used in the Beam Approach training role until moving out on 17 December 1945.

RAF Valley's USAAF ferry role was reversed as soon as the European War ended, and over 2,600 bombers passed through on their way back to the US for redeployment, each carrying 20 passengers and crew. The USAAF Movement Section closed in September 1945, and in June 1947 the airfield was put on a care and maintenance basis.

=== Postwar operations ===
During 1950 many improvements were made to the hangars and buildings at Valley, and on 1 April 1951 No. 202 Advanced Flying School was reformed here within No. 25 Group to train fighter pilots on de Havilland Vampire and Gloster Meteor jet aircraft. Vampire FB.5 and T.11 and Meteor T.7 marks were used until the unit was redesignated No. 7 Flying Training School (FTS) on 1 June 1954. On 15 August 1960 the unit was renumbered No. 4 FTS RAF which is still based at the airfield.

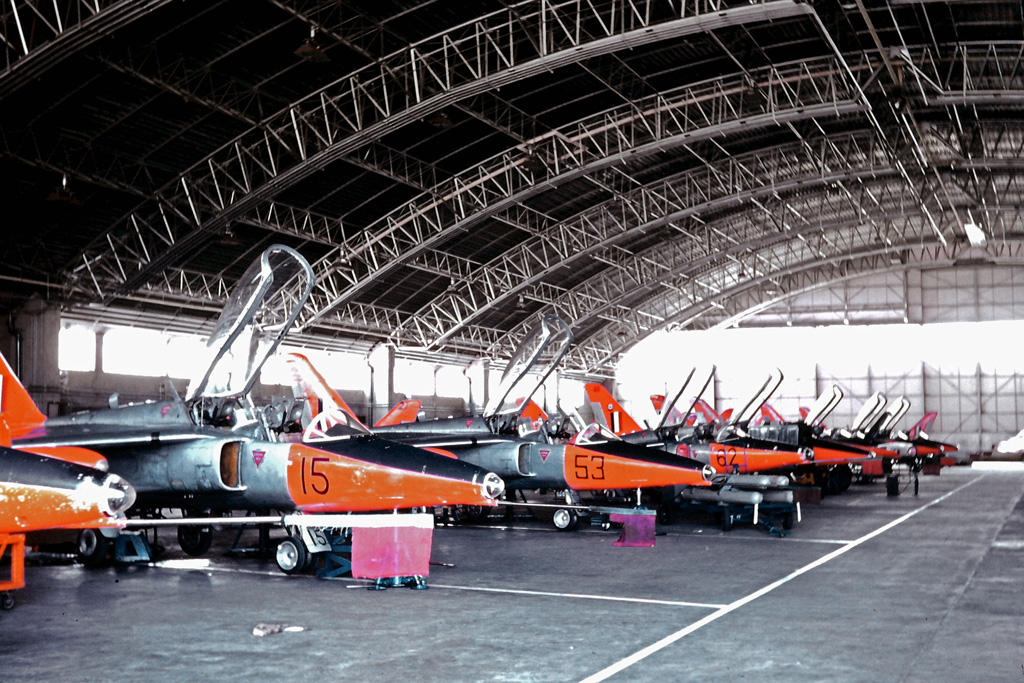
4 FTS Gnat T.1 trainers in the Valley maintenance hangar in 1967

The first Folland Gnat jet trainers were received on 7 November 1962 and many examples of the type were successfully operated for many years. These were supplemented by Hawker Hunters for advanced training, marks F.6 and T.7 being used. The first Hawker Siddeley Hawk T.1s arrived on 11 November 1976 and a modified version of this type is still in use by 4 FTS called the BAE Systems Hawk T.2.

RAF Valley previously hosted the Headquarters and 'C Flight' of No. 22 Squadron, part of the RAF's Search and Rescue Force. By October 2015, the RAF SAR Force had been relieved of their responsibility by a new contractor-led operation, run by Bristow Helicopters, and the nearest SAR unit is now based at Caernarfon Airport. The RAF Operational Conversion Unit, 203(R) Squadron, was also based at Valley to train new aircrew onto the Westland Sea King HAR.3/3A, and prepare them for their SAR operations. The then Duke of Cambridge, Prince William, now heir apparent to the British Throne, was assigned to C Flight, 22 Squadron at RAF Valley, as a pilot flying the Sea King search and rescue helicopter. He finished his last shift as a pilot on Tuesday 10 September 2013.

No. 208(R) Squadron, which provided legacy Hawk T.1 advanced flying training and tactical weapons training, disbanded in June 2016.

In September 2017, a project to upgrade the airfield was completed. The project involved resurfacing of the runway and link taxiways and the creation of a new section of airside perimeter road. New visual aids, aeronautical lighting and signage were installed. A hangar was refurbished to accommodate three Jupiter HT.1 helicopters which will be used to train pilots from all three British armed services, as part of the UK Military Flying Training System (UKMFTS). On 20 March 2018 a BAE Systems Hawk of the Red Arrows aerobatic team crashed, killing Corporal Jonathan Bayliss, an engineer. The pilot, Flight Lieutenant David Stark, survived and was treated in hospital for non-life-threatening injuries.

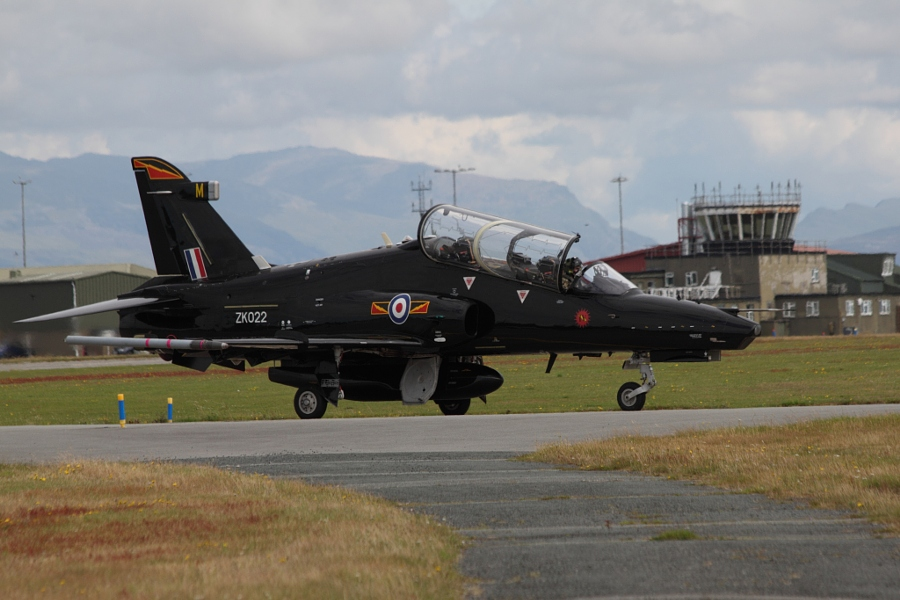
A BAE Systems Hawk T.2 of No. 4 Squadron at RAF Valley.

Due to increased demand for RAF and Royal Navy pilots, No. 25 Squadron reformed at Valley on 8 September 2018. The squadron operates the Hawk T.2 alongside No. 4 Squadron as part of No. 4 Flying Training School.

On 28 November 2019, No. 72 Squadron was officially "stood up" at RAF Valley, flying the Beechcraft Texan T.1 aircraft in the basic flying training role. The squadron transitioned from Short Tucano (RAF Linton-on-Ouse) to Texan (RAF Valley) in a major investment by the UK Military Flying Training System. The squadron operates a fleet of 10 Texan T.1s, so that RAF Valley is now home to two-thirds of fast jet training, delivering both basic and advanced courses.

In May 2020, Virginia Crosbie, MP for Ynys Môn and members of the Senedd wrote to the Ministry of Defence (MoD) seeking assurance that travel to and from the base was limited to critical journeys during the COVID-19 pandemic. The MoD told the Local Democracy Reporting Service that training remained under "constant review".

On 25 May 2020 a Pilatus PC-12 landed at RAF Valley while the base was closed for maintenance work. Initially staff thought it was an emergency landing, but the pilot said he landed there "to go to the beach". When told about the lockdown and coronavirus restrictions he was reported to have replied "it was okay, because he had [the virus] two months ago". He had flown from Fairoaks Airport and had noticed RAF Valley on Google Earth and decided to land there as Wikipedia said it served civilian traffic. He left shortly after landing. The Ministry of Defence said that while civilian traffic were allowed at its sites, 24 hours notice is required to make sure it does not impact military activity. The incident was reported to the Civil Aviation Authority.

=== Indian instructors in RAF Valley ===
On 17 October 2025, the Daily Express reported that the Qualified Flying Instructors (QFI) of the Indian Air Force (IAF) are expected to train British pilots on the BAE Systems Hawk T2 fast jets from October 2026 onwards. This was reported after the visit of the UK Carrier Strike Group to India and its participation in Exercise Konkan 2025 with the Indian Navy followed by the meeting of the British Prime Minister with his Indian counterpart to sign the trade deal. The agreement was amid the shortfall of qualified pilots at the Royal Air Force. The Indian trainers would be deployed with No. 4 Flying Training School at RAF Valley.

In January 2026, an IAF officer was deployed at the Royal Air Force College Cranwell as an instructor for the first time. Similarly, an Indian Navy and an Indian Army officer remains on continuous deployment since May 2024 and May 2025 at the Britannia Royal Naval College Dartmouth and Royal Military Academy Sandhurst. On 12 February, during the 19th UK-India Air Staff Talks in New Delhi, a letter of agreement was signed for the deployment of three QFI of the Indian Air Force at RAF Valley to impart fast jet training to British pilots for two years. They will instruct on Hawk T2 or Beechcraft Texan T.1. During the tenures, the instructors shall remain under the Indian command while working for RAF commanders on instructional duties.

The joining of three Indian QFIs at RAF Valley was announced by the Indian Air Force on 11 September 2026. The deployment of the team, led by a Squadron Leader-ranked officer, will initially span two years.

== Role and operations ==
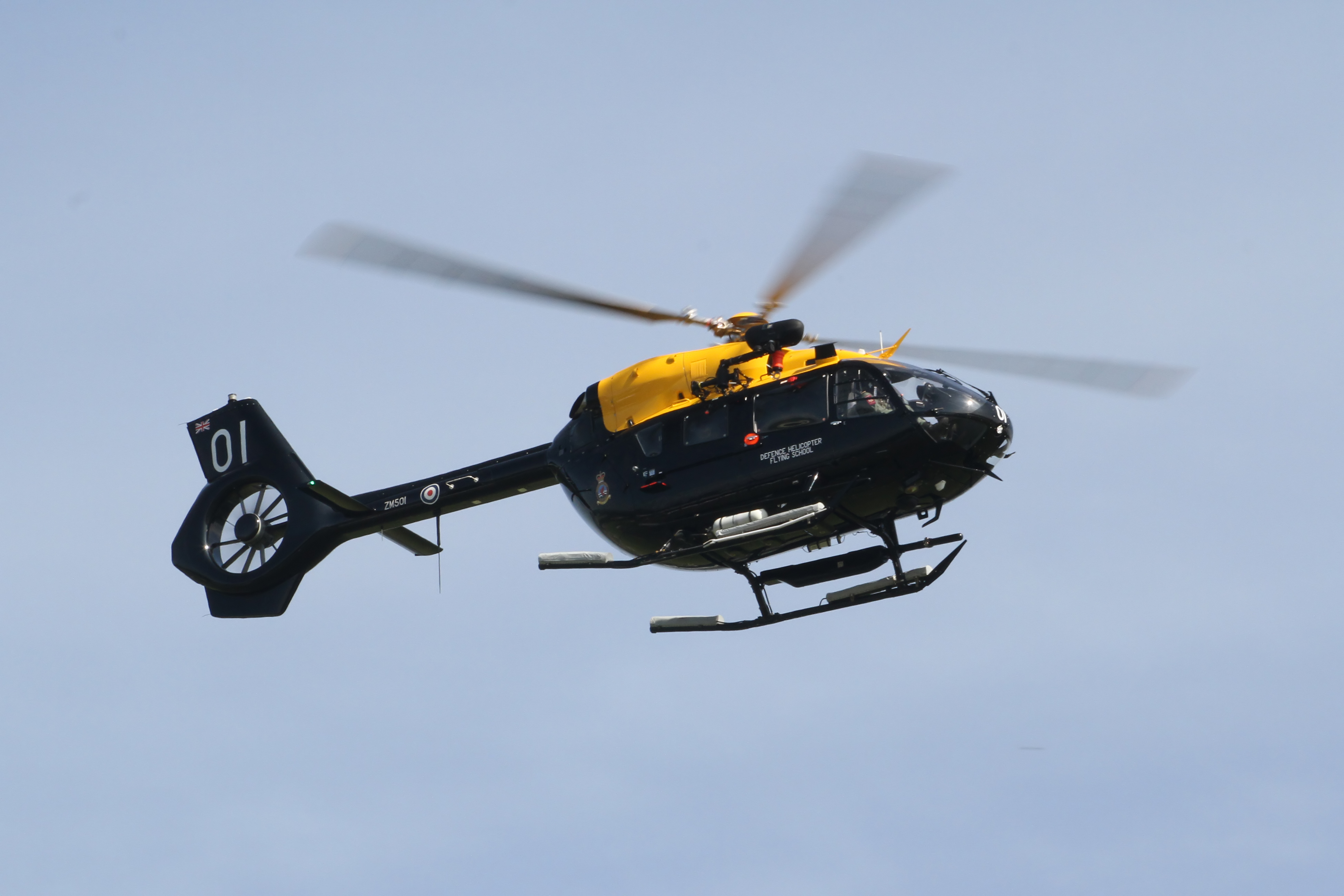
An Airbus Jupiter HT.1 of No. 202 Squadron part of No. 1 Flying Training School.

No. 4 Flying Training School (No. 4 FTS) trains RAF and Royal Navy pilots to fly fast jets, prior to training on an Operational Conversion Unit. No. 4 FTS consist of three units, No. 72 Squadron, No. 4 Squadron and No. 25 Squadron, flying the Texan T.1 and BAE Systems Hawk T.2.

The base is also home to No. 202 Squadron, part of No.1 Flying Training School, flying three Airbus Jupiter HT.1. The squadron trains RAF and Royal Navy students on maritime and mountain flying training and those who are destined for the Royal Navy's anti-submarine warfare Merlin or Wildcat.

== Based units ==
Flying and notable non-flying units based at RAF Valley.

No. 22 Group RAF

- No. 4 Flying Training School
  - Headquarters No. 4 Flying Training School
  - No. 4 Squadron – BAE Systems Hawk T.2
  - No. 25 Squadron – BAE Systems Hawk T.2
  - No. 72 Squadron – Beechcraft Texan T.1
- No.1 Flying Training School
  - No. 202 Squadron – Airbus Jupiter HT.1

No. 85 (Expeditionary Logistics) Wing

- RAF Mountain Rescue Service
  - Headquarters RAF Mountain Rescue Service
  - RAF Valley Mountain Rescue Team

== Civilian airport ==
The National Assembly for Wales announced on 21 February 2007 that public service obligation (PSO) flights would be launched from RAF Valley in April 2007, connecting north Wales with Cardiff International Airport. Flights from RAF Valley to Cardiff stopped after the first set of government COVID-19 pandemic restrictions in March 2020. On 8 June 2022, the Welsh Government axed the service, leaving the purpose-built civilian airport terminal disused.

== See also ==
- List of Royal Air Force stations
