= No. 1564 Flight RAF =

- Active: 1 Feb 1943 – 15 Jun 1946; 14 Aug 1963 – 31 Dec 1966; 1 May 1969 – 31 Mar 1970; 20 Aug 1983 – 22 May 1986; Nov 2007 – Mar 2016
- Country: United Kingdom
- Branch: Royal Air Force
- Role: Search and Rescue

Insignia
- Flight Badge: No known badge
- Flight Codes: Since 1984 the helicopters of the flight are coded SA, SB and SC

No. 1564 Flight RAF was an independent flight of the British Royal Air Force which was created on five occasions from 1943 to 2016 in a variety of roles.

== 1564 (Meteorological) Flight in World War II ==
No. 1564 (Meteorological) Flight was first formed at RAF Mellaha, near Tripoli, Libya, on 1 February 1943, flying Hawker Hurricanes and Supermarine Spitfires, and was disbanded at Istres, France on 15 June 1946.

== 1564 (Helicopter) Flight in the 1960s ==
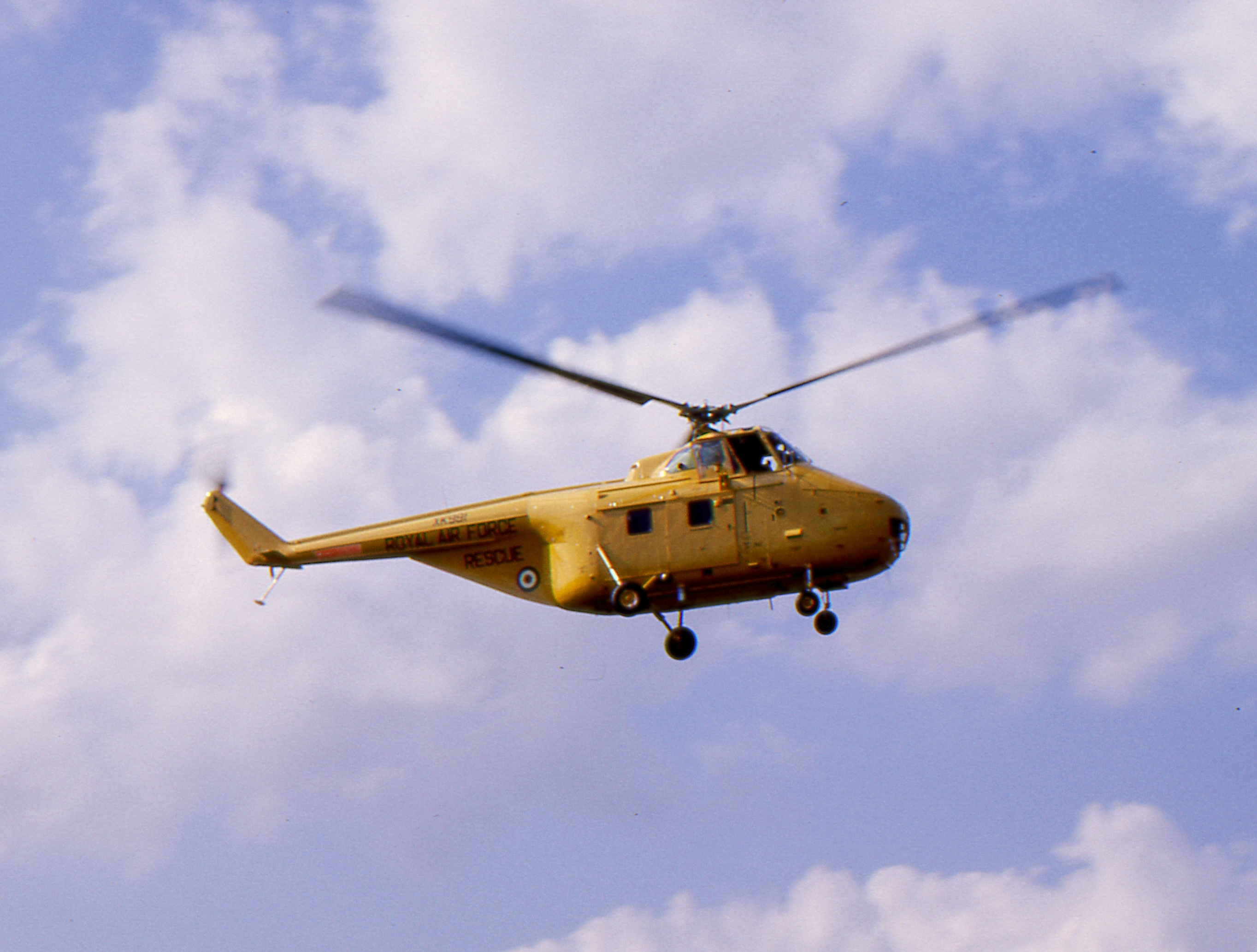
A Westland Whirlwind HAR.10 like those of 1564 Flight

No. 1564 (Helicopter) Flight was re-formed at RAF El Adem, Libya on 14 August 1963, flying Bristol Sycamores and Westland Whirlwinds, from an element of 103 Squadron, disbanding on 31 December 1966 at El Adem.

The flight was re-formed at El Adem again on 1 May 1969, from 'D' Flight of 202 Squadron, only to be disbanded again on 31 March 1970 on Cyprus.

== 1564 (Tactical Support) Flight on the Falklands ==
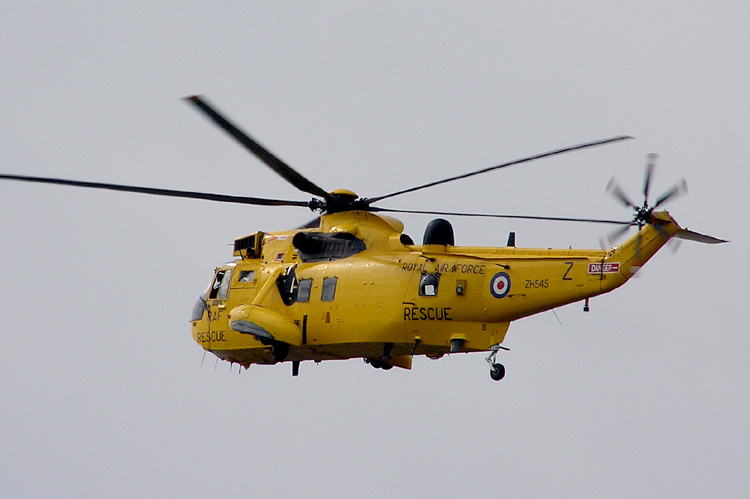
A Westland Sea King HAR.3 of No. 22 Squadron RAF, like those of 1564 Flight

Following the Falklands War of 1982, the Westland Sea King search and rescue aircraft of C Flight, 202 Squadron, RAF Coltishall were deployed to provide search and rescue cover for BFFI (British Forces Falkland Islands), flying from Navy Point opposite Port Stanley. The unit had a variety of designations before formally adopting No. 1564 (Tactical Support) Flight as its title in 1983. When the Sea King and Chinook units in the Falkland Islands were combined on the opening of RAF Mount Pleasant, they took on the title of 78 Squadron.

1564 Flight was reformed in November 2007, by re-designating 78 Squadron on the departure of the Chinook aircraft from the Falklands. The Flight operated two Sea King HAR3 helicopters, with crews provided on rotation from Nos. 22 and 202 Squadrons in the UK. The Sea Kings, however, were replaced due to the SAR privatization process. AAR Corp was awarded a contract for helicopter search and rescue services in the Falkland Islands to replace 1564 Flight, they will use AgustaWestland AW189 helicopters in the role from 2016.

In March 2015, the UK announced that a pair of Chinooks would be stationed in the Falklands again.

1564 Flight disbanded on 31 March 2016 with a simple ceremony and flypast, following the privatisation of UK SAR. This represented the final ever flight of the RAF SAR Sea Kings by ZE370 and XZ593. Since official records began in 1983, the SAR operating from the Falklands have responded to 1,305 callouts and given life-saving assistance to 1,883 people.

== Aircraft operated ==
Aircraft operated by no. 1564 Flight RAF, data from
| From | To | Aircraft | Version | Example |
|---|---|---|---|---|
| 1 February 1943 | July 1945 | Hawker Hurricane | Mk.I | Z4855 |
| 1 February 1943 | July 1945 | Hawker Hurricane | Mk.IIb | KZ134 |
| 1 February 1943 | July 1945 | Hawker Hurricane | Mk.IIc | LD209 |
| 1 February 1943 | July 1945 | Hawker Hurricane | Mk.IId | HV590 |
| July 1945 | 15 June 1946 | Supermarine Spitfire | Mk.Vc | EF683 |
| July 1945 | 15 June 1946 | Supermarine Spitfire | Mk.IX | MA518 |
| 14 August 1963 | 1 November 1963 | Bristol Sycamore | HAR.14 | XL824 |
| 1 November 1963 | 31 December 1966 | Westland Whirlwind | HAR.10 | XP354 |
| 1 May 1969 | 31 March 1970 | Westland Whirlwind | HAR.10 | XP300, XJ764 |
| 20 August 1983 | 22 May 1986 | Westland Sea King | HAR.3 | XZ597 SC |
| November 2007 | 31 March 2016 | Westland Sea King | HAR.3 | XZ597 SC |

== Flight bases ==
Bases and airfields used by no. 1564 Flight RAF, data from
| From | To | Base |
|---|---|---|
| 1 February 1943 | 14 December 1943 | RAF Mellaha, Libya |
| 14 December 1943 | 14 January 1946 | RAF Castel Benito, Libya |
| 14 January 1946 | 15 June 1946 | FAF Istres, France |
| 14 August 1963 | 31 December 1966 | RAF El Adem, Libya |
| 1 May 1969 | January 1970 | RAF El Adem, Libya |
| January 1970 | 31 March 1970 | RAF Akrotiri, Cyprus |
| 20 August 1983 | 22 May 1986 | RAF Navy Point, Falkland Islands |
| November 2007 | 31 March 2016 | RAF Mount Pleasant, Falkland Islands |

== See also ==
- RAF Search and Rescue Force
- List of Royal Air Force aircraft independent flights
- Military of the Falkland Islands
