= No. 202 Squadron RAF =

Flying squadron of the Royal Air Force

- Squadron badge
- Active: Royal Naval Air Service; 17 October 1914 – 1 April 1918; Royal Air Force; 1 April 1918 – 22 January 1920; 9 April 1920 – 16 May 1921; 1 January 1929 – 12 June 1945; 1 October 1946 – 31 July 1964; 1 September 1964 – 18 February 2016: May 2016 – present
- Country: United Kingdom
- Branch: Royal Air Force
- Type: Flying squadron
- Role: Search and rescue training
- Part of: Defence Helicopter Flying School
- Home station: RAF Valley
- Mottos: Semper vigilate (Latin for 'Be Always Vigilant')
- Aircraft: Airbus Helicopters Jupiter HT.1

Commanders
- Current commander: Squadron Leader Simon Allen

Insignia
- Squadron badge heraldry: A mallard alighting. Approved by King George VI in March 1937.
- Squadron codes: JU (Allocated Apr 1939 – Sep 1939, no evidence of use); TQ (Sep 1939 – Aug 1943); AX (May 1941 – Aug 1943); TJ (Jul 1944 – Jun 1945); Y3 (Oct 1946 – Apr 1951); A (Apr 1951 – 1956)

No. 202 Squadron of the Royal Air Force is the maritime and mountains training element of the No.1 Flying Training School, operating the Airbus Helicopters H145 Jupiter.

It previously operated the Sea King HAR3 in the search and rescue role at three stations in the northern half of the United Kingdom. It was originally formed as one of the first aeroplane squadrons of the Royal Naval Air Service (RNAS) before it became part of the RAF.

== History ==
=== Formation and the First World War ===
No. 202 Squadron was formed along with the entire RAF on 1 April 1918 by renumbering No. 2 Squadron of the Royal Naval Air Service (RNAS). It was originally formed as one of the first aeroplane squadrons of the RNAS on 17 October 1914. It served on the Western Front during the First World War, carrying out reconnaissance and bombing missions from bases in Belgium and France before being disbanded on 22 January 1920.

=== The interbellum ===
The squadron was reformed for a brief period between 9 April 1920 and 16 May 1921 as a fleet co-operation unit. In 1929, it was reformed when No. 481 Flight, operating the Fairey III floatplane in Malta was re-numbered as No. 202 Squadron, continuing to fly patrols over the Mediterranean Sea throughout the 1930s, being re-equipped with Supermarine Scapa flying boats in 1935.

=== Second World War ===
During the Second World War, the squadron flew anti-submarine patrols from RAF Gibraltar with Saro London, Consolidated Catalina and Short Sunderland flying boats and Fairey Swordfish torpedo bombers until 1944, when it moved with its Catalinas to RAF Castle Archdale, Northern Ireland, disbanding there on 12 June 1945.

=== Post-war ===
==== Weather Reconnaissance ====
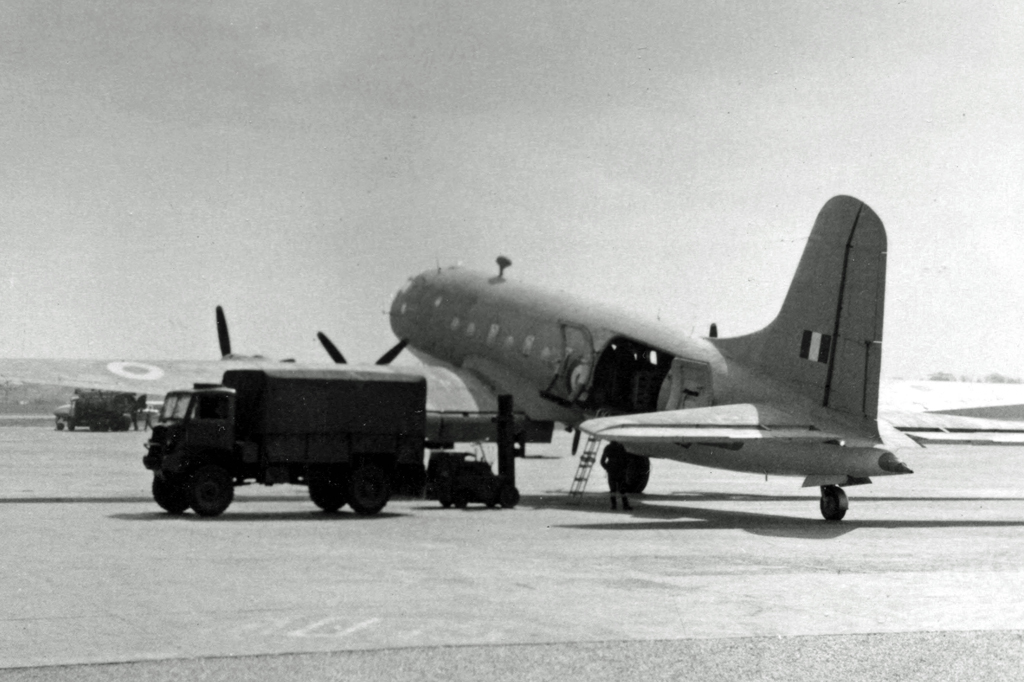
Handley Page Hastings Met Mk.1 of 202 Squadron wearing Coastal Command camouflage at Manchester Airport in 1954

No. 202 Squadron was reformed by the re-numbering of No. 518 Squadron as a weather reconnaissance squadron at RAF Aldergrove near Belfast on 1 October 1946, flying converted Handley Page Halifax GR.6 & A.9 bombers on long-range meteorological flights over the North Atlantic (codenamed "Bismuth"). It re-equipped with the more modern Handley Page Hastings Met.1 from November 1950, continuing in this role until disbanding on 31 July 1964.

==== Search and Rescue ====
Reformed on 1 September 1964 by the renumbering of No. 228 Squadron at RAF Leconfield in Yorkshire, the squadron began operating in a new helicopter search and rescue role using the Westland Whirlwind HAR.10, with flights based at RAF Acklington and RAF Ouston in Northumberland, RAF Coltishall in Norfolk and RAF Leuchars in Fife. The squadron moved to RAF Finningley during September 1976 with flights at RAF Boulmer in Northumberland, RAF Leconfield, RAF Coltishall, RAF Lossiemouth in Moray and RAF Brawdy in Pembrokeshire. The squadron re-equipped with Westland Sea King HAR3 from July 1978, but operated the Westland Wessex HAR2 as an interim measure whilst its Sea Kings were involved in the Falklands War of 1982. On the closure of Finningley in 1996 the squadron moved its headquarters to Boulmer and later in April 2008 to RAF Valley in Anglesley.

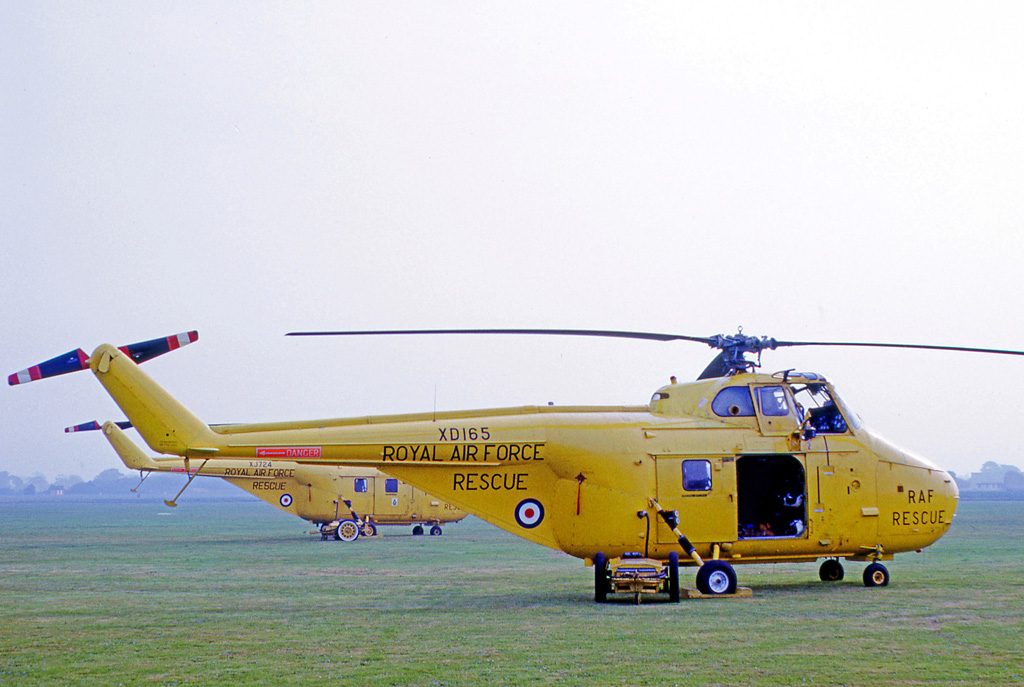
Westland Whirlwind HAR.10 of 202 Squadron at RAF Coltishall in 1971

The primary role of RAF search and rescue was the recovery of downed military aviators, however in peacetime, its aircraft were available for use in civilian distress incidents. Over 95% of the rescues carried out by the squadron were civilian incidents. Rescues included a wide variety of incidents involving casualties from aircraft, fishing trawlers, ferries, oil rigs, mountainous terrain, cliffs and the waters surrounding the UK.

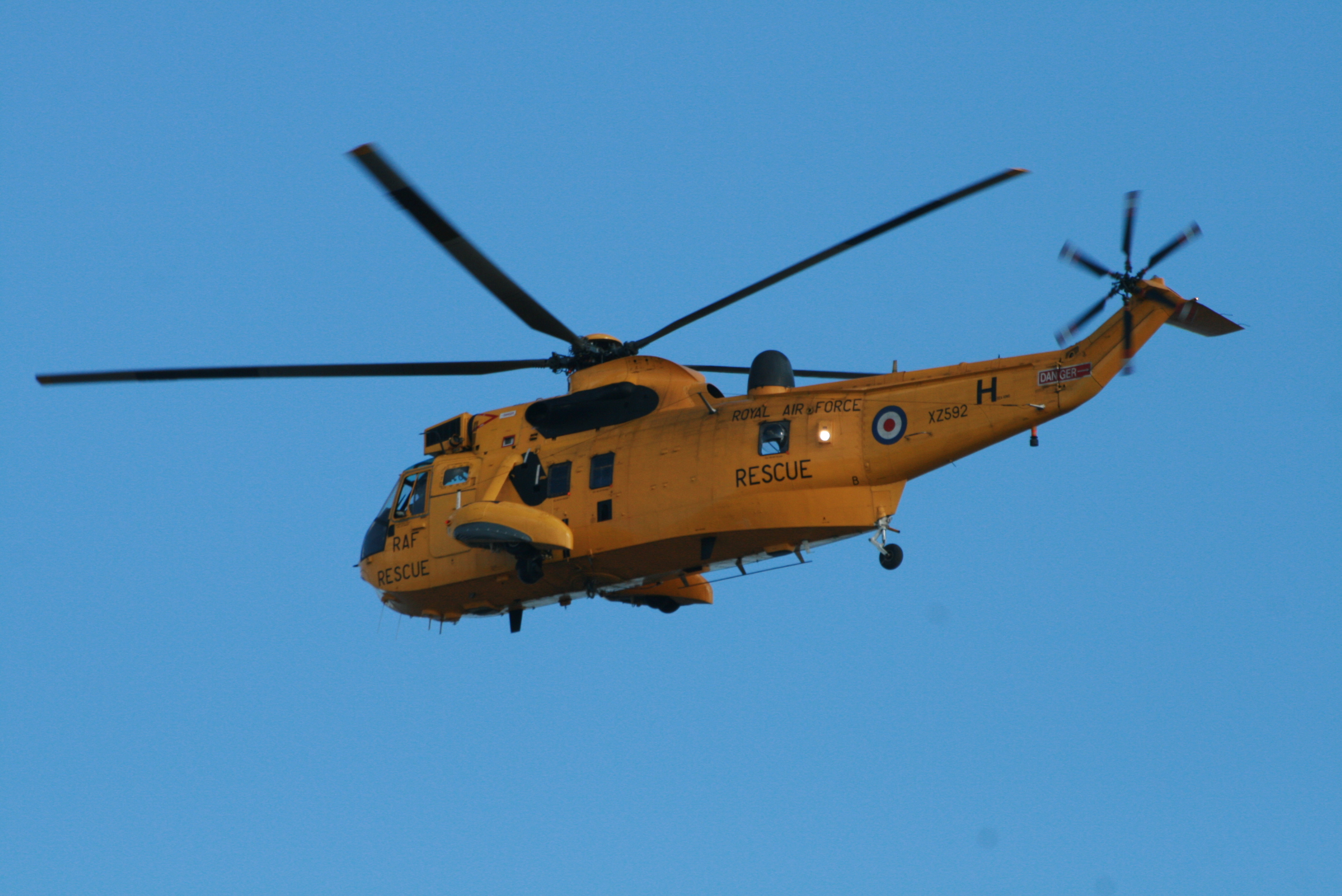
Westland Sea King helicopter of 'E' flight, No. 202 Squadron RAF at the celebrations of the Diamond Jubilee of Elizabeth II on 4 June 2012 at the Humber Bridge, Hessle, East Riding of Yorkshire.

In 2006, the government announced its intentions to privatise the search and rescue helicopter service in the UK. A ten-year contract worth £1.6 billion was signed in March 2013 with Bristow Helicopters who would run the service from 2015 with new AgustaWestland AW189 and Sikorsky S-92 helicopters. SAR helicopter operations ceased in staged handovers from March through September 2015. 'A' Flight at Boulmer ceased flying in October 2015, 'B' Flight at RAF Leconfield in March 2015 and 'D' Flight at Lossiemouth in April 2015.

=== Reformation ===
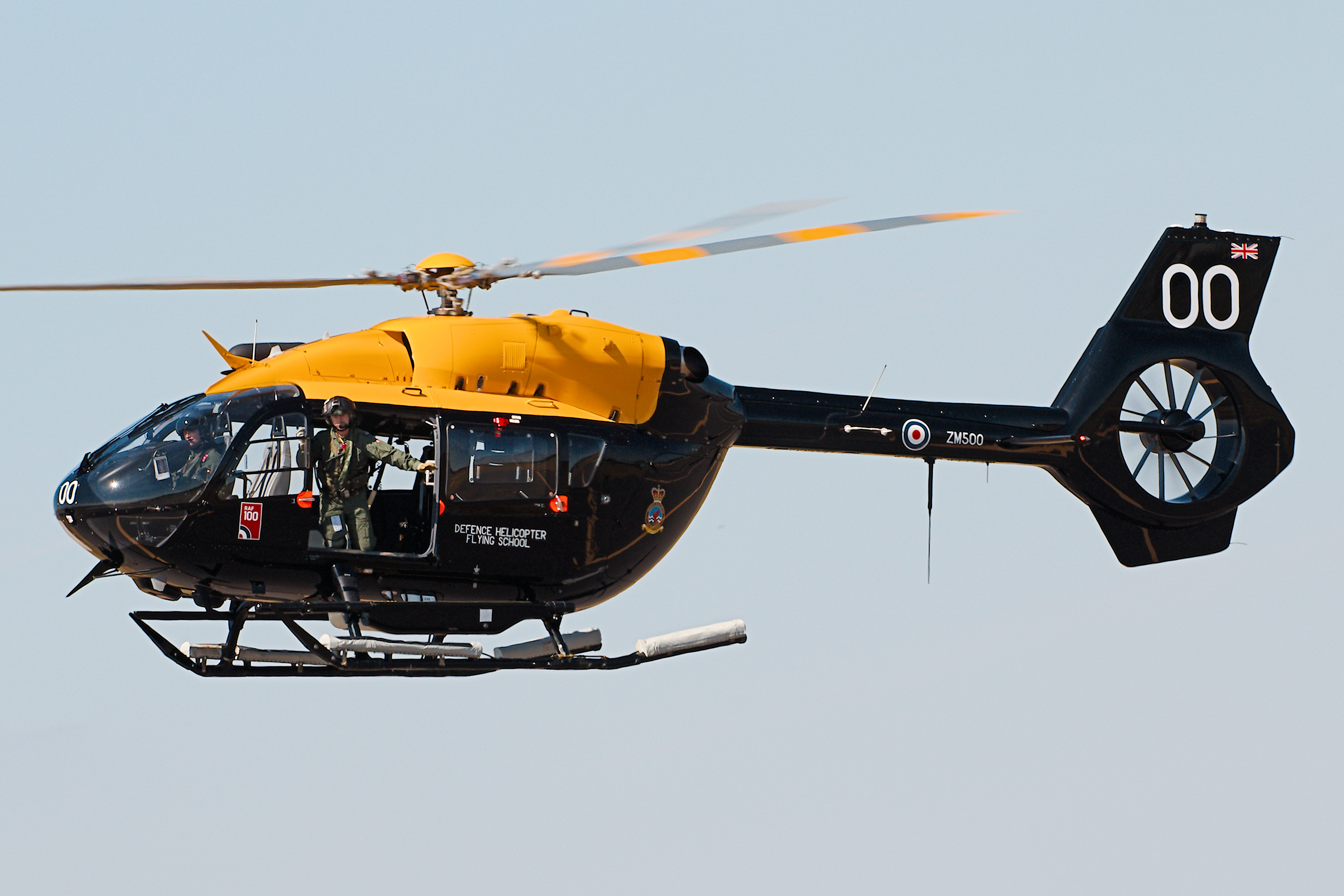
A Jupiter HT.1 currently operated by 202 Squadron.

In May 2016, the Search and Rescue Training Unit (SARTU) was renumbered 202 Squadron as the maritime and mountains training element of the Defence Helicopter Flying School based at RAF Valley and operating the Bell Griffin HT1 helicopter. After a brief pause in operations in January 2018, No. 202 Squadron was again reformed in March 2018 as the 'maritime and mountains' training Squadron of the DHFS (a UK MFTS venture) and re-equipped with the Airbus Jupiter HT1.

== Aircraft operated ==
- Royal Aircraft Factory B.E.2
- Avro 504
- Bristol Scout
- Nieuport 17
- Sopwith Pup
- Sopwith 1½ Strutter
- Farman F.40
- Short 184
- Airco DH.4
- Airco DH.9
- Fairey IIID
- Fairey IIIF
- Supermarine Scapa
- Saro London
- Consolidated Catalina
- Fairey Swordfish
- Short Sunderland
- Handley Page Halifax
- Handley Page Hastings
- Westland Whirlwind
- Westland Sea King
- Westland Wessex
- Bell Griffin HT1
- AgustaWestland AW139
- Airbus Jupiter HT1

== Battle honours ==
No. 202 Squadron has received the following battle honours. Those marked with an asterisk (*) may be emblazoned on the squadron standard.

- Western Front (1916–1918)*
- Atlantic (1939–1945)*
- Mediterranean (1940–1943)*
- North Africa (1942–1943)
- Biscay (1942–1943)*

== See also ==
- RAF Search and Rescue Force
- 22 Squadron – the other RAF Sea King SAR squadron in UK
- 771 Naval Air Squadron & HMS Gannet SAR Flight – the Royal Navy equivalents
- 1564 Flight – Sea King SAR unit in the Falkland Islands
- Rescue – a 1990 TV documentary series featuring the search and rescue activities of the squadron
