= Brize Norton 6 =

British members of Palestine Action charged with National Security Act offences

The Brize Norton 6 refers to six Palestine Action activists, Amu Gib, Lara Downes, Jony Cink, Daniel Jeronymides-Norie, Lewis Chiaramello and Muhammad Umer Khalid. They are awaiting trial on charges of criminal damage and entering a prohibited place for a purpose prejudicial to the United Kingdom, with both charges arising from a June 2025 protest at RAF Brize Norton. The incident saw activists break into the Oxfordshire air base and spray paint two RAF Voyager planes allegedly causing damage of £1.7 million.

== Context ==
The incident took place against a backdrop of increased concern and protest activity over the UK’s involvement in Israel’s military operations in Gaza, following the outbreak of the Gaza war in October 2023. In parallel with the public concern and protest activity against arms companies, there were also a number of allegations that British RAF bases were being used for flights involving the Israeli military and for British and American military operations connected with Israel.

=== RAF Brize Norton: Israeli military aircraft ===
RAF Brize Norton is the largest RAF base in the United Kingdom, and the main base for military transport and air-to-air refuelling. The Boeing C-17 Globemaster III and Airbus A400M Atlas military transport aircraft operate from the base, along with the Airbus Voyager tankers which are used for air-to-air refuelling. The Airbus Voyager fleet is operated by AirTanker Services, a joint venture comprising a number of defence companies including Airbus and Thales, and when launched was one of the world’s largest private finance initiatives.

In February 2024, investigations by Declassified UK reported that Israeli military aircraft has been landing at Brize Norton, including on flights between Israel, Britain and the United States. They specifically highlighted a flight on 25 December 2024 from Nevatim Air Base in Israel, home of Israel’s three F-35 squadrons, to RAF Brize Norton which subsequently departed to Dover AFB in the United States, home of the USAF’s 403rd airlift wing and a major Department of Defense freight terminal.

In February 2025, Declassified UK reported that there had been at least three further movements of Israeli military aircraft through RAF Brize Norton in October and November 2024, with two of the flights departing to Dover AFB and the third arriving from Dover AFB and flying the same day to Nevatim.

A subsequent investigation by Drop Site News, published in July 2025, identified nine separate visits to RAF Brize Norton by Israeli Air Force Boeing KC-707 Re’em aerial refuelling aircraft between September 2024 and June 2025. According to the article, the Re’em tankers have been seen refuelling Israeli F-35 fighter jets on bombing missions, and alleged that two of the same aircraft had provided refuelling and logistics support to Israeli fighter jets during bombing missions over Gaza.

=== RAF Akrotiri: Surveillance flights ===
RAF Akrotiri is a British military air base in Cyprus, and serves as a secondary base for the Voyager air-to-air refuelling tanker fleet, as well as housing transport aircraft, Shadow R1 reconnaissance aircraft, F-35 and Eurofighter Typhoon fighters and Unmanned Aerial Vehicles (drones). It also houses some U-2 spy planes from the United States Air Force’s 9th Strategic Reconnaissance Wing.

Since the start of the Gaza war, there have been a number of allegations of flights involving RAF planes taking place between Akrotiri and Israel, including transport flights to Tel Aviv’s Ben Gurion Airport and flights of reconnaissance planes over Gaza itself. In November 2023, Declassified UK reported that the RAF transport aircraft had made 33 flights to Tel Aviv since the start of the conflict in October 2023. In April 2025, Action on Armed Violence (AOAV) published a detailed investigative report alleging that between 3 December 2023 and 27 March 2025 the RAF flew at least 518 surveillance sorties from Akrotiri to Gaza using Shadow R1 reconnaissance planes that are equipped with target acquisition capabilities. At least one of these flights was alleged to have landed at Israel’s Nevatim Air Base. The AOAV report went on to state that the UK government had refused to disclose details about the flights, including whether any intelligence had been passed to Israel for targeting purposes.

=== RAF Marham and RAF Mildenhall: Delivery of F-35 jets and components to Israel ===
In December 2024, the UK Ministry of Defence disclosed that there had been 14 transfers of F-35 components from RAF Marham to Israel between October 2023 and September 2024. Israel's F-35 planes were responsible for the 13 July 2024 al-Mawasi attack which killed 90 Palestinian civilians.

In January 2026, Israeli press reported that the Israeli Air Force had taken delivery of three new F-35 Adir jets. The planes had been spotted landing and taking off from RAF Mildenhall on their journey from the US to Israel. In subsequent reporting by Declassified UK, the legality of this transfer of military equipment to Israel via RAF bases was questioned, with Sam Perlo-Freeman from Campaign Against Arms Trade noting that it appeared at odds with the UK Governments ban on direct shipments of F-35 exports from the UK to Israel.

== June 2025 Incident ==
On 20 June 2025, two Palestine Action activists broke into RAF Brize Norton on e-scooters and sprayed red paint on two planes. They had repurposed fire extinguishers to spray red paint, which they say symbolises the "bloodshed" in Gaza, into the turbine engines of two Airbus Voyagers and caused further damage using crowbars. Paint was also sprayed across the runway and a Palestinian flag was left on the scene. The protesters filmed the incident themselves and the footage was subsequently published on social media. A statement issued by the group said that the incident took place due to flights departing daily from the base to RAF Akrotiri in Cyprus, "a base used for military operations in Gaza and across the Middle East. Flights depart daily from the base to RAF Akrotiri in Cyprus. From Cyprus, British planes collect intelligence, refuel fighter jets and transport weapons to commit genocide in Gaza."

Palestine Action said the pair involved in the incident were not apprehended by security and that no arrests had been made at the scene.

According to Sky News, a senior RAF source claimed that the aircraft had nothing to do with Israel's war in Gaza and said that “The UK is not supporting Israeli operations and these aircraft have not been used in support of Israeli forces in any shape or form."

The Ministry of Defence condemned the incident as an act of vandalism and launched a review of security arrangements across the defence estate. Prime Minister Keir Starmer described the breach as "disgraceful", while Defence Secretary John Healey ordered an investigation into how the activists had gained access to one of the UK's most important military installations. The RAF stated that operations at the base continued following the incident.

== Reaction and subsequent events ==
=== Arrests and charges ===
Counter Terrorism Policing led the criminal investigation, citing the potential implications for national security. On 3 July 2025, four individuals were charged with conspiracy to enter a prohibited place for a purpose prejudicial to the safety or interests of the United Kingdom under the National Security Act 2023, as well as conspiracy to commit criminal damage. The fifth and sixth suspects were charged and remanded in custody in August 2025 and May 2026 respectively, pending trial, with the charges being subsequently amended to entering a prohibited place for a purpose prejudicial to the safety or interests of the United Kingdom under the National Security Act 2023, and criminal damage of greater than £5,000.

=== Proscription of Palestine Action ===
The incident prompted wider political and legal consequences. On 23 June 2025, Home Secretary Yvette Cooper announced the government's intention to proscribe Palestine Action under the Terrorism Act 2000. The proposal was subsequently approved by Parliament, making the organization a proscribed terrorist group under UK law. The decision generated debate over the distinction between direct action protest and national security while also prompting renewed scrutiny of security at UK military installations.

=== Questions over RAF base security ===
The fact that protesters were able to enter a secure RAF base caused questions to be raised by politicians across the political spectrum regarding the adequacy of security arrangements at RAF bases. Lord West, minister for UK security and former head of the Royal Navy, said the break-in was "extremely worrying" and "really a problem" for national security. Conservative leader Kemi Badenoch said the security breach was "deeply concerning". Defence Secretary John Healey said he was "really disturbed" by the incident and had ordered an investigation and the wider security review.

== See also ==
- United Kingdom and the Gaza war
- Gaza war protests in the United Kingdom
- RAF Brize Norton
- RAF Akrotiri
