= Royal Air Force Voyager Vespina =

United Kingdom principal VIP aircraft, operated by the Royal Air Force

Royal Air Force VIP Voyager KC3 ZZ336 Vespina
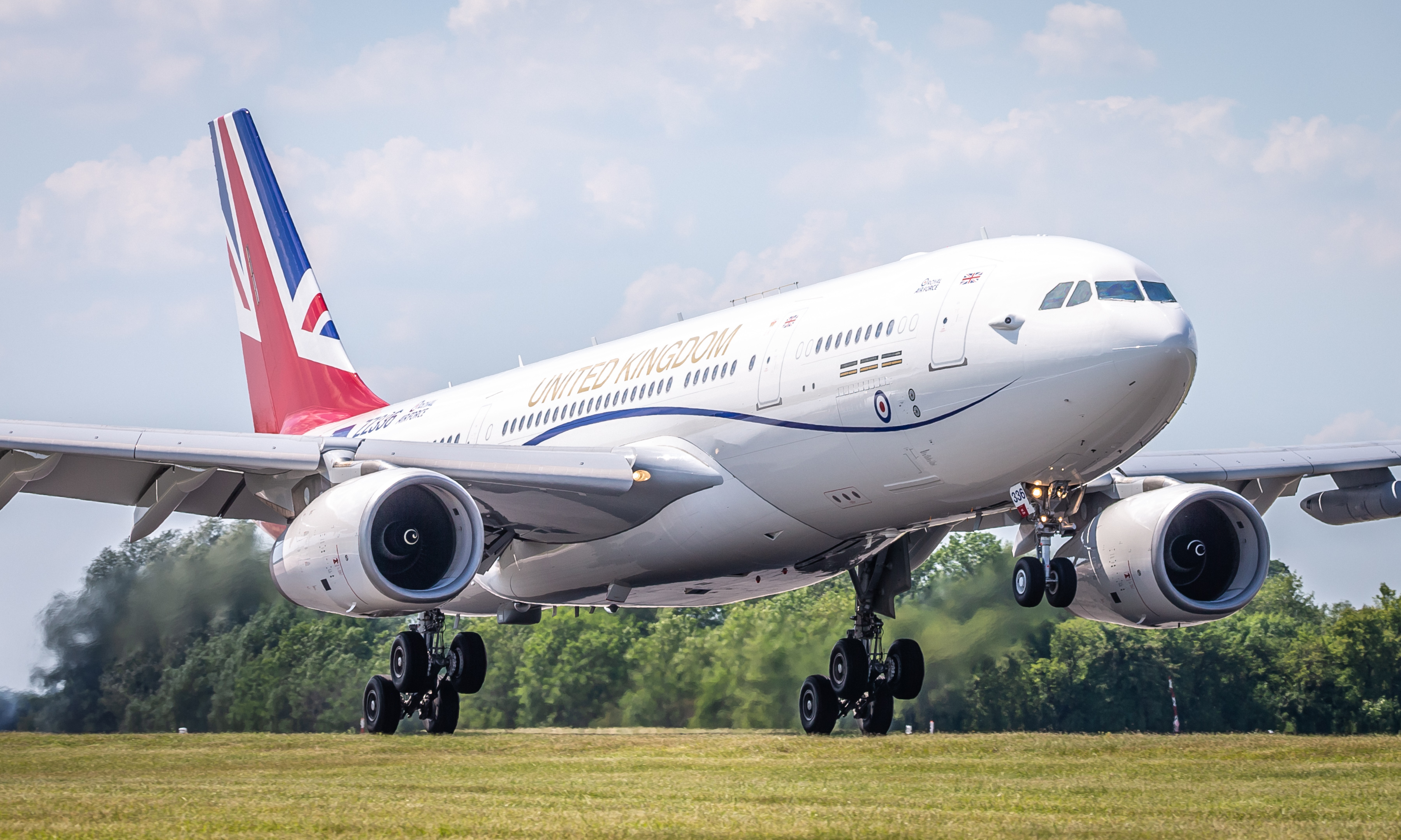
- ZZ336 Vespina in 'Global Britain' livery, June 2020

General information
- Type: Voyager KC3 (A330-243 MRTT)
- Manufacturer: Airbus Military
- Status: in service
- Owners: AirTanker Holdings
- Construction number: 1363
- Serial: ZZ336

History
- First flight: 25 October 2012; 13 years ago

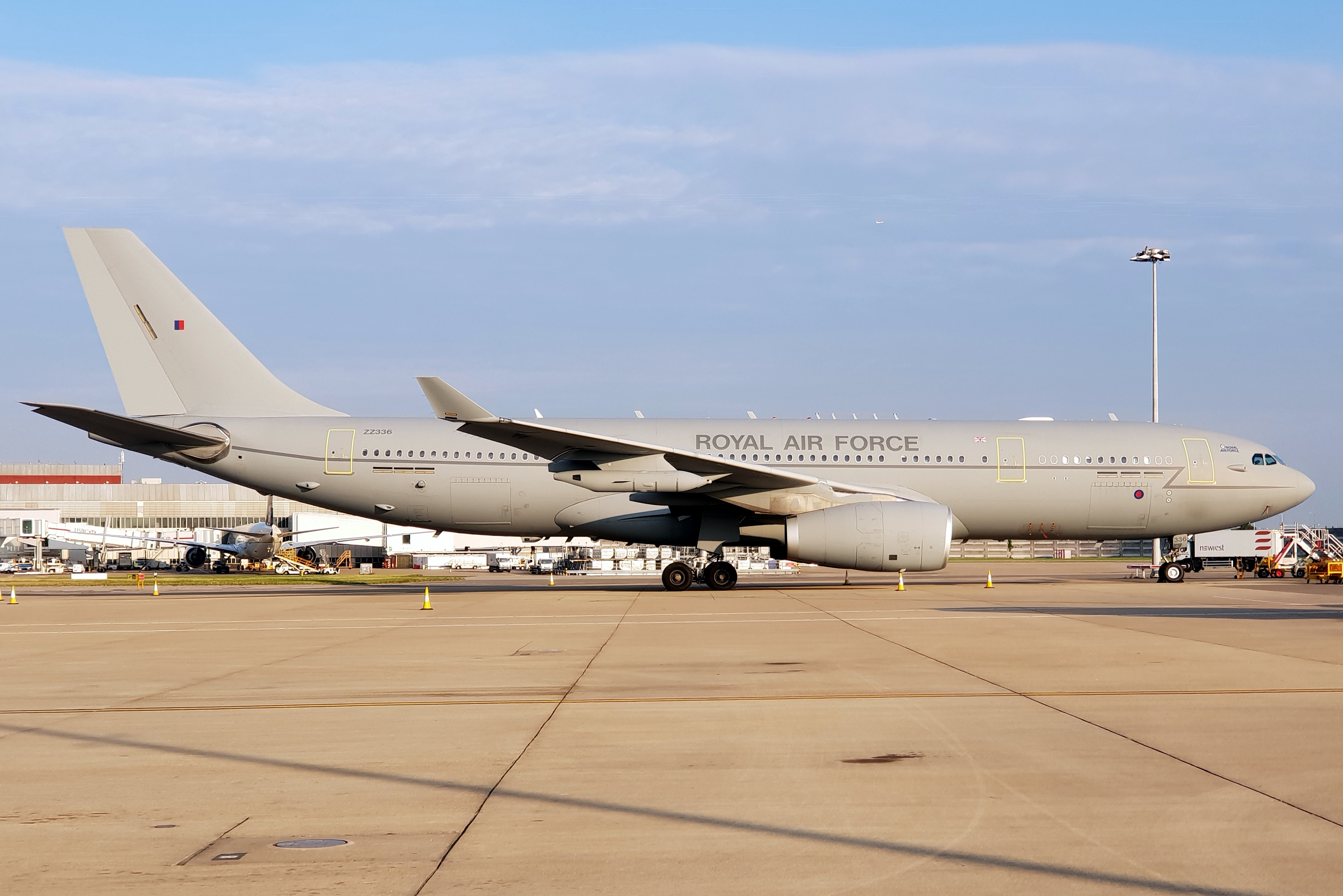
RAF Voyager KC3 ZZ336 after its VIP refit, but retaining its original low-visibility matt-grey paint scheme, 2018.

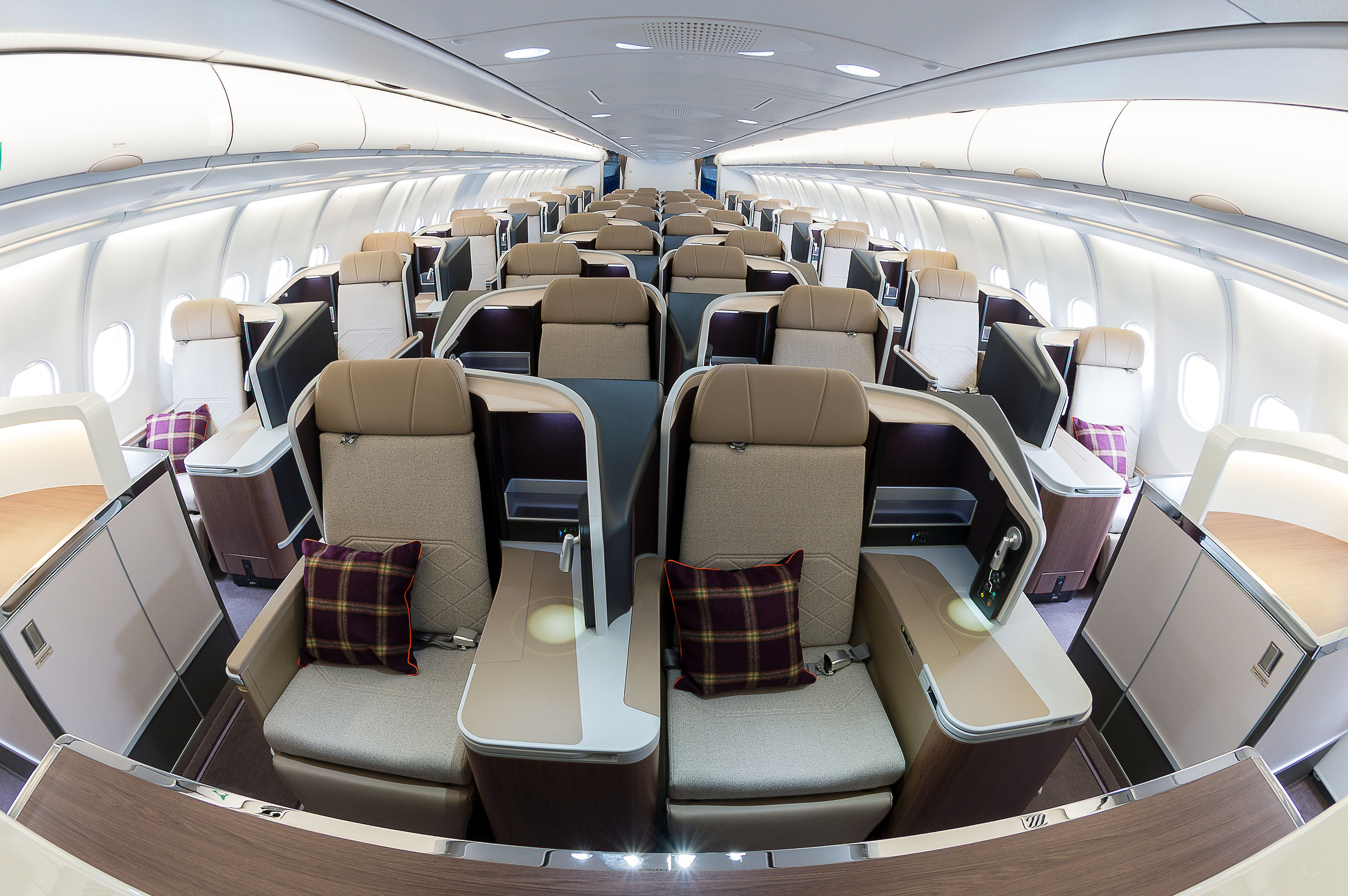
VIP interior of the RAF Voyager, 2016.

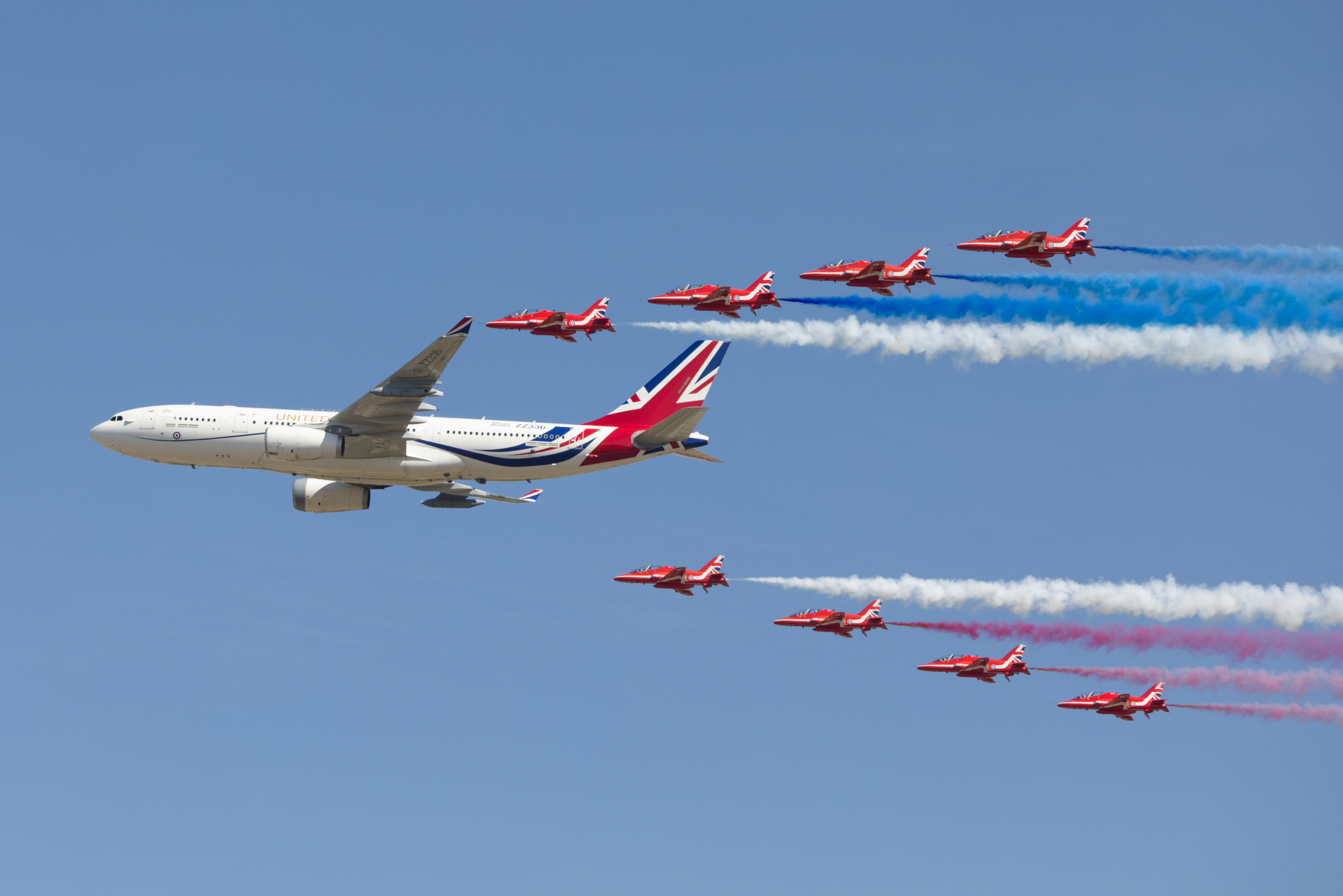
Vespina flanked by the Red Arrows at the 2022 Royal International Air Tattoo.

The Royal Air Force VIP Voyager, identified with the military aircraft registration ZZ336, and more recently named by the Royal Air Force (RAF) as Vespina since June 2020, is a customised RAF Voyager KC3 owned by AirTanker Holdings Limited and operated under lease by the Royal Air Force. It is the primary transport aeroplane for the British royal family, the Prime Minister, and British government ministers. The RAF operates a number of Voyagers which are militarised multi-role tanker transport (MRTT) aircraft; ZZ336 Vespina is a specific Voyager KC3 aircraft painted in a 'Global Britain' livery, and fitted with secure satellite communications system, missile detection, fifty-eight business-class seats (front cabin), one hundred 'premium economy' standard seats (rear cabin), and media facilities, similar to other dedicated air transports of heads of state and government.

When ZZ336 was first converted to its VIP role in 2016, its exterior was visually identical to the remainder of the RAF Voyager fleet, retaining its original military low-visibility matt-grey exterior paint scheme with standard Royal Air Force roundels, insignia, and identification markings. ZZ336 was first used in its VIP configuration on 8 July 2016. ZZ336 was named Vespina when it was returned to RAF Brize Norton on 26 June 2020 following the completion of its new gloss-white livery. The name Vespina is not used operationally; it is not used in its RAF F700 official logbook, nor is it used as its military call sign or flight number; it continues to be officially identified as ZZ336.

ZZ336 Vespina is based at RAF Brize Norton in Oxfordshire and is operated alongside the main fleet of RAF Voyagers by No. 10 Squadron RAF. Whilst on VIP duties, Vespina is operated by a typical crew of thirteen, consisting of its two flight deck crew (pilot and co-pilot) and eleven cabin crew (flight attendants and two pursers), and for non-VIP standard military operation, utilises eight cabin crew. Like all RAF Voyagers, Vespina carries a total fuel load of 111 tonnes (109 long tons; 122 short tons), being able to dispense 50,000 kilograms (110,231 pounds) to receiver aircraft via its two under-wing Cobham 905E hose and drogue refuelling pods and its centreline Cobham 805E Fuselage Refuelling Unit (FRU).

== Background ==
Proposals to provide a new dedicated VIP transport aircraft, for governmental or royal use, were first mooted in 1998 under Prime Minister Tony Blair. In mid 2006, there was a proposal for the procurement of two VIP aircraft, a 70-seat long haul aircraft and a smaller 15-seat jet for shorter distances, at a total cost of £100 million. However, in March 2008, the new Prime Minister Gordon Brown scrapped the plans for both aircraft. Instead, just one small aircraft was to be purchased, and restricted to UK-only operation, with the Queen putting forward her own plans. In March 2009, the proposal for a £7 million 12-seater private jet plan was halted due to the recession.

== RAF Voyager ==
It was not until the end of 2015 that the British Government announced as part of the Strategic Defence and Security Review 2015 (2015 SDSR) that one existing RAF Voyager aircraft, a military version of an Airbus A330-243 civilian airliner, would be converted into a VIP Voyager for use by the Royal Family, the Prime Minister, and senior government ministers. An existing Voyager KC3 (ZZ336, construction number 1363), which was originally delivered to the Royal Air Force on 30 November 2012 (following its first flight on 25 October 2012), was selected for the conversion. This conversion was completed in 2016 at a cost of £10 million, with Prime Minister David Cameron taking the aeroplane to the 2016 Warsaw summit. In June 2020, Prime Minister Boris Johnson ordered that the aeroplane be painted in a United Kingdom-themed red, white, and blue livery. This new paint scheme was designed with the assistance of Airbus, and was carried out by Marshall Aerospace and Defence at its facilities at Cambridge Airport, and returned to RAF Brize Norton on 25 June 2020. The main aim of the new colour scheme is to "promote the UK around the world while transporting Ministers, senior members of the Royal Family and their delegations on trade, diplomatic and other missions". Johnson projected that the entire rebrand would cost about £900,000.

Despite having been fitted as a VIP aircraft since 2016, and having a custom livery since 2020, the British Government and the RAF has insisted that the aeroplane will continue to serve its military purpose of air-to-air refuelling (primarily fast jets, from its two Cobham 905E under-wing hose and drogue refuelling pods, and larger transport aircraft from its centreline Cobham 805E Fuselage Refuelling Unit) and air transport and personnel trooping. According to a Freedom of Information (FOI) request on 11 August 2017 to the Ministry of Defence (MoD), ZZ336, the VIP Voyager carried out a total of 76 aerial refuelling sorties supplying both UK and foreign receiver aircraft from 12 July 2016 through to 9 August 2017, under various auspices, including 'exercise', 'transit', and 'operational'. From 14 August to 14 September 2017, ZZ336 completed seven aerial refuelling sorties. Vespina continues to refuel front-line fighter and transport aircraft of the Royal Air Force, including the Typhoon FGR4, F-35B Lightning, and A400M Atlas.

In 2021, Charles and Camilla (then Prince of Wales and Duchess of Cornwall) flew in Vespina to Jordan as part of their Royal Tour; the aircraft was powered by a blend of Sustainable Aviation Fuel (SAF).

In December 2022, Vespina was forward deployed to Al Udeid Air Base in Qatar to provide air-to-air refuelling and support air security operations by the Qatar Emiri Air Force and Royal Air Force during the 2022 FIFA World Cup. This was part of Exercise Soaring Falcon, a regular deployment by Royal Air Force assets to Qatar.

Vespina also participates in state military guard of honour flypasts in the United Kingdom, notably the 2022 Trooping the Colour which formed part of the celebrations of the Platinum Jubilee of Elizabeth II, and sometimes forms the lead part of a formation along with the Royal Air Force Aerobatic Team, commonly known as the Red Arrows, a role most notably previously undertaken by a Concorde of British Airways.

== See also ==
- Number 32 (The Royal) Squadron, RAF
- Titan Airways — private charter company that operates a similarly liveried Airbus A321neo for the UK Government
- Air transport of the British royal family and government
- Air transports of heads of state and government
