= AirTanker Services =

British airline and aircraft leasing company

AirTanker Services Limited

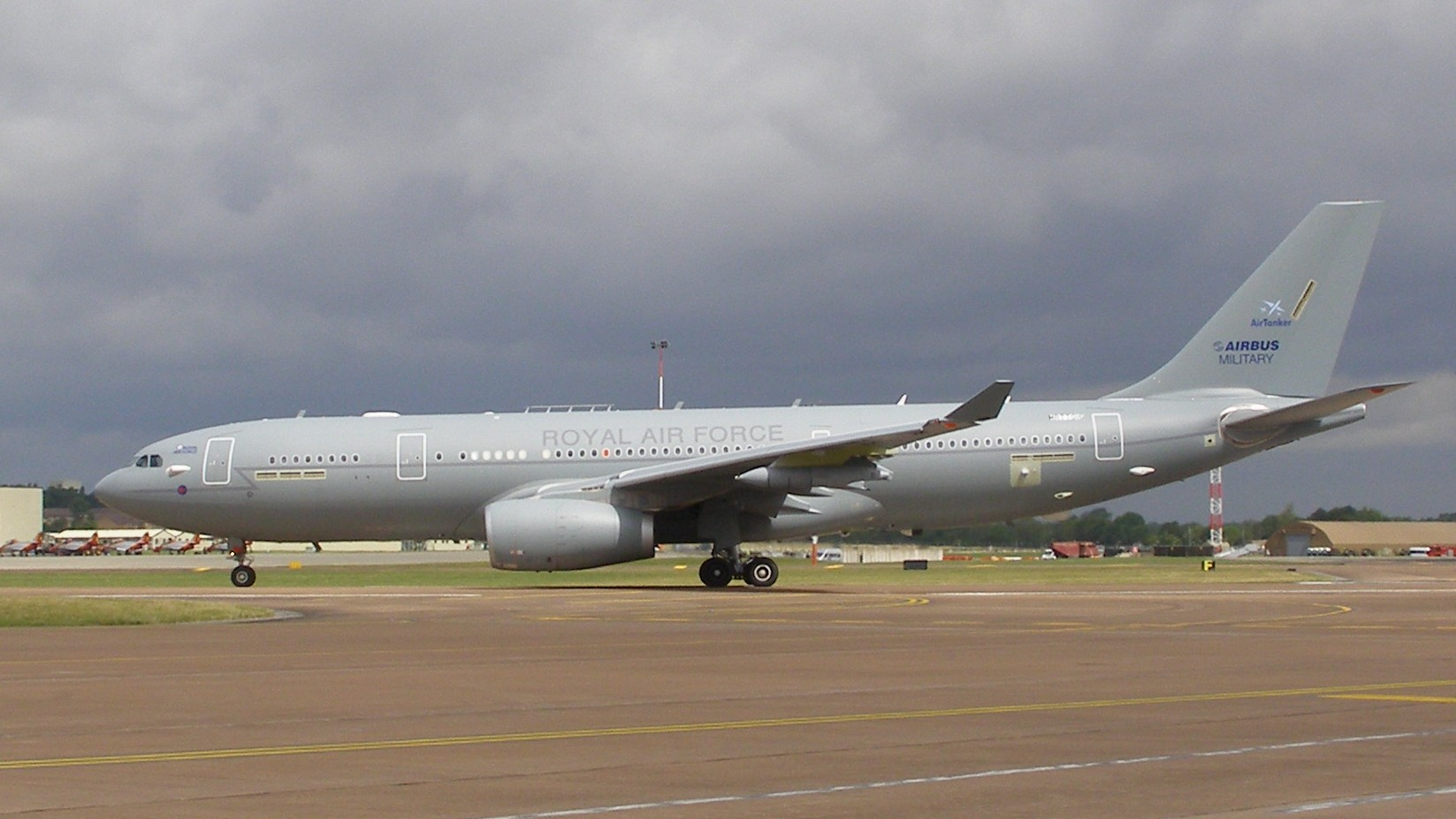
- Early aircraft displaying AirTanker and Airbus Military logos on its tail fin
IATA	ICAO	Call sign
9L	TOW	TOWLINE
- Founded: 14 June 2007; 19 years ago
- Commenced operations: January 2012; 14 years ago
- AOC #: 2388
- Operating bases: military: RAF Brize Norton; RAF Akrotiri; RAF Mount Pleasant
- Focus cities: civilian: Manchester Airport
- Fleet size: 14x Airbus A330 MRTT (A330-243)
- Parent company: AirTanker Holdings Limited
- Headquarters: RAF Brize Norton, Carterton, Oxfordshire, United Kingdom
- Key people: Phill Blundell (CEO)
- Revenue: ▼£156.3 million (2020)
- Net income: ▼£213,000 (2020)
- Profit: ▼£54 million (2020)
- Total equity: £64.4 million (2020)
- Employees: 689 (2020)
- Website: AirTanker.co.uk

Notes
- original AirTanker Services Ltd consortium partners: Airbus Group (40%); Rolls-Royce plc (20%); Cobham plc (13.33%); Babcock International (13.33%); Thales Group (13.33%)

AirTanker Services Limited, incorporated in England and Wales in 2007, is a private limited company in the United Kingdom (UK), which operates a British airline known as AirTanker (IATA: 9L, ICAO: TOW, call sign: TOWLINE), and is also an aircraft leasing and operating company.

Under contract to the Government of the United Kingdom, AirTanker Holdings Limited owns a fleet of fourteen Airbus A330 MRTT multi-role tanker transport aircraft (based upon existing civilian A330-243 wide-body passenger airliner (type code A332), retro-converted to military specification by Airbus Military, now part of Airbus Defence and Space) primarily for military operations by the Royal Air Force (RAF). In turn, AirTanker Services Limited operate those fourteen aircraft for the Royal Air Force, known by the British military service name Voyager, as the RAF's now sole type of tanker aircraft for aerial refuelling, whilst simultaneously being able to operate as military troop and cargo transport, and also configurable for military aeromedical roles. For additional revenue, AirTanker Services Limited is able to operate as a civilian airline named AirTanker (identified by ICAO code: TOW), using any reserve aircraft on short-term air charter, or longer-term damp-lease or wet lease arrangements to other civilian airlines for commercial gain.

== History ==
=== 2008-2015: Initial concept and launch ===
In March 2008, the Ministry of Defence (MoD) signed the finalised Future Strategic Tanker Aircraft (FSTA) contract with AirTanker Holdings Limited (ATH) (the legal owner of the aircraft) to provide the Royal Air Force (RAF) with an air transport and air-to-air refuelling capability. The Future Strategic Tanker Aircraft contract stipulated the supply of fourteen Airbus A330 MRTT (A330-243), with all fourteen airframes being converted to the full Multi-Role Tanker Transport (MRTT) tanker specification. This new capability was to provide a modern replacement for the RAF's then ageing fleet of aerial refuelling tankers; namely the Vickers VC10 and Lockheed TriStar. In addition to its primary role of supporting the RAF, AirTanker Services Limited (ATS) (the legal operator of the civilian AirTanker airline) also holds a UK Civil Aviation Authority (CAA) Type A Global operating licence, permitting it to operate as revenue-generating civilian airline; capable of carrying fare-paying passengers, cargo, and mail, on aircraft with twenty or more seats.

Prior to the delivery of the aircraft to the RAF, new facilities were constructed RAF Brize Norton in Oxfordshire, the RAF's largest airbase. Known as AirTanker Hub, these facilities are owned by industry, and act as headquarters and registered office for both ATH and ATS, and contain all support services for operation and maintenance of the AirTanker fleet.

In accordance with the dual military and civilian roles, all fourteen aircraft in the fleet must be able to switch between the UK's Civil Aircraft Register, and its Military Aircraft Register. They are thus dual registered, although only one type of registration mark is displayed, dependent on its operator.

On 12 May 2012, sponsored reservists (members of the RAF, but salaried by commercial companies) of No. 10 Squadron for AirTanker Services began RAF operations of its Airbus A330 MRTT, known by the RAF as the Voyager, by operating a military air transport sortie to RAF Akrotiri in Cyprus from its home airbase of RAF Brize Norton.

Following the issue of an air operating licence by the CAA, the airline flew its first charter flight to RAF Akrotiri in Cyprus for the MoD in January 2013. After delays in certification due to issues with its refuelling drogue baskets, its first operational aerial refuelling flight took place on 20 May 2013; 13 years ago. Following subsequent successful Voyager tanker aerial fuel delivery operations to all operational RAF, and allied receiver aircraft, in late 2013, No. 101 Squadron RAF retired all their remaining Vickers VC10s and became the second RAF squadron alongside 10 Squadron to operate the Voyager.

Since October 2013, AirTanker has operated the twice-weekly South Atlantic Air Bridge between RAF Brize Norton and RAF Mount Pleasant in the Falkland Islands, a distance of more than 7,900 miles (6,900 nautical miles; 12,700 kilometres), using a demilitarised Airbus Voyager. The service primarily transports military personnel, contractors and freight, although civilian passengers may also book seats. The route normally includes a refuelling stop at RAF Ascension Island. When Ascension's runway became unavailable between 2019 and 2023, refuelling was temporarily conducted in Cape Verde and later Blaise Diagne International Airport in Dakar during the COVID-19 pandemic, before returning to Ascension following runway repairs.

From late 2014, up to two AirTanker Holdings RAF Voyager KC3 aircraft operated by the RAF have been involved in combat missions in support of Operation Shader. They are tasked for tanker sorties supplying fuel to RAF Eurofighter Typhoon FGR4s and other probe-equipped coalition receiver aircraft. These Voyagers are assigned to No. 903 Expeditionary Air Wing based at RAF Akrotiri in Cyprus.

=== 2015-present: Diversification and civilian partnerships ===
In May 2015, AirTanker Holdings leased one de-modified and demilitarised A330-243 aircraft to Thomas Cook Airlines to be deployed on holiday routes. The contract ran for three years, and involved mainly long-haul flights from Glasgow Airport, Manchester Airport and London Stansted Airport. The first commercial flight took place on 1 May 2015, from Manchester to Cancun in Mexico and Punta Cana in the Dominican Republic. In April 2017, a second aircraft was also leased to Thomas Cook Airlines and in May 2019 another was leased to Jet2.com, following a different aircraft being leased to Jet2.com in June 2017.

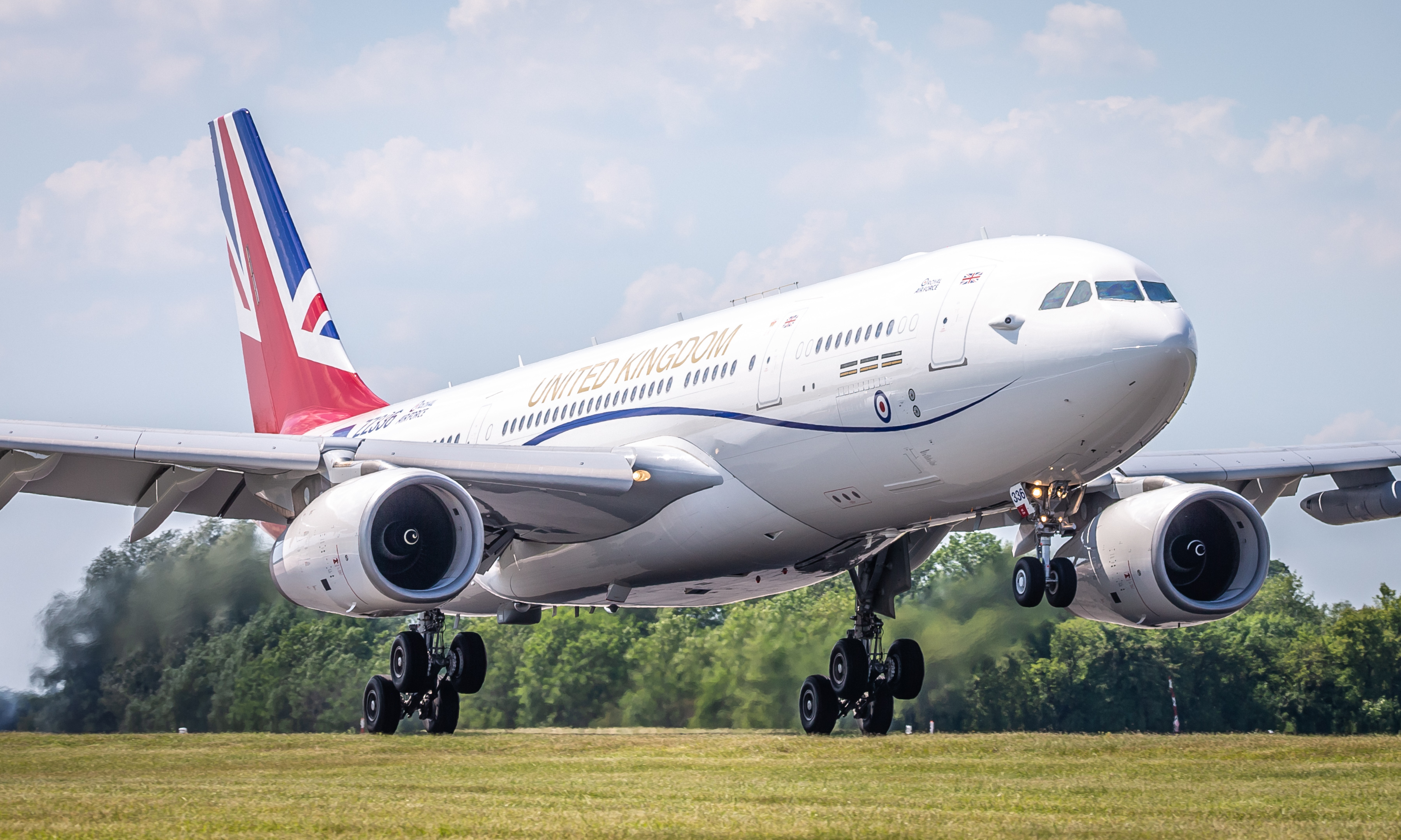
ZZ336 Vespina, the Royal Air Force's VIP Voyager KC3 returns to RAF Brize Norton following completion of programmed mid-life major servicing and her new 'Global Britain' gloss-white livery, June 2020.

During early 2016, RAF Voyager KC3 aircraft (ZZ336) was further converted to VIP fitment for use by members of the British Royal Family, the Prime Minister, and senior members of the UK Government. Whilst still retaining its original core military function of aerial refuelling tanker and military transport, the aircraft's passenger cabin was reconfigured to include fifty-eight business class seats up front in a dual-aisle one-two-one configuration, retaining one-hundred premium economy standard-class seats in the standard two-four-two configuration rear cabin. The VIP upgrade also included secure satellite communications system, missile detection, secure weapons storage, and media facilities, similar to other dedicated air transports of heads of state and government. This aircraft originally retained its military low-visibility matt-grey exterior paint scheme, identical to the remainder of the Voyager KC2 and KC3 fleet. During mid-2020, as part of its programmed mid-life upgrades and major servicing, it was repainted in gloss-white 'Global Britain' livery, which includes a stylised Union Jack on its tail fin and winglets, gold United Kingdom lettering, but retaining its Royal Air Force name, RAF roundels, and prominent military aircraft registration. When returned to service, it was given the name Vespina by the RAF.

On 13 June 2016 AirTanker Holdings delivered the final aircraft to the RAF.

In 2017, AirTanker Services established a new operating base at Manchester Airport to support its AirTanker civilian leasing operations for its de-modified demilitarised A330-243 aircraft. The same year, members of AirTankers' cabin crew were seconded to Thomas Cook Airlines, fostering its existing relationship and facilitating training of A330 cabin crew for Thomas Cook Airlines.

In 2022, AirTanker Services was awarded a contract by Airbus Defence and Space, on behalf of the European Defence Agency, who are the operator of the Multinational MRTT Fleet (MMF), for its fleet of Airbus A330 MRTT as used by six NATO partner nations. This was to provide engineering support services to the Netherlands-based, but Luxembourg-registered Multinational MRTT Fleet. The contract agreement is for a work share between AirTanker and Airbus for three specific support services; these include Rolls-Royce Trent 772B-60 engine support, Cobham flight refuelling pod support, and maintenance.

In June 2025, the MoD announced the award of a £170 million contract to AirTanker Services for a major upgrade to the Voyager tanker aircraft fleet. The upgrade, known as the Voyager Operating System Evolution (VOSE), would cover the design, development, certification, and through-life support of a new mission system for the RAF’s Future Strategic Tanker Aircraft (FSTA). The work is expected to be carried out at RAF Brize Norton.

== Corporate affairs ==
AirTanker Services and AirTanker Holdings are both owned by a consortium (in varying percentage stakes for each company); consisting of Airbus, Rolls-Royce plc (23.5% ATS, and previously 23.1% ATH), Equitix Investment Management Limited (23.1% ATH), Cobham plc, Babcock International, and Thales Group. Both companies have their headquarters and registered office at the AirTanker Hub, RAF Brize Norton, Oxfordshire.

== Personnel and support ==
AirTanker Holdings owns the entire fleet of fourteen Airbus A330-243 aircraft under the terms of its contract with the UK government. AirTanker Services operate the aircraft, and also provides full support infrastructure to service and maintain the aircraft fleet, operational management, personnel training, and some specific aircraft crews. For RAF operations (identified by its ICAO airline designator: RAF), this latter includes military pilots and engineers who are classed as 'Sponsored Reservists'.

Its surge fleet, the de-modified demilitarised A330-243 aircraft, used as civilian air charter or wet lease, are operated by AirTanker civilian pilots, but draw cabin crew from the respective civilian airline they operate for.

== Fleet ==
AirTanker Holdings has a 27-year contract to provide 14 aircraft. All airframes are the Airbus A330 MRTT; based upon the A330-243 civilian airliner with a dual-aisle, two-four-two passenger cabin, powered by a pair of Rolls-Royce Trent 772B-60 turbofan jet engines. Each aircraft can carry a total fuel load of 111 tonnes (109 long tons; 122 short tons). The Voyagers are able to dispense 50,000 kilograms (110,231 pounds) of fuel, from its existing wing and fuselage fuel tanks, to receiver aircraft via its hose-and-drogue systems. They have a loiter time of up to four hours, and a range of more than 1,852 kilometres (1,151 miles).

The AirTanker Holdings fleet originally consisted of a 'core' fleet of nine military aircraft; eight with UK military registration marks (starting in series with ZZ330, as a nod to its Airbus A330 type) and one UK civilian registration (G-VYGJ, permanently used for the South Atlantic Air Bridge), along with a 'surge' fleet of five UK civil registered de-modified demilitarised aircraft (similar to A330-243 standard configuration) which it uses for additional revenue. The surge fleet can be recalled for military use at any time as required. This fleet balance was subsequently revised; the military-registered core fleet was increased to ten aircraft, and the civilian-registered surge fleet reducing to four.

=== Versions ===
The AirTanker Holdings owned fleet of fourteen aircraft are known by the following official nomenclature, as defined by their primary operator (identified by its ICAO airline designator code):

==== Royal Air Force (RAF) ====
Primarily operated by RAF military Sponsored Reservist pilots and cabin crew of No. 10 Squadron and No. 101 Squadron, along with No. 1312 Flight of the RAF by AirTanker Services. All aircraft (excluding the gloss-white VIP converted Vespina) are externally painted in a low-visibility matt-grey livery, with RAF insignia and roundels, identified by their British military aircraft registration mark:

- Voyager KC2 – three aircraft with two under-wing outboard Cobham 905E hose and drogue refuelling pods, suitable for supplying fuel to probe-equipped small fast-jet combat aircraft such as the Panavia Tornado, Eurofighter Typhoon, and Lockheed Martin F-35B.
- Voyager KC3 – seven aircraft identical to the KC2, but with an additional centreline Cobham 805E Fuselage Refuelling Unit suitable for supplying fuel in larger volumes at higher delivery rate to probe-equipped larger military transport aircraft and mission-specific military converted civilian airliners, such as the Lockheed Martin C-130J Hercules and Airbus A400M Atlas.

==== AirTanker (TOW) ====
Operated by AirTanker Services civilian pilots and cabin crew. Dependent on primary mission (typically wet lease or damp lease), these are externally painted white with lessor airline logos, or low-visibility matt-grey (identical to the RAF Voyagers) with AirTanker logos for the individual airframe (currently G-VYGJ) permanently tasked for the South Atlantic Air Bridge. All aircraft are identified by their British civilian aircraft registration mark:

- A330-243 — four de-modified and demilitarised aircraft operating purely as a civilian passenger airliner for short-term air charter or longer-term wet or damp lease.

AirTanker Holdings Limited aircraft fleet
Military reg.	Civilian reg.	Type & Ddesig.	Operator	Passenger seating capacity	Home base	Date in service see note 1 below	Year built	Notes / livery / operations
ZZ330	G-VYGA	Voyager KC2	RAF	291	RAF Brize Norton	21 Dec 2011	2009	
ZZ331	G-VYGB	Voyager KC2	RAF	291	RAF Brize Norton	19 Dec 2012	2011	
ZZ332	G-VYGC	Voyager KC3	RAF	291	RAF Brize Norton	26 Apr 2013	2011	
ZZ333	G-VYGD	Voyager KC3	RAF	291	RAF Akrotiri	29 May 2013	2012	
ZZ334	G-VYGE	Voyager KC3	RAF	291	RAF Akrotiri	31 Jul 2014	2009	
ZZ335	G-VYGF	Voyager KC3	RAF	291	RAF Brize Norton	29 Jun 2013	2012	
ZZ336	G-VYGG	Voyager KC3	RAF	58 VIP/business class, 100 economy	RAF Brize Norton	30 Nov 2012	2012	Converted to VIP specification in 2016, known as Vespina since 'Global Britain' livery applied in June 2020
ZZ337	G-VYGH	Voyager KC3	RAF	291	RAF Mount Pleasant	29 Jan 2014	2009	
ZZ338	G-VYGI	Voyager KC3	RAF	291	RAF Brize Norton	29 May 2014	2013	
ZZ339	G-VYGJ	A330-243	AirTanker for RAF	291	RAF Brize Norton	14 Aug 2014	2013	Low-visibility matt-grey livery with AirTanker logos, primarily tasked for the South Atlantic Air Bridge
ZZ340	G-VYGK	A330-243	AirTanker for RAF	320 when leased	RAF Brize Norton	5 Feb 2015	2013	Low-visibility white livery
ZZ341	G-VYGL	A330-243	AirTanker for Jet2.com	327	Manchester	22 Jun 2015	2013	White Jet2.com livery
ZZ342	G-VYGM	A330-243	AirTanker for Jet2.com	327	Manchester	24 Feb 2016	2014	White Jet2.com livery
ZZ343	G-VYGN	Voyager KC2	RAF	291	RAF Brize Norton	13 Jul 2016	2014	

Notes:

1. The dates in service indicate the point in time when each aircraft was delivered to its operator at RAF Brize Norton, specifically as a Voyager following conversion of an existing civilian airliner by Airbus Military into its full MRTT specification; these airframes were individually manufactured some years earlier, the oldest airframe taking its first flight (as a civilian airliner prior to MRTT conversion) on 4 June 2009.
2. One RAF Voyager KC3 (currently ZZ337) is permanently based at RAF Mount Pleasant in the Falkland Islands as part of No. 1312 Flight RAF, to provide aerial refuelling for the Flight's A400M Atlas C1 transport aircraft, along with the four quick reaction alert (QRA) Typhoon FGR4 fighter jets of No. 1435 Flight RAF. An additional demilitarised A330-243 operated by AirTanker is used twice weekly to provide the air bridge between RAF Brize Norton in the UK and RAF Mount Pleasant in the South Atlantic.

== Accidents and incidents ==
On Sunday 9 February 2014, an RAF Voyager KC3, registration ZZ333, carrying 189 passengers from RAF Brize Norton to Camp Bastion in Afghanistan when it rapidly lost 4,440 feet (1,350 metres) of altitude in 27 seconds while cruising over Turkey at 33,000 feet (10,000 metres). It reached a maximum descent rate of 15,800 feet per minute (4,800 metres per minute). The sudden descent caused several injuries to twenty-five passengers and seven crew members. The aircraft diverted to Incirlik Air Base in Turkey and landed without further incident, but the RAF Voyager fleet was grounded for twelve days. Investigators determined that the captain's improperly stowed DSLR camera had become jammed between their armrest and the side-stick controller, forcing the controls forward when the captain adjusted his seat.

== Gallery ==
AirTanker Holdings Limited gallery of aircraft
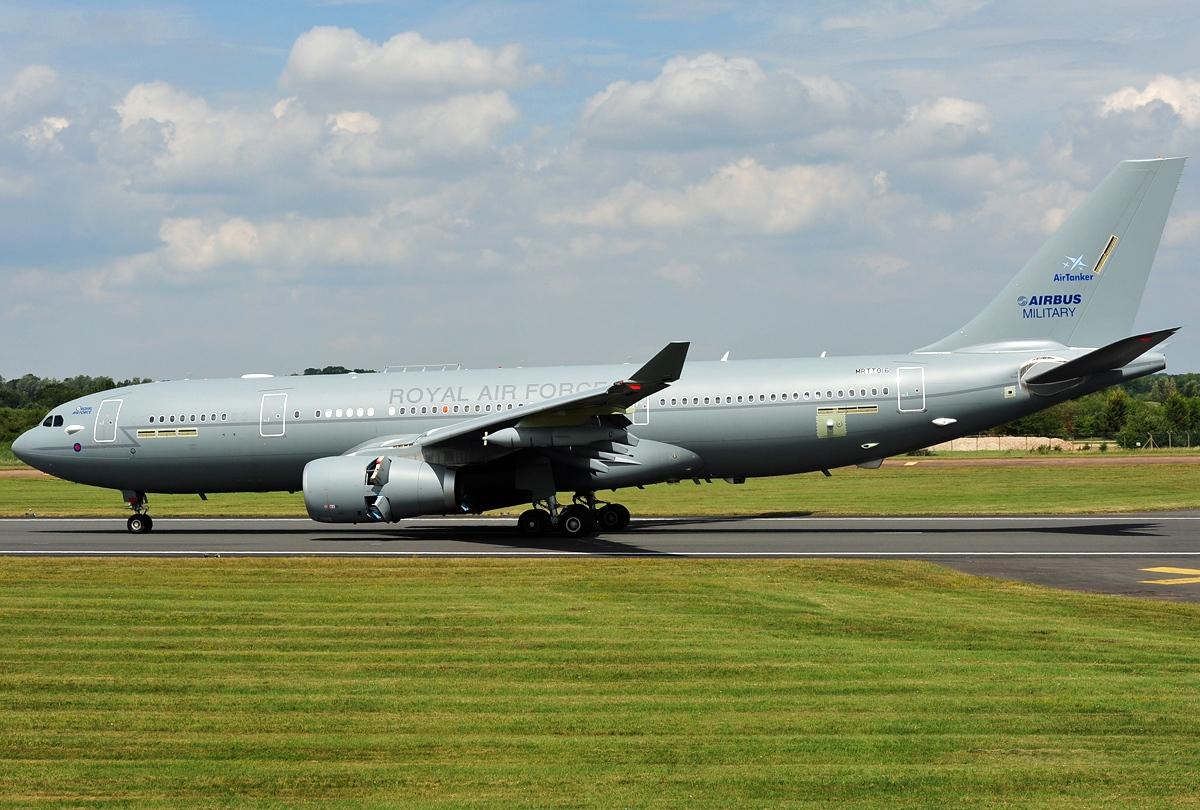
Early AirTanker Royal Air Force Voyager landing at RAF Fairford in 2011, still displaying its Airbus Military registration MRTT016. Subsequently registered G-VYGE, currently registered ZZ334.

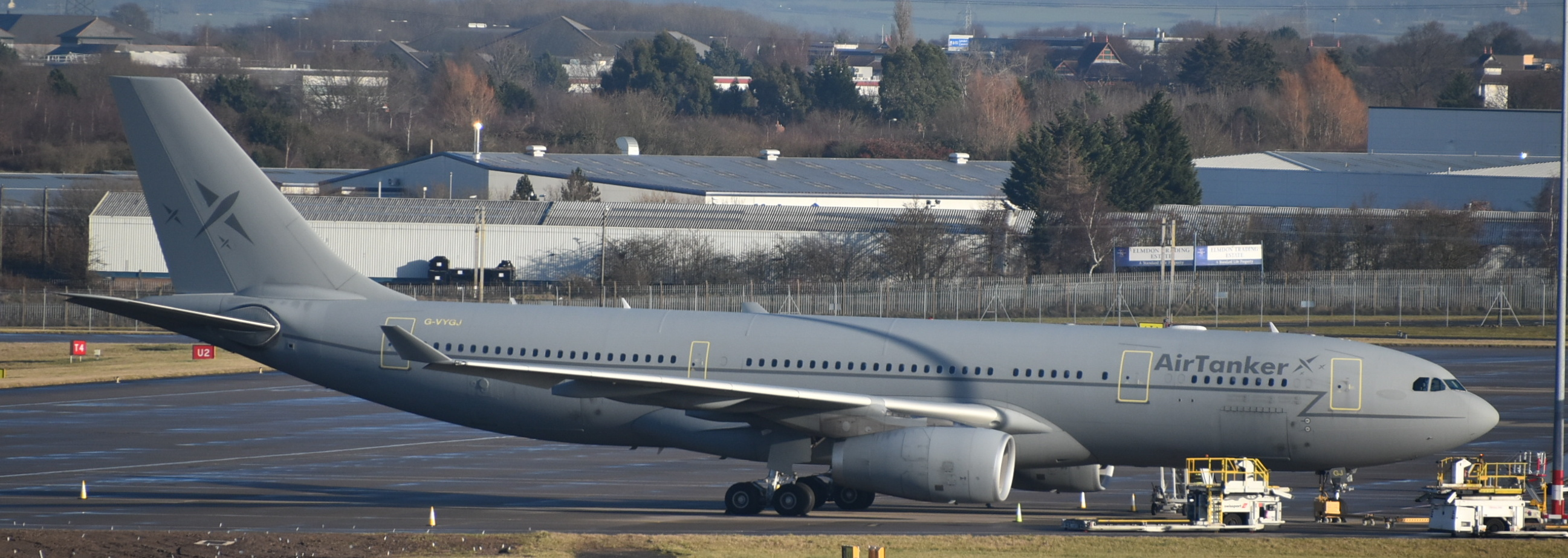
AirTanker Services liveried A330-243, G-VYGJ (MSN: 1439), the airframe used for the South Atlantic Air Bridge, 2016.

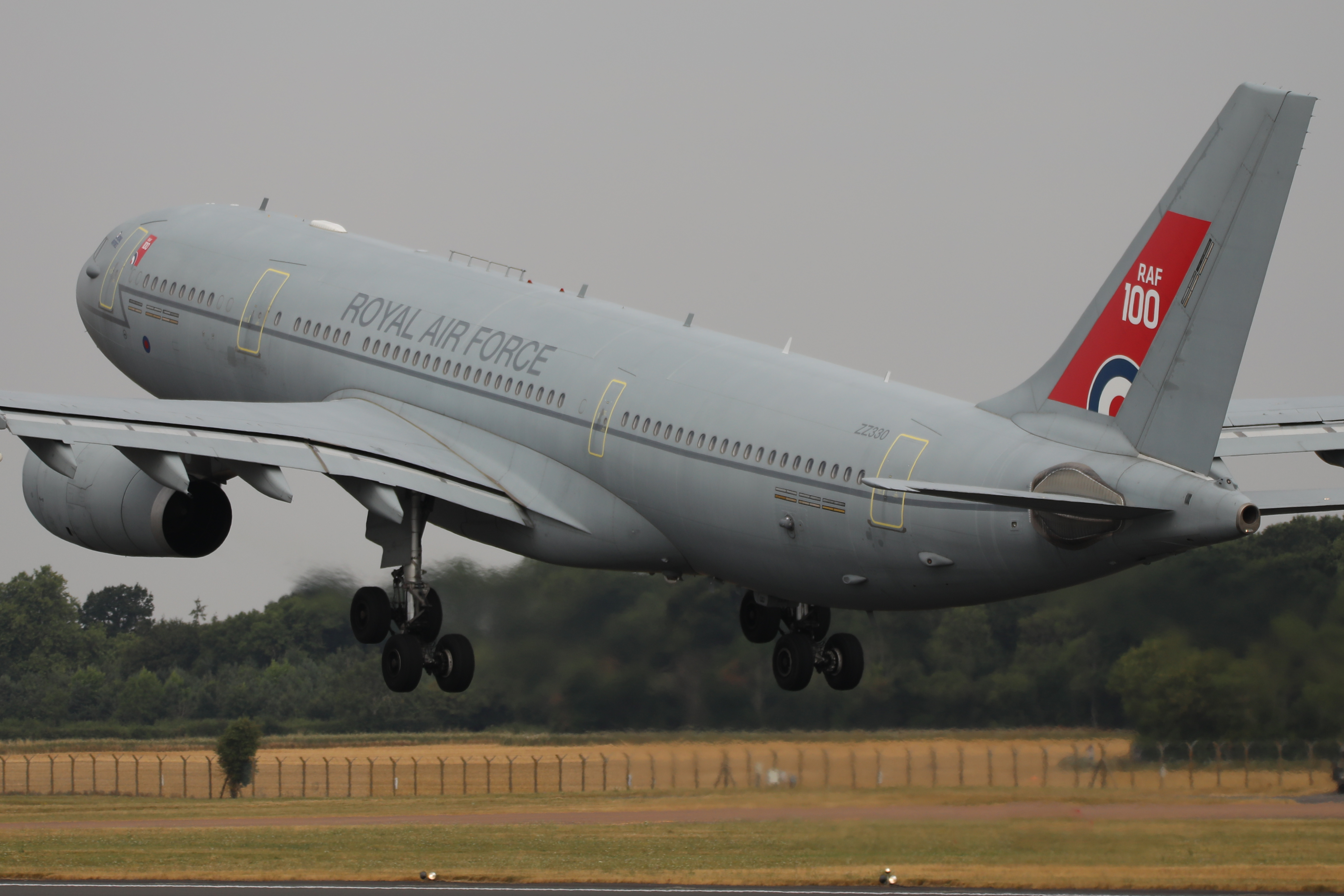
Royal Air Force Voyager KC2 ZZ330 (MSN: 1046) displaying the RAF 100 centenary anniversary markings at the Royal International Air Tattoo, 2018.

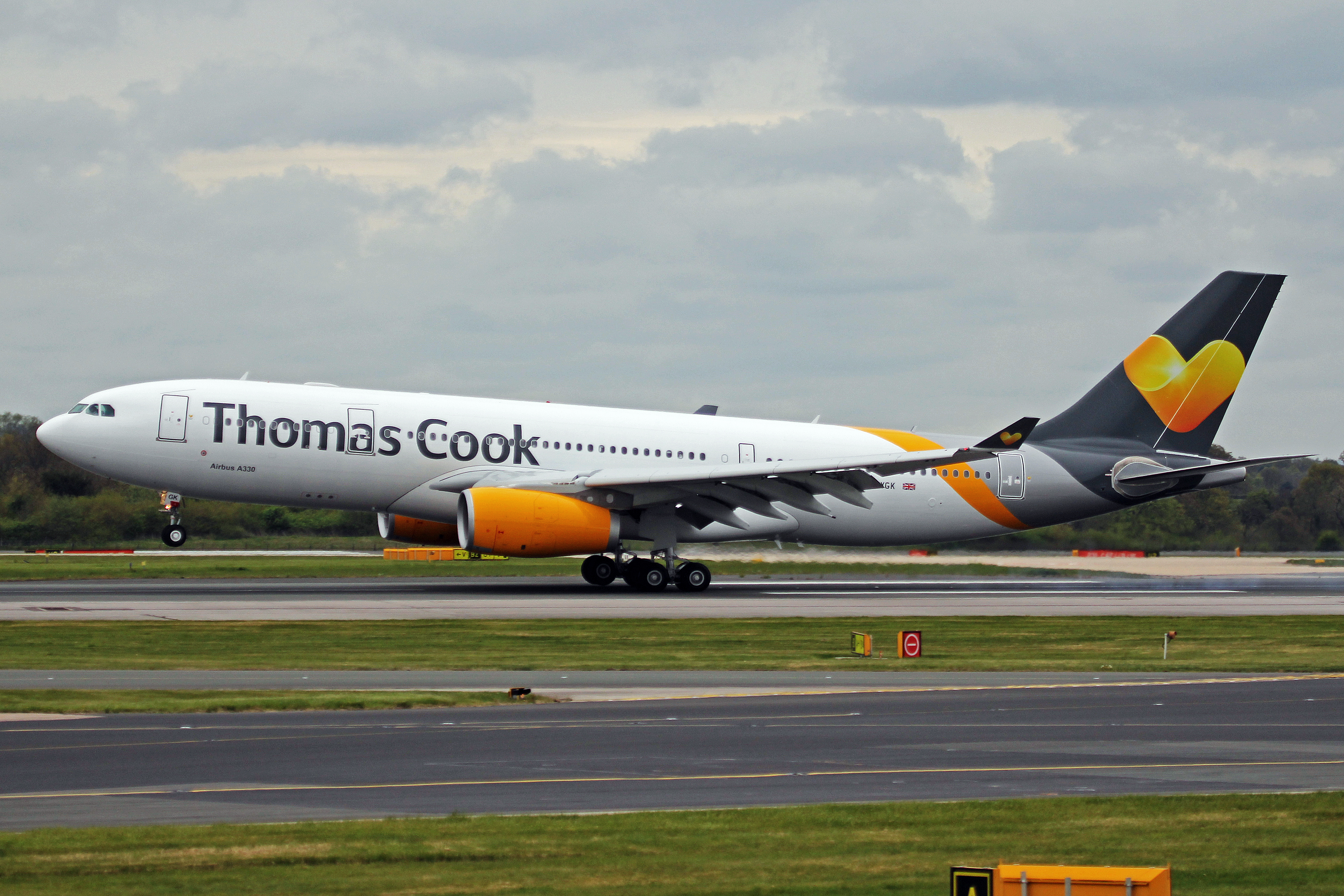
An AirTanker demilitarised Airbus A330-243 G-VYGK (MSN: 1498) wet-leased to Thomas Cook Airlines at Manchester Airport, 2015.

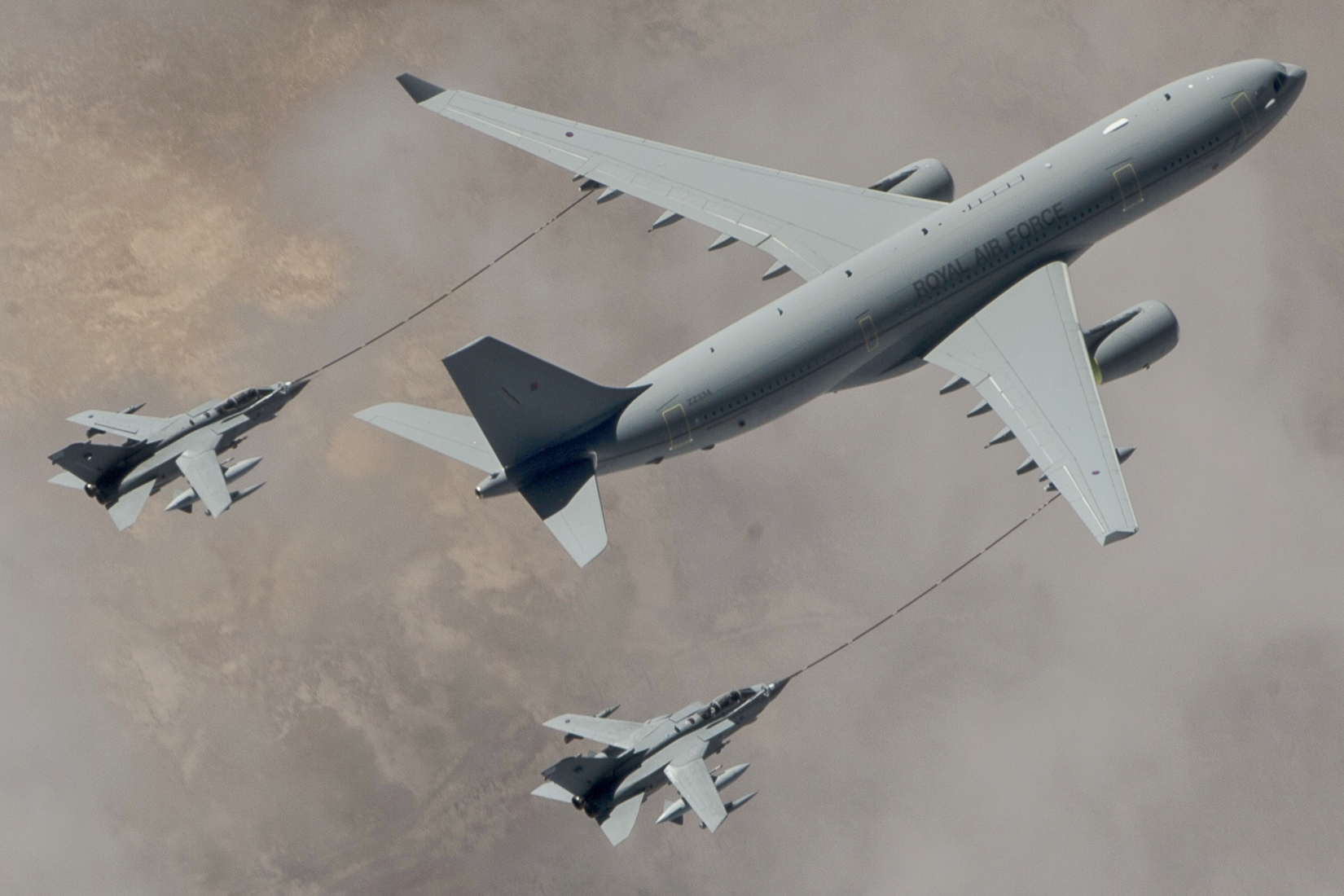
ZZ334 (MSN: 1033) with its two under-wing refuelling hoses extended refuels two RAF Tornado GR4 during Operation Shader, 4 March 2015, over Iraq.

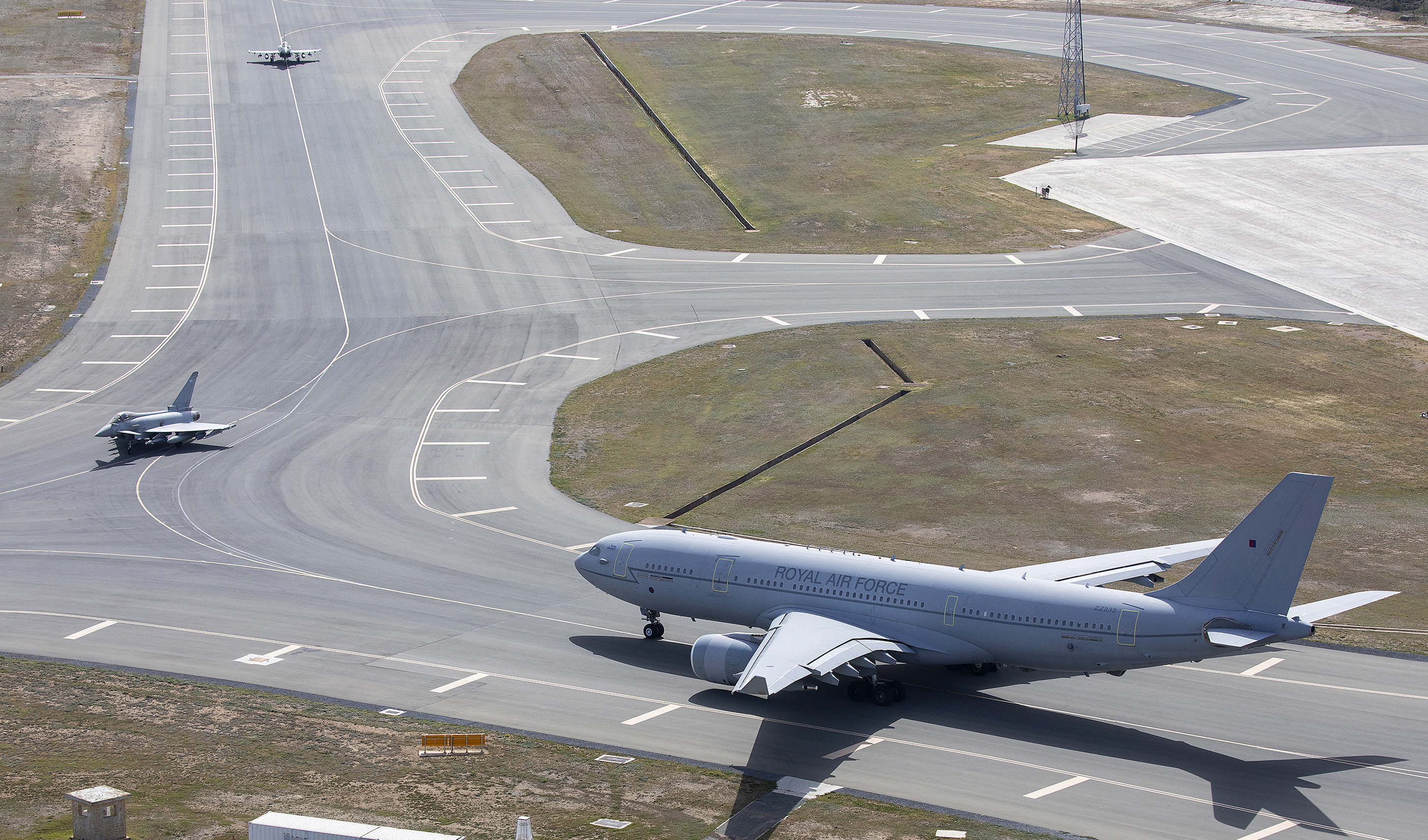
ZZ333 (MSN: 1312), one of the two Voyager KC3 aircraft involved in Operation Shader at RAF Akrotiri in Cyprus, 2021.

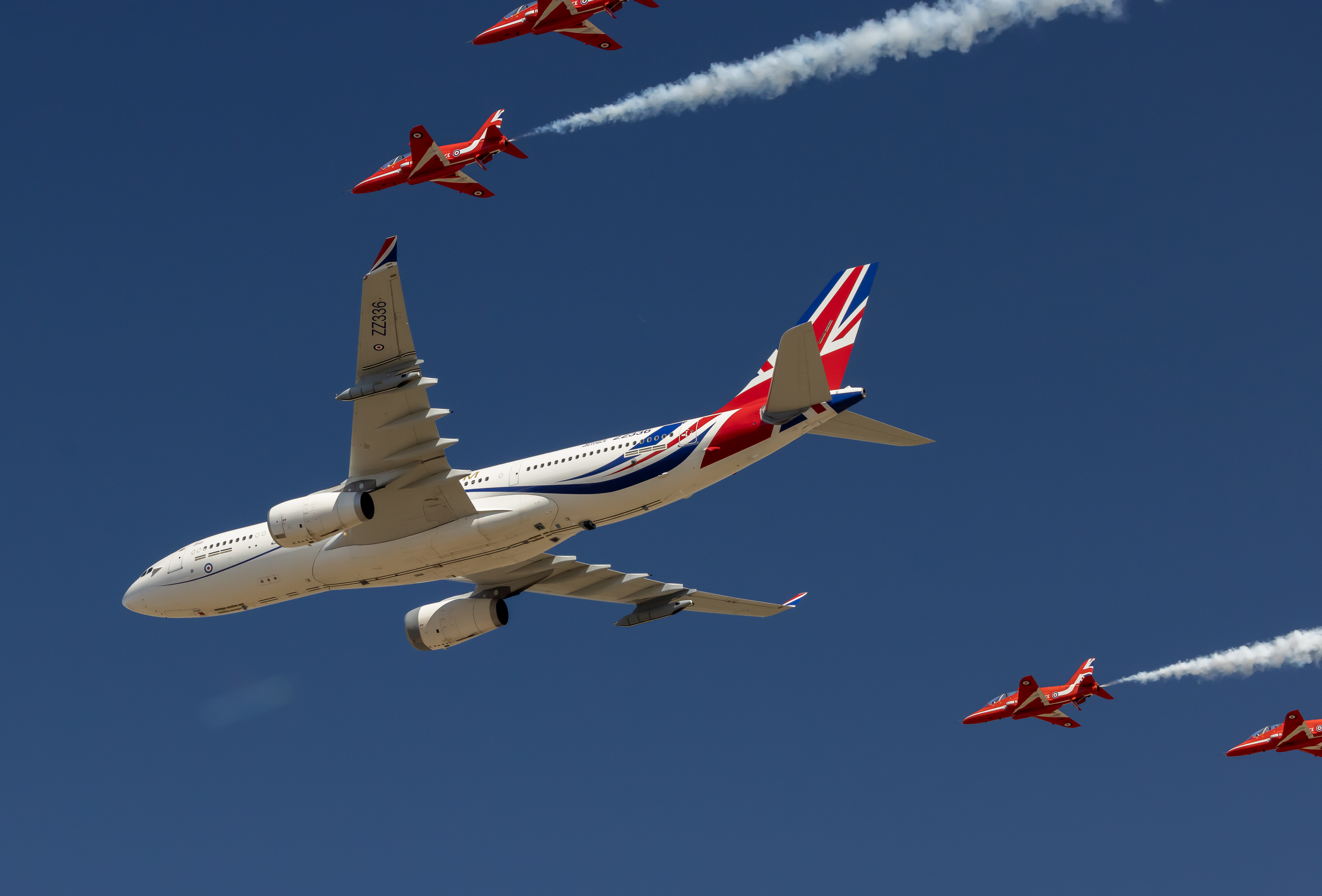
ZZ336 Vespina, the AirTanker RAF Voyager KC3 (MSN: 1363) converted for VIP use, operated by 10 Squadron of the Royal Air Force, whilst still retaining its core military capability of aerial tanker, 2022.

Video from the MOD of unidentified RAF Voyager in-flight refuelling RAF Tornado GR4s during Operation Shader, 2014.

== See also ==
- Titan Airways — private charter company who operate a 'Global Britain' liveried Airbus A321-253NX NEO for VIP duties
