= United Kingdom military aircraft registration mark =

Visual identification system for United Kingdom military aircraft

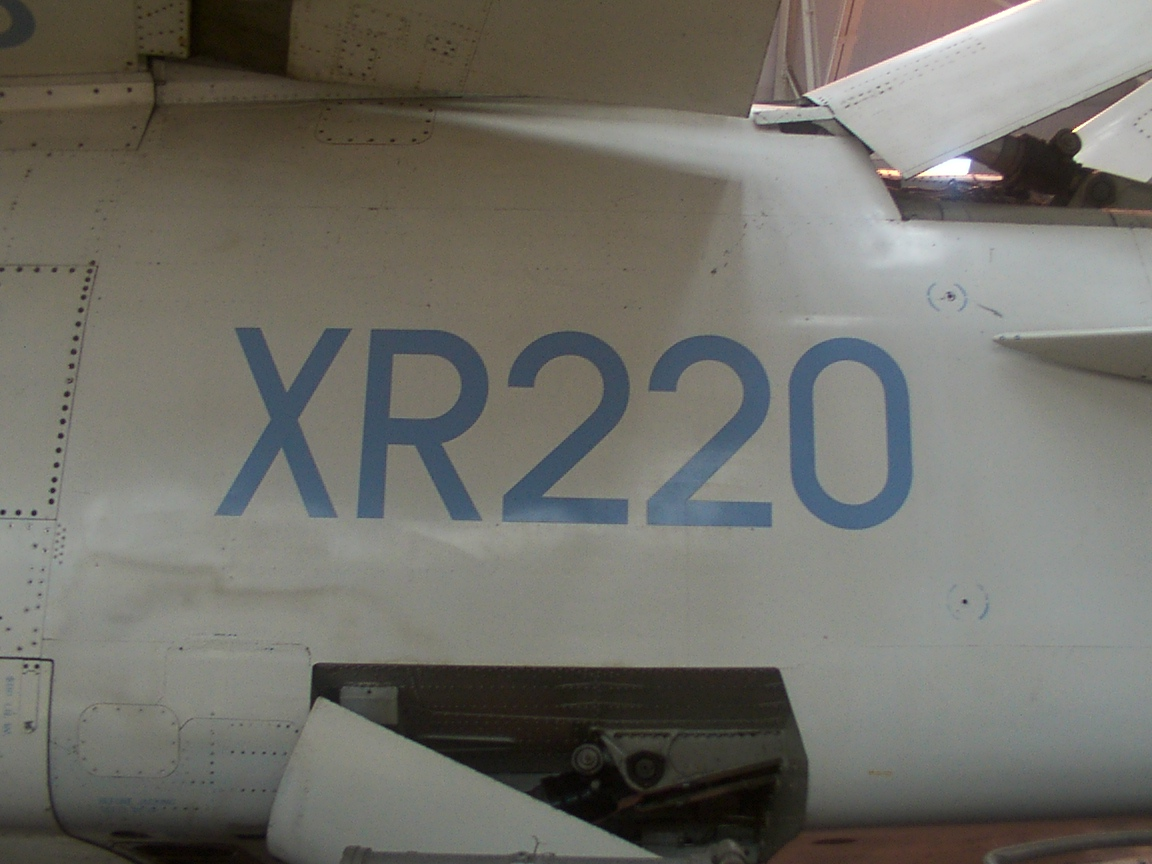
Close-up of registration mark XR220 on BAC TSR-2.

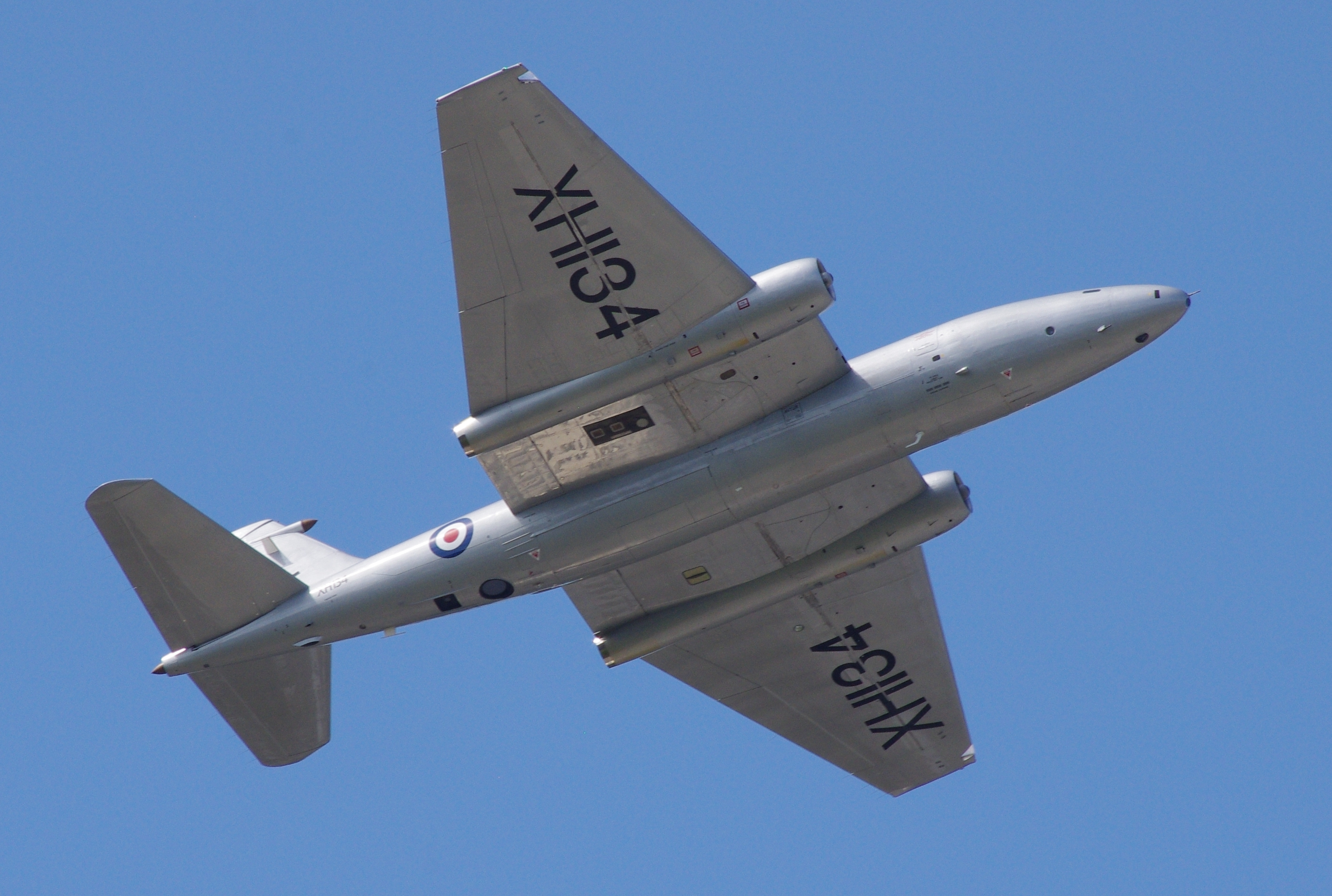
English Electric Canberra PR.9 showing large underwing registration marks (XH134).

A United Kingdom military aircraft registration mark, informally and unofficially known as its 'serial number', is a specific aircraft registration scheme used to identify individual military aircraft belonging to the United Kingdom (UK). Originally issued by individual service branches (Royal Navy and British Army), upon creation of the Royal Air Force (RAF) on 1 April 1918, the Air Ministry (1918 to 1964) became the issuing authority. When the Ministry of Defence (MoD) was created in 1 April 1964 (combining the three separate service ministries), registration marks were subsequently issued and maintained by the Air Section of the MoD (MoD Air). From 2020, UK military aircraft registration is now issued and controlled by the Military Aviation Authority (MAA), with all aircraft being registered on the UK Military Aircraft Register (MAR).

All current United Kingdom military aircraft display a unique registration mark, allocated from a unified registration alpha-numeric system. The same unified registration system is used for aircraft operated by the Royal Air Force (RAF), the Fleet Air Arm (FAA) of the Royal Navy, and the Army Air Corps (AAC) of the British Army. Military aircraft operated by government agencies and civilian contractors; for example Empire Test Pilots' School, (now part of QinetiQ), AirTanker Services (RAF Voyager KC2 and KC3), BAE Systems (Hawk and Typhoon), Babcock International (Grob Prefect T1, (the RAF Grob Tutor T1 were civilian registered)) are sometimes also assigned registration numbers from this system.

Once a UK military aircraft registration mark is issued to an individual aircraft airframe, that can not be re-assigned to another airframe; however, existing airframes can be registered with a new registration mark.

== History ==
When the Royal Flying Corps (RFC) was formed in 1912, its aircraft were identified originally by a number, subsequently by a letter/number system related to the manufacturer. The prefix 'A' was allocated to balloons of No. 1 Company, Air Battalion, Royal Engineers, the prefix 'B' to fixed-wing aeroplanes of No. 2 Company, and the prefix 'F' to aeroplanes of the Central Flying School (CFS). The Naval Wing used the prefix 'H' for seaplanes ('Hydroaeroplanes' as they were then known), 'M' for monoplanes, and 'T' for aeroplanes with engines mounted in tractor configuration. Before the end of the first year, a unified aircraft registration number system was introduced for both Army and Naval (Royal Naval Air Service) aircraft.

The registration marks are allocated by the British government authorities at the time the contract for supply is placed with the aircraft manufacturer or supplier.

In an RAF or FAA pilot's personal service log book, the registration mark of any aircraft flown, along with any other particulars, such as aircraft type, flight duration, purpose of flight, 'kills' (for combat aircraft), etc., is entered by the pilot after every flight, thus giving a complete record of the pilot's flying activities and which individual aircraft have been flown.

== 1 to 10000 ==
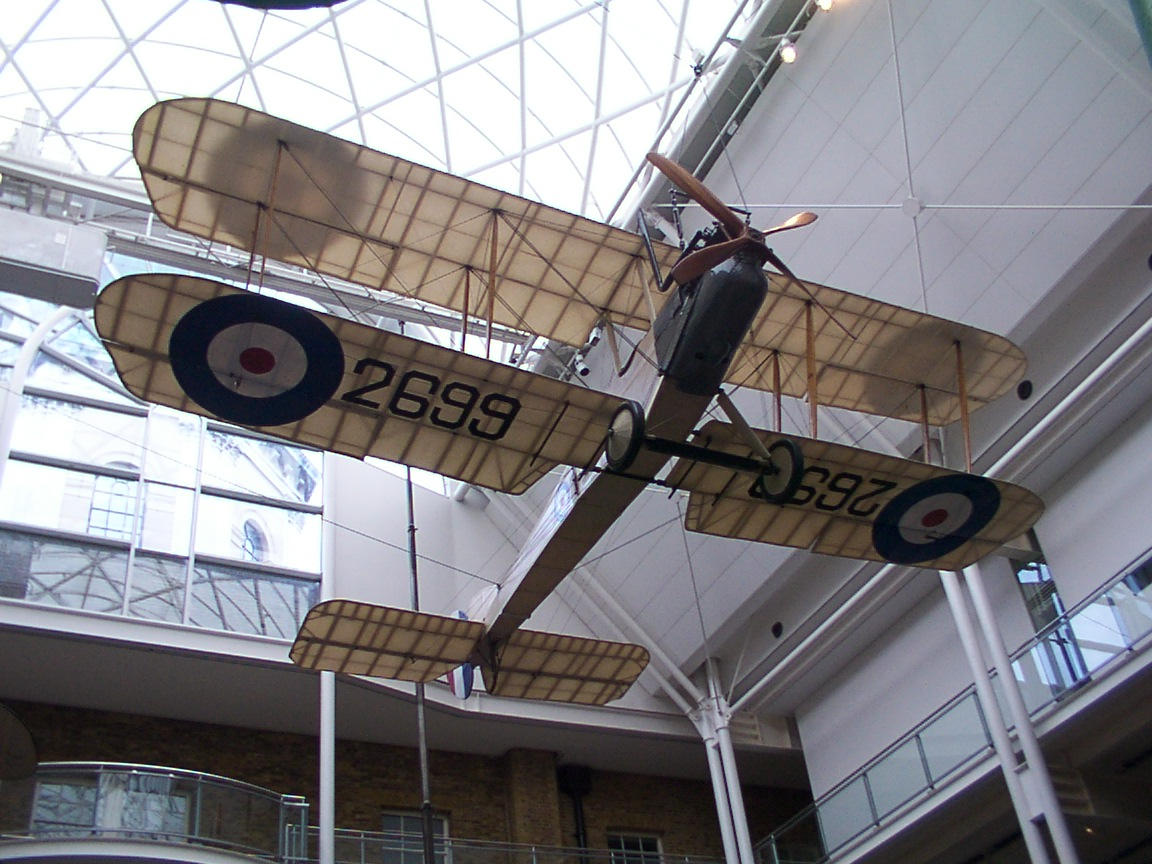
2699, a Royal Aircraft Factory B.E.2 from the 1910s.

The first military aircraft registration marks were sequentially issued from 1 to 10000, with blocks allocated to each service branch. The first actual registration number was allocated to a Short S.34 for the Royal Naval Air Service (RNAS), with the number 10000 going to a Blackburn-built Royal Aircraft Factory B.E.2c aircraft in 1916.

== A1 to Z9999 ==
By 1916, the first sequence had reached 10000, and it was decided to start an alpha-numeric system for military aircraft registration; from A1 (allocated to a Royal Aircraft Factory BE.2d) to A9999, then starting again at B1. The letters A, B, C, D, E, F, H, and J were allocated to the Royal Flying Corps (RFC), and N1 to N9999 and S1 to S9999 to the Royal Naval Air Service (RNAS). When the sequence reached the prefix K, it was decided to start at K1000 for all subsequent letters instead of K1.

Although the N and S sequences had earlier been used by RNAS aircraft, the sequence N1000 to N9999 was again used by the Air Ministry for both RAF and RN aircraft. The 'Naval' S sequence had reached only S1865, a Fairey IIIF, but when R9999 was reached in 1939, the next registration mark allocations did not run on from that point, but instead commenced at T1000.

From 1937, not all aircraft registration marks were allocated, in order to hide the true number of aircraft in production and service. Gaps in the sequential number sequence were sometimes referred to as 'blackout blocks'. The first example of this practice was an early 1937 order for two-hundred Avro Manchester bombers; which were allotted the registration marks L7276–L7325, L7373–L7402, L7415–L7434, L7453–L7497, L7515–L7549, and L7565–L7584, covering a range of 309 possible sequential registration marks, and thus making it difficult for an enemy to estimate true British military aircraft strength.

== AA100 to ZZ999 ==
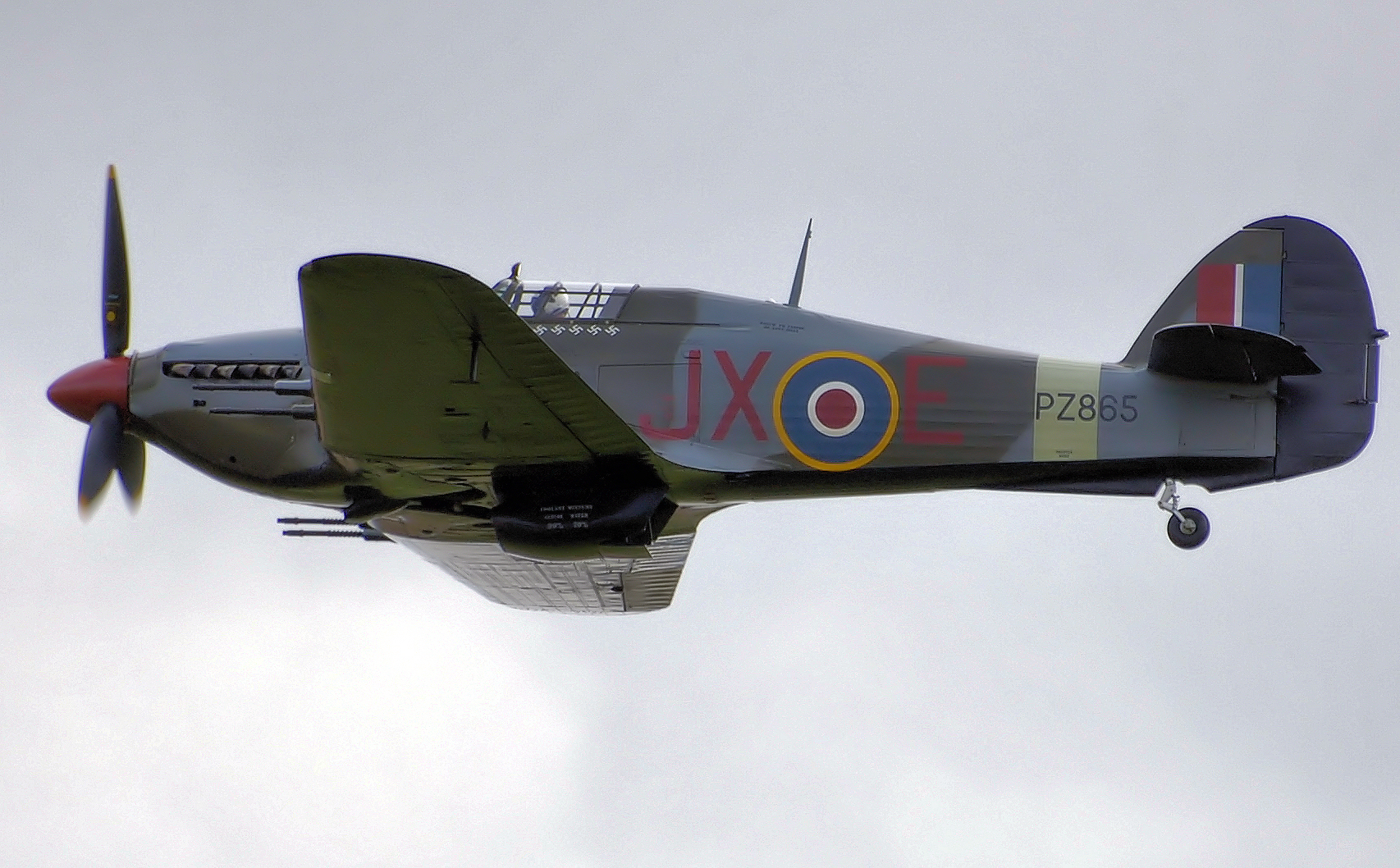
PZ865, a Hawker Hurricane from the 1940s.

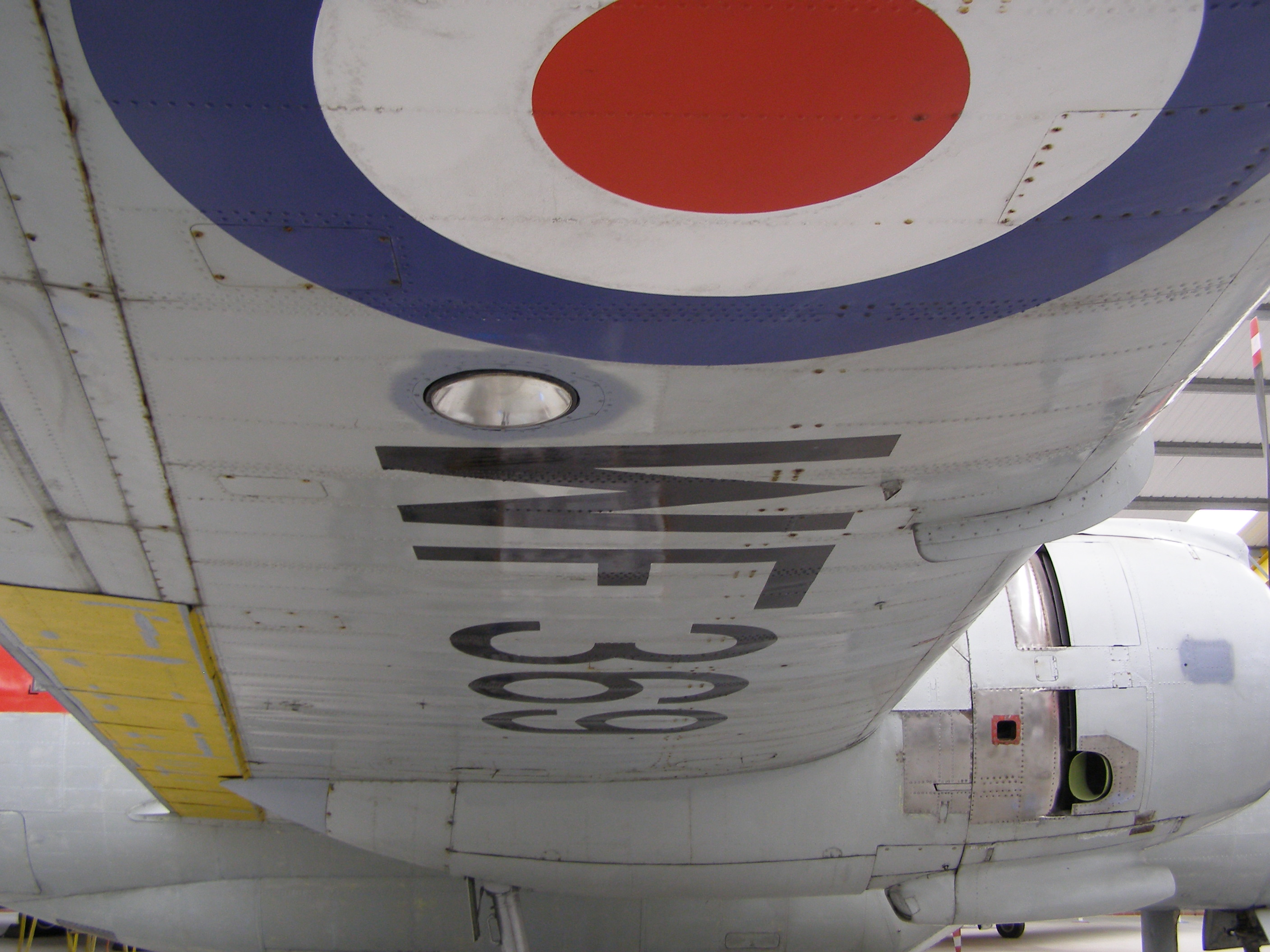
WF369 under-wing registration mark on a Vickers Varsity from the 1950s.

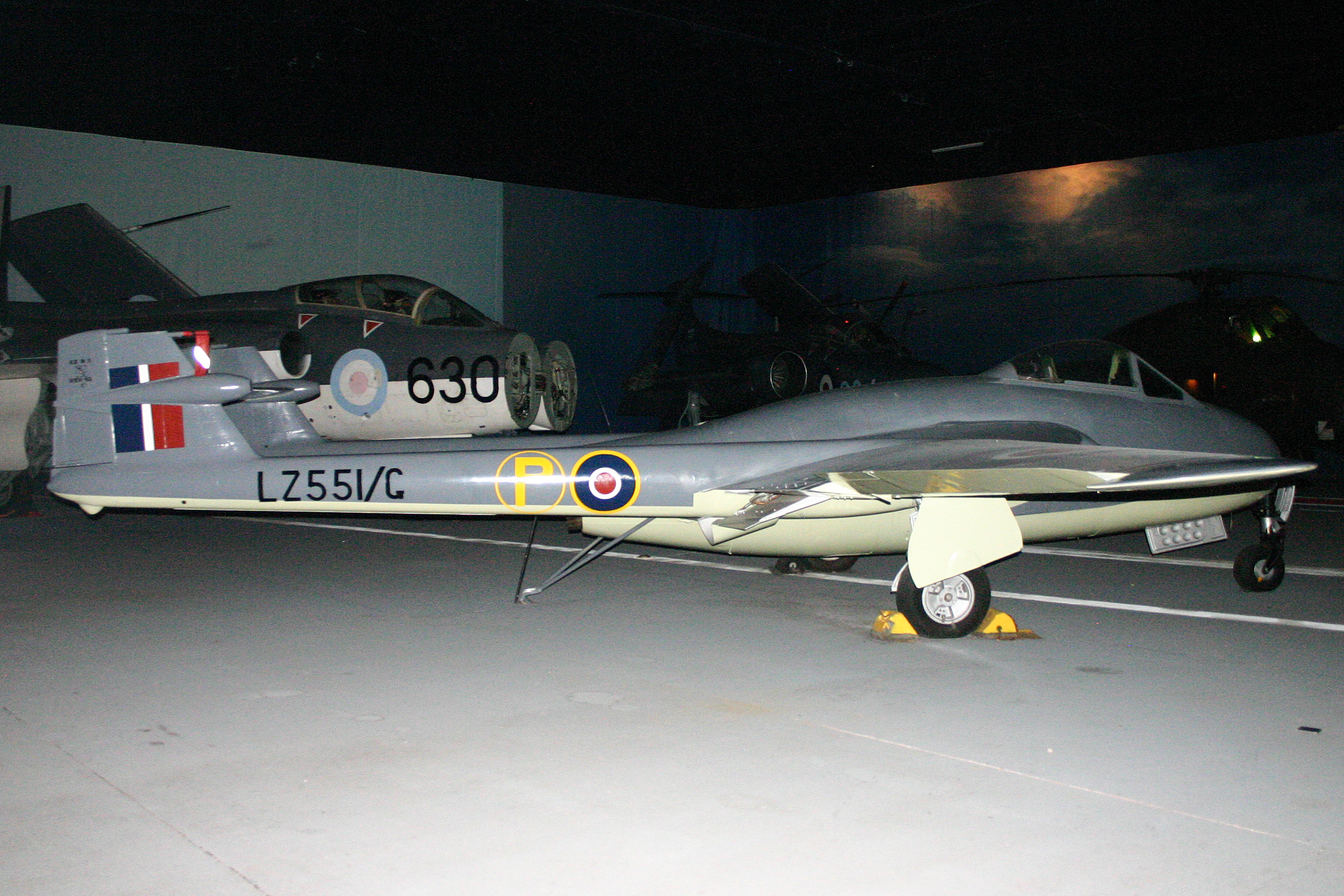
LZ551/G, a DH.100 Sea Vampire with yellow P for prototype. This aircraft is the one used by Eric 'Winkle' Brown in deck-landing trials aboard the carrier HMS Ocean (R68) in the 1950s.

By 1940, the registration mark Z9978 had been allocated to a Bristol Blenheim, and it was decided to restart the sequence with a two-letter prefix, starting at AA100. This sequence is still in use today. Until the 1990s, this two-letter–three-numeral registration mark sequence, had numbers in the range 100 to 999. An exception to this rule was a Douglas Skyraider AEW1 which received the UK registration mark WT097, which incorporated the last three digits of its United States Navy (USN) Bureau Number 124097. Recently, past unassigned registration mark numbers, including those having numerals 001–099, have been assigned.

Some letters have not been used to avoid confusion: C could be confused with G, I confused with 1, O and Q confused with 0, U confused with V, and Y confused with X. (Note: Two exceptions, both operated by QinetiQ, are registration marks QQ101 and QQ102, used on two different variants of the BAe 146 in 2017.)

During the Second World War, RAF aircraft carrying secret equipment, or that were in themselves secret, such as certain military prototypes, had a '/G' suffix added to the end of the registration mark, the 'G' signifying 'guard', denoting that the aircraft was to have an armed guard of the Royal Air Force Police (RAFP) at all times while on the ground; examples include: W4041/G, the prototype Gloster E.28/39 jet, powered by the Whittle jet engine; LZ548/G, the prototype de Havilland Vampire jet fighter; or ML926/G, a de Havilland Mosquito XVI experimentally fitted with H2S radar.

As of 2009, registration mark allocations have reached the ZKnnn range. However since about the year 2000, registration numbers have increasingly been allocated out-of-sequence. For example, the first Royal Air Force Boeing C-17 Globemaster III was given the registration number ZZ171 in 2001 (the leading '17n' being homage to its C-17 military designation), and a batch of Britten-Norman Defenders for the Army Air Corps (AAC) were given registration marks in the ZGnnn range in 2003 (the last ZG registration being allocated more than 14 years previously). Also, some recent registration number allocations have had a numeric part in the previously-unused 001 to 099 range. Some aircraft are given registrations as an acknowledgement to their civilian or military types; specifically, the first Airbus Voyager multi-role tanker transport is registered ZZ330 as a nod to the Airbus A330 from which it is derived (with the remainder of the Voyager fleet sequentially to ZZ343), the Airbus A400M registrations start from ZM400, whilst the first Boeing E-7A Wedgetail aircraft is registered WT001.

== 'Maintenance' registration numbers ==
Distinct registration mark systems are used to identify non-flying airframes, typically used for ground instructional and training (for trainee military aircraft engineering mechanics, technicians, and professional engineers; along with by-type training for existing flight line mechanics and naval flight deck crews). The RAF have used a numeric sequence with an 'M' suffix, sometimes referred to as the 'Maintenance' series. Known allocations, made between 1921 and 2000, ranged from 540M to 9344M, when this sequence was terminated. The main series of single letter registration numbers did not use 'M' to avoid confusion with the suffix 'M'. The Fleet Air Arm use an 'A'-prefixed sequence (e.g. A2606), and the Army Air Corps issue 'TAD' numbers to their instructional airframes (e.g. TAD015).

== Display ==
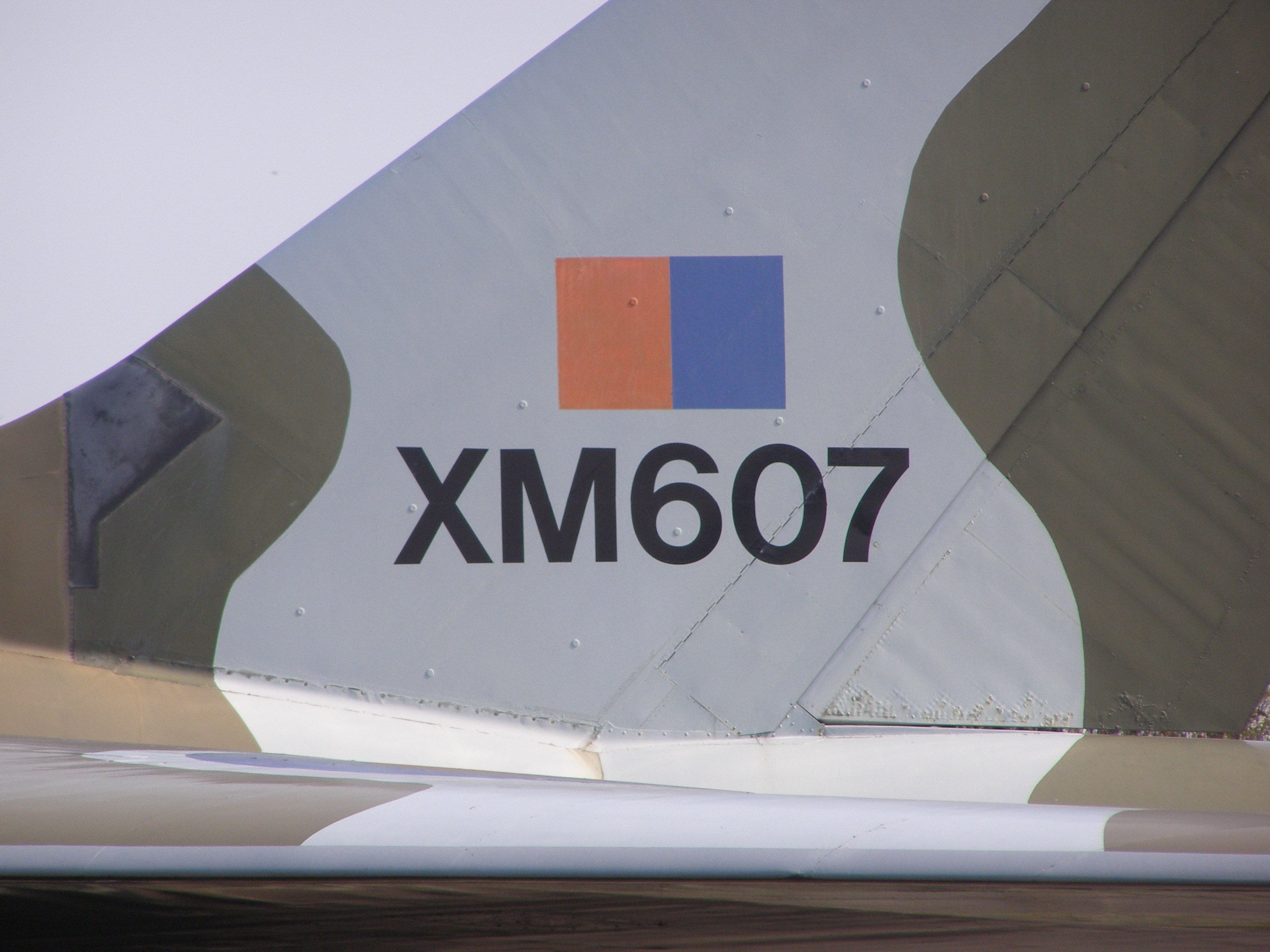
Avro Vulcan XM607 was issued its registration mark in the 1960s; due to the huge delta wing obscuring its rear fuselage, the registration mark was placed on each side of its fun (vertical stabiliser).

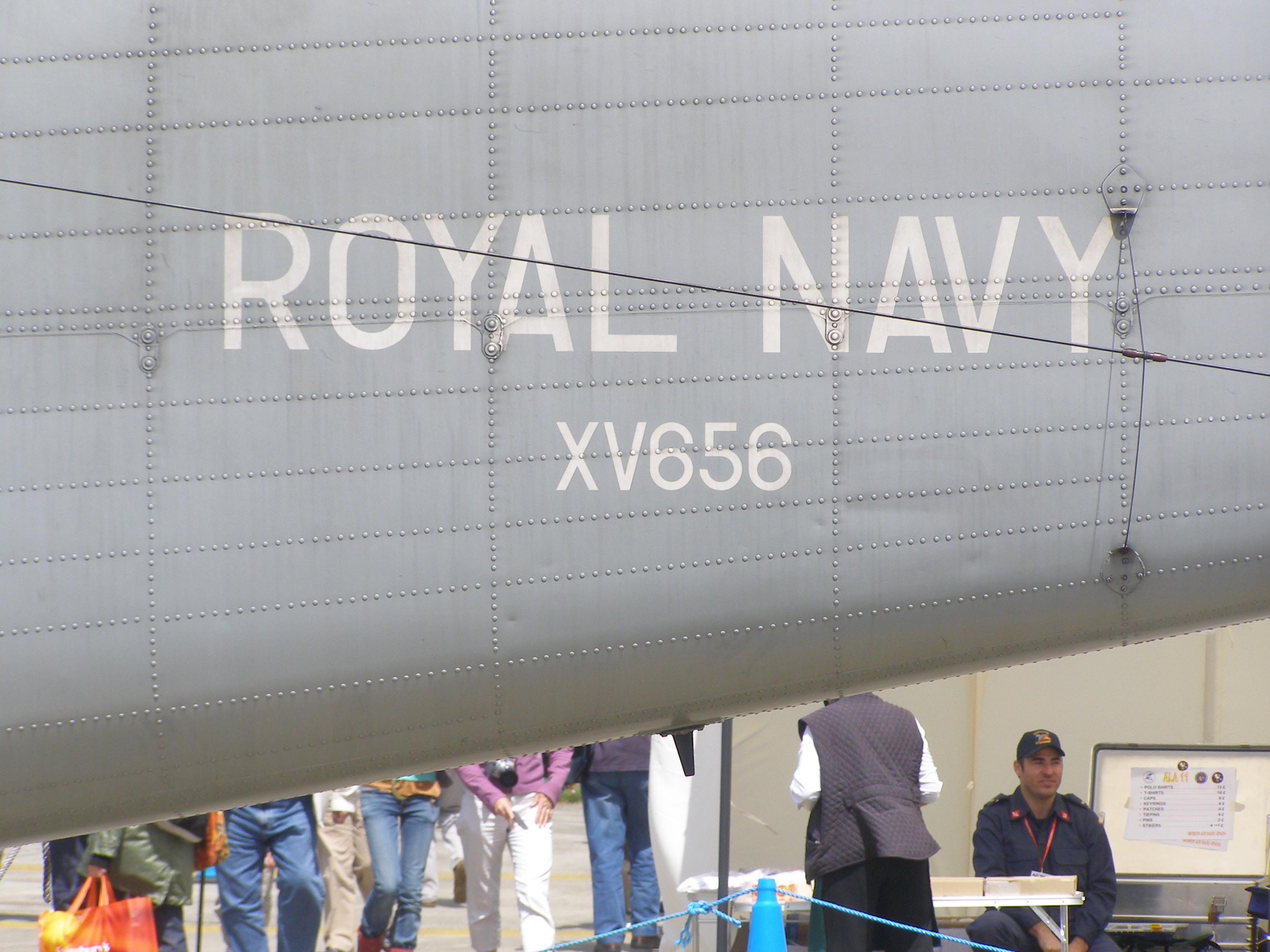
XV656, a Royal Navy Westland Sea King from the 1980s, displayed on each side of its rear fuselage.

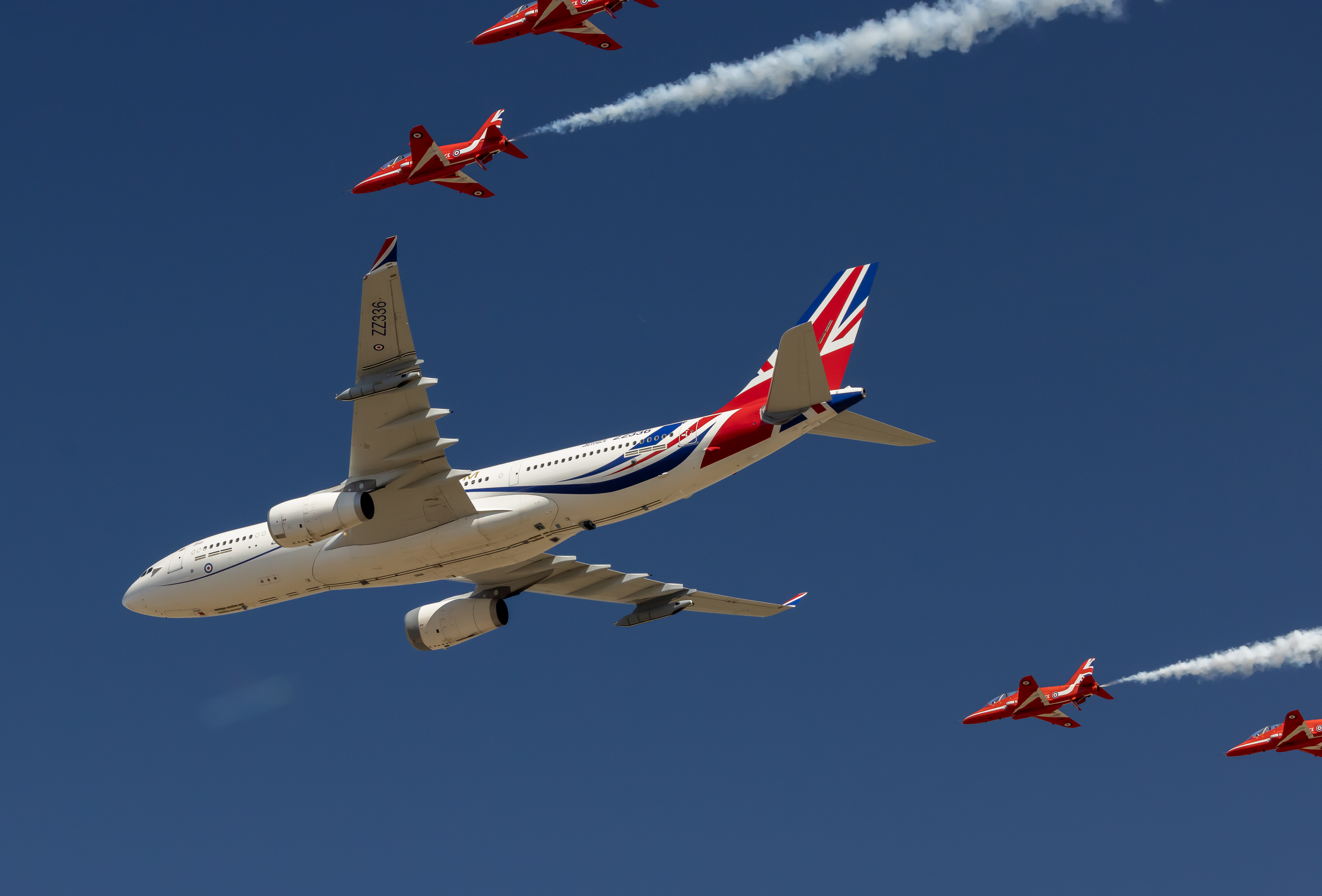
Vespina, the Royal Air Force VIP Voyager displaying her ZZ336 registration mark on her under-side port wing in the 2020s.

The registration marks are normally carried in up to four places on each aircraft; on either side of the aircraft (typically its fuselage) on a vertical surface, and on the underside of each wing. The under-wing registration numbers, originally specified so that in case of unauthorised low flying, affected personnel could report the offending aircraft to the local police force, have not been displayed since the 1960s, as by then, jet aircraft speeds at low level had made the likelihood of a person on the ground being able to read, and thus report them, increasingly remote. The registration mark on each side is usually on the rear fuselage, but this can vary depending on the aircraft type, for instance the delta-winged Gloster Javelin had the registration mark on the forward engine nacelle, and the Avro Vulcan had the registration mark on its tail fin (vertical stabiliser). Helicopters have only carried registration marks on each side, either on the tail-boom or rear fuselage.

The current requirements from the Military Aviation Authority states: "When operating on the UK MAR, registration markings should be appropriately displayed for the size and type of the Aircraft."

== See also ==
- United Kingdom aircraft registration
- United Kingdom aircraft test serials
- British military aircraft designation systems
- Royal Air Force roundels
- List of RAF Squadron Codes
- United States military aircraft serials
