= United Kingdom aircraft registration =

Vehicle register

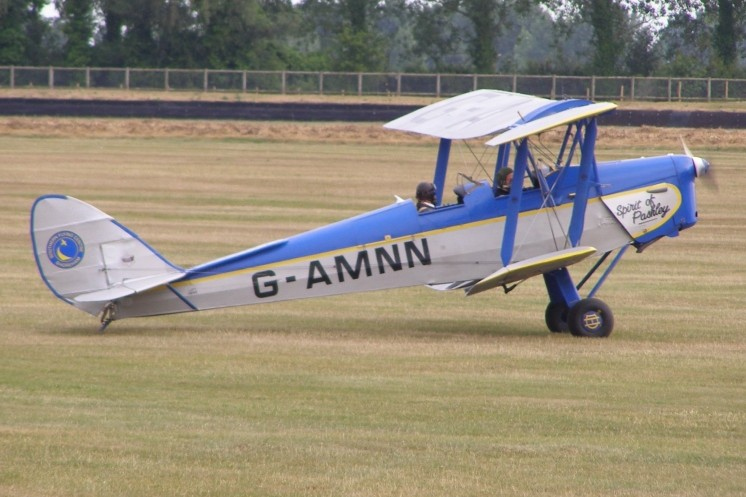

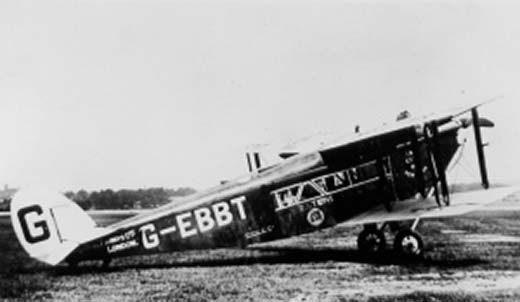
G-EBBT, a de Havilland DH.34 registered in 1922

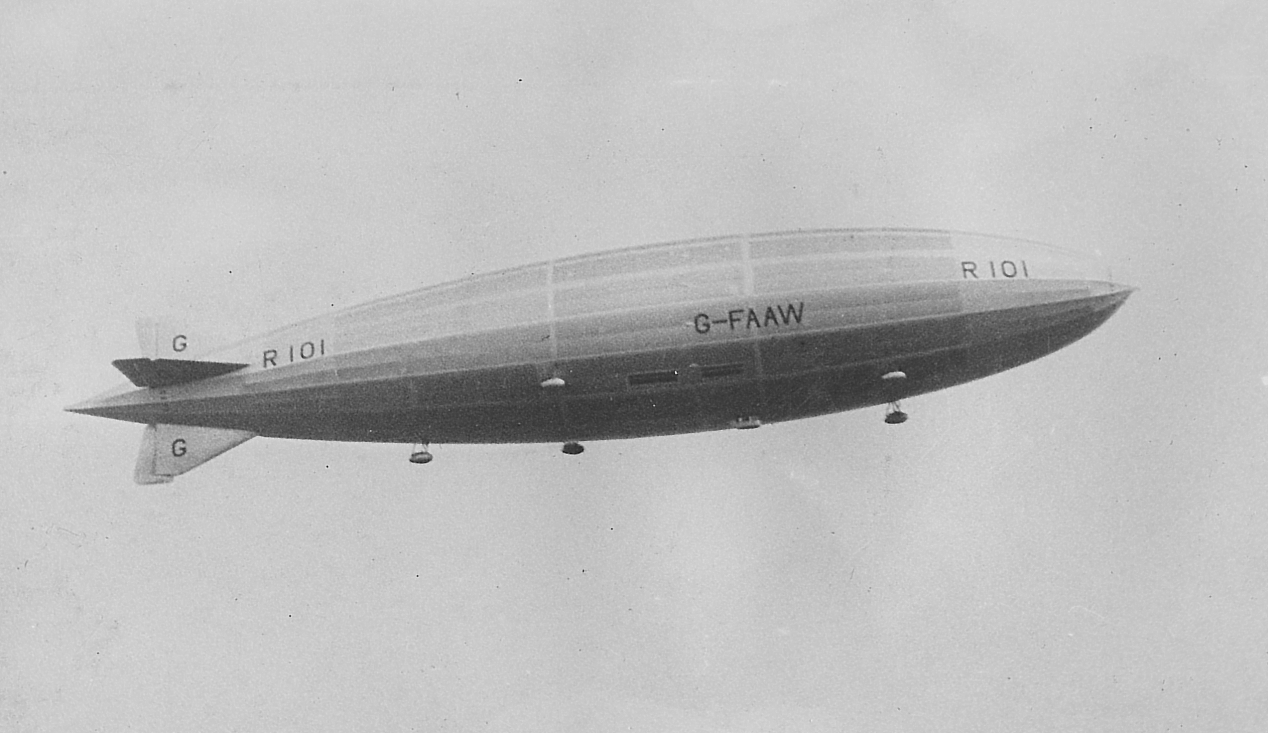
The Royal Airship Works airship R101 was registered G-FAAW

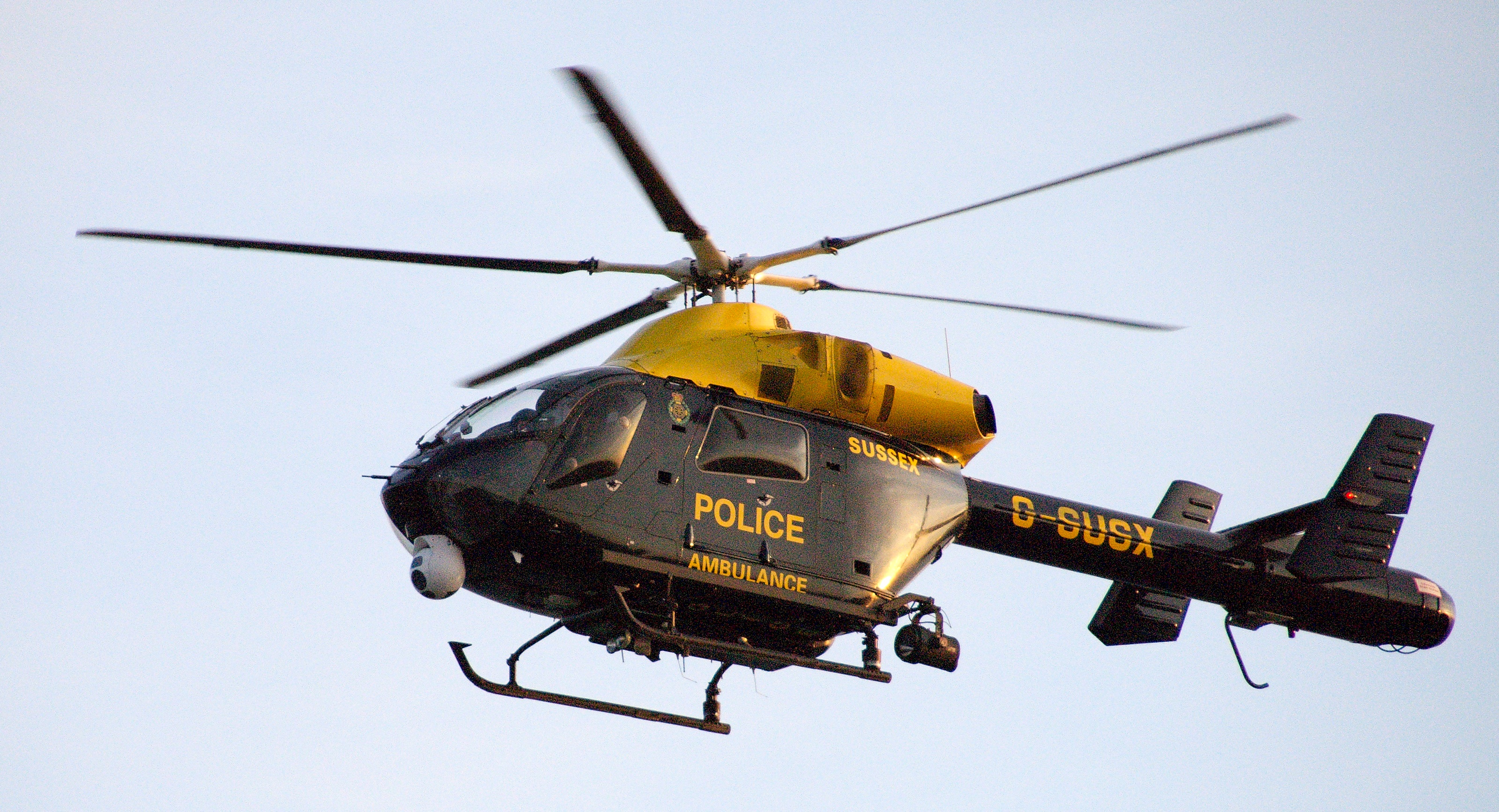
G-SUSX, an out-of-sequence registration for Sussex Police prior to the creation of NPAS

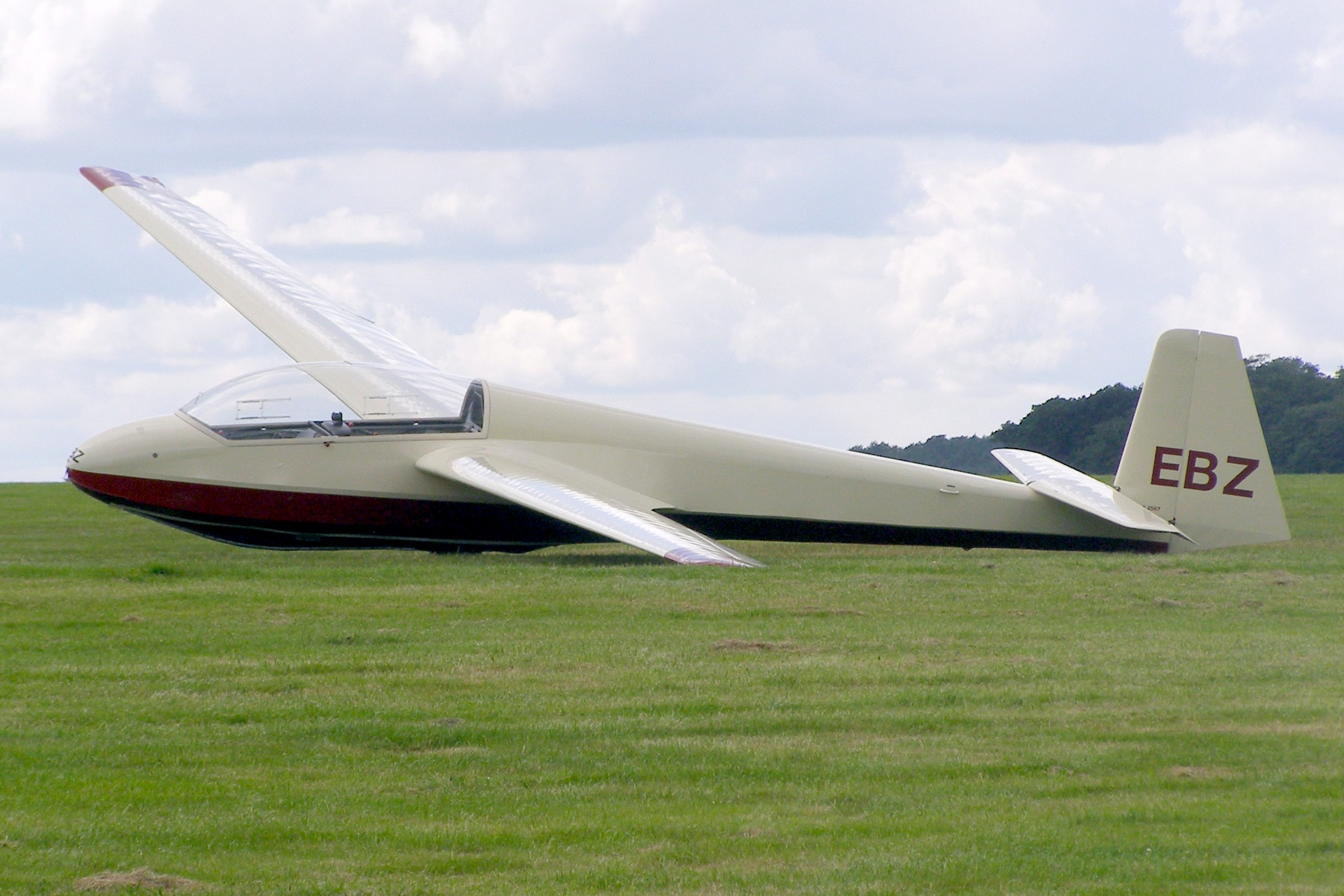
A Schleicher ASK-13 showing the glider trigraph EBZ issued by the British Gliding Association

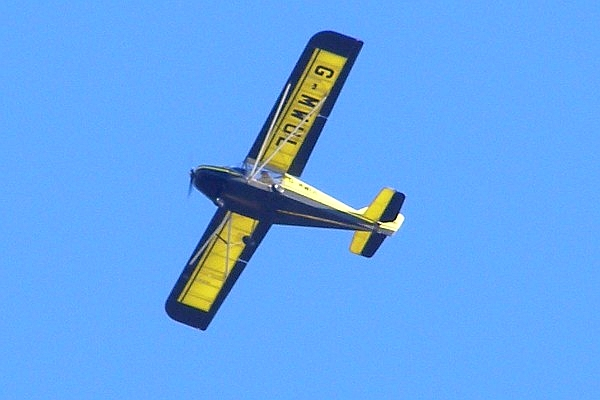
G-MWUL is a microlight registration from 1991

A United Kingdom aircraft registration is a means of identification for British owned and operated commercial and private aircraft. All such aircraft are identified by an aircraft registration starting with the prefix G-.

== Registration ==
An aircraft registration is a unique alphanumeric string that identifies a civil aircraft, in similar fashion to a number plate on a vehicle. The letter Q has not been used since the issue of G-EBTQ in 1927 (although a few historic aircraft still maintain registrations with this letter), and the CAA also disallows combinations that may be offensive. In accordance with the Convention on International Civil Aviation all aircraft must be registered with a national aviation authority and they must carry proof of this registration in the form of a legal document called a Certificate of Registration at all times when in operation.

The register is maintained by the United Kingdom Civil Aviation Authority.

== Temporary register 1919 ==
Although aircraft had been flown in the United Kingdom since 1908 they were not registered and were not required to carry any external markings. The principle of registering and externally marking aircraft had been agreed upon in 1910 at an international convention in Paris and a draft Air Navigation Order had been prepared in 1911, but was not put into force before the First World War.

With the end of the First World War the Air Navigation Regulations came into force on 20 April 1919, allowing civil flying to commence on 1 May 1919. The regulation stated that all aircraft must carry registration marks and any passenger-carrying aircraft must have a certificate of airworthiness. The International Air Navigation Conference in Paris had not concluded, so a temporary system was started; former military aircraft would retain military registration, and any new or re-built aircraft would be registered in a sequence starting with K-100. The first civil flight under the new regulations took place on 1 May 1919 when a de Havilland DH.9 of Aircraft Transport and Travel flew from Hounslow to Bournemouth using former military serial C6054 as an identity. The "K series" registrations allocated were in the range K-100 to K-175, with K-169 being the highest known to have been used.

== First permanent register 1919-1929 ==
The Paris International Conference had allocated the British Empire the prefix G followed by four other letters. The United Kingdom decided to use the G-Exxx sequence for heavier-than-air aircraft (for example G-EAAA) and "G-Fxxx" for lighter-than-air aircraft. The new register came into force on 22 July 1919; aircraft flying on temporary former military serials and those allotted in the K-100 sequence were all re-registered sequentially from G-EAAA.

- G-EAAA to G-EZZZ Heavier-than-air aircraft.
  - G-EAAA to G-EBZZ and G-EDCA were allocated.
- G-FAAA to G-FZZZ Lighter-than-air aircraft.
  - G-FAAA to G-FAAX were allocated.
- G-AUAA to G-AUZZ was allocated to Australia (1921–1929) replaced by VH-xxx.
- G-CAAA to G-CAZZ was allocated to Canada (1920–1929) replaced by CF-xxx.
- G-CYAA to G-CYZZ was allocated to Canada for government and military aircraft (1920–1929).
- G-IAAA to G-IAZZ was allocated to India (1920–1928) replaced by VT-xxx.
- G-NZAA to G-NZZZ was allocated to New Zealand (1921–1929) replaced by ZK-xxx.
- G-UAAA to G-UAZZ was allocated to the Union of South Africa (1927–1929) replaced by ZS-xxx.

== Second permanent register 1928- ==
At the 1927 International Radio-Telegraph Conference the United Kingdom was allocated radio callsign prefixes B, G, M, VP, VQ and VR. Within this new allocation the United Kingdom continued to use the prefix G- for all aircraft but the sequence was restarted at G-AAAA, which continued into the 21st century. The first registration in the sequence, G-AAAA, was allocated to a de Havilland Gipsy Moth, registered on 30 July 1928 to Geoffrey de Havilland. At first nearly all registrations were issued in sequential alphabetical order but since the 1970s personalised ("out of sequence") registrations are available using any four-letter combination. Except in very rare circumstances, no registration is ever re-issued to a different aircraft. Countries in the British Empire that had used the G- prefix were allocated new two-letter allocations.

The oldest flyable aircraft in the world as of 2011, a Humber-built Bleriot XI from 1909 owned by the Shuttleworth Collection in the UK, still uses the very early form registration G-AANG.

=== Microlights ===
From 1981 until 1998 most microlights were registered in the G-MBAA/MZZZ sequence but that system was officially discontinued and microlights have since been registered with any unused suffix.

=== Gliders ===
In 1937 the sequence G-GAAA to G-GAAE was used for five gliders to operate in an international competition in Germany.

To comply with the regulations of the European Aviation Safety Agency, all gliders have had to be registered and marked externally in the G-xxxx sequence since 2008, except for a small group of specified vintage types known by the name of the EASA document, Annex 2.

From 1930 to 2008, existing gliders did not need to be registered in the G- sequence but were recorded on a separate register held by the British Gliding Association. (Newly built gliders from 2003 were G- registered immediately.) The BGA register started in numerical sequence with BGA.101. Although gliders were always marked externally by the BGA numbers, these registrations were usually displayed in very small characters. Later the BGA also issued a three-letter code (called a trigraph) in sequence with the BGA number and this started with the lowest numbered glider still extant, BGA231 an Abbott-Baynes Scud II, being "AAA". When the majority of British gliders were registered in 2008, the G- registration often was derived from the trigraph letters preceded by G-C- or G-D-, though there were many personalised registrations issued which did not follow this pattern.

In addition to the registration many gliders still show a large trigraph or competition number on the fin and on the underside of a wing. The 'comp' numbers are also issued by the BGA. These consisted of three-digit numbers at first but later could be any three alpha-numeric characters. The comp number or the trigraph is usually the most visible marking on a British glider.

=== Hovercraft ===
Air cushion vehicles were allocated registrations with the prefix 'GH-', e.g., GH-2012, the BHC SR.N6 that carried out the first hovercraft expedition up the Amazon, and the Mountbatten-class SR.N4's GH-2006 Princess Margaret and GH-2004 Swift.

=== Toy balloons ===
From 1982 the sequence G-FYAA to G-FYNA was used for unmanned toy balloons.

=== Concorde ===
A special sequence was allocated for Concorde aircraft to allow the use of the aircraft on internal services in the United States by the former US-based airline, Braniff International Airways. For example, the former G-BOAC was re-registered as G-N81AC so on arrival at Washington-Dulles, the 'G' could be covered up and the United States registration N-81AC could be used for internal flights.

== See also ==
- United Kingdom aircraft test serials
- United Kingdom military aircraft registration mark
