= Expeditionary Air Wing =

Expeditionary wings of the Royal Air Force

On 1 April 2006 Expeditionary Air Wings (EAWs) were formed at nine of the RAF's Main Operating Bases. Each EAW has its own identity and is led by the Station Commander, supported by their Station management team. The deployable elements of the station structures form the core of each EAW, reinforced by elements of the Air Combat Service Support Units (ACSSUs). Flying and Force Protection force elements are attached to meet the requirements of each operation. EAWs enable the RAF to train as cohesive air power units which are prepared and capable of transitioning quickly from peacetime structures and deploying swiftly on operations in tailored packages.

== UK based wings ==
=== Current wings ===
==== No. 34 EAW ====
- RAF Waddington (ISTAR)
- Previously located at RAF Lyneham; deployed between May and December 2016 to NSA Souda Bay supporting Operation Shader.

==== No. 38 EAW ====
- 38 EAW is an Air Mobility specialist EAW composed of personnel from RAF Brize Norton and RAF Northolt.
- Deployed to Barbados on Operation Ruman 9 September 17 to support Hurricane Irma relief efforts in the Caribbean. 38 EAW comprised
  - Elements of No. XXIV Squadron. (38 EAW was commanded by OC of No. 24 Squadron).
  - Elements of No. 47 Squadron RAF with Lockheed Hercules C4/C5.
  - Elements of No. LXX Squadron RAF with Airbus Atlas C1.
  - Elements of No. 99 Squadron RAF with Boeing C-17 Globemaster III.
  - Elements of No 1 Air Mobility Wing

==== No. 121 EAW ====
- No. 121 Expeditionary Air Wing at RAF Coningsby
- Deployed to RAF Akrotiri from August to November 2013 for Operation Luminous comprised
  - Elements of No. XI Squadron with Eurofighter Typhoon FGR4
  - Elements of No. 8 Squadron with Boeing Sentry AEW1
  - Elements of No. 216 Squadron with Lockheed Tristar
  - Elements of No. 1 Air Control Centre with T101 Radar
  - Elements of No. 4 Force Protection Wing
- Deployed to Ämari Air Base from April to September 2015 for Operation Azotize with Typhoon FGR4

==== No. 135 EAW ====
- No. 135 Expeditionary Air Wing, RAF Leeming
- Deployed to Šiauliai, Lithuania from April to September 2014 for Operation Azotize with Typhoon FGR4
- Deployed to Mihail Kogalniceanu airbase near Constanța, Romania from April to August 2017 under Operation Biloxi with four Typhoon FGR4s of No. 3 (Fighter) Squadron.
- Deployed to Mihail Kogalniceanu airbase near Constanta, Romania in April 2018 under Operation Biloxi with four Typhoon FGR4s of No.1 (Fighter) Squadron and No. II (Army Cooperation) Squadron.
- Deployed to Šiauliai, Lithuania from April to September 2019 for Operation Azotize with Typhoon FGR4 of No. 6 Squadron.

==== No. 138 EAW ====
- RAF Marham
- Believed to have deployed to West Africa in 2014 for Operation Turus with Panavia Tornado GR4

==== No. 140 EAW ====
- RAF Lossiemouth
- Deployed to RAF Akrotiri from August to December 2014 for Operation Shader, succeeded by 903 EAW, comprised
  - Elements of the RAF Tornado Force (Tornado GR4 strike aircraft)
  - Elements of the RAF Air Mobility Force:
    - Hercules C5 transport aircraft
    - Voyager KC3 tanker aircraft
- Deployed to Ämari Air Base from April to September 2016 for Operation Azotize with Typhoon FGR4

=== Former wings ===
- No. 122 EAW - RAF Cottesmore (Fighter / Ground Attack) - stood down in 2012
- No. 125 EAW - RAF Leuchars (Fighter) - stood down in 2013
- No. 325 EAW - RAF Kinloss (Maritime Patrol & Surveillance) - stood down in 2013

== Deployed Wings ==
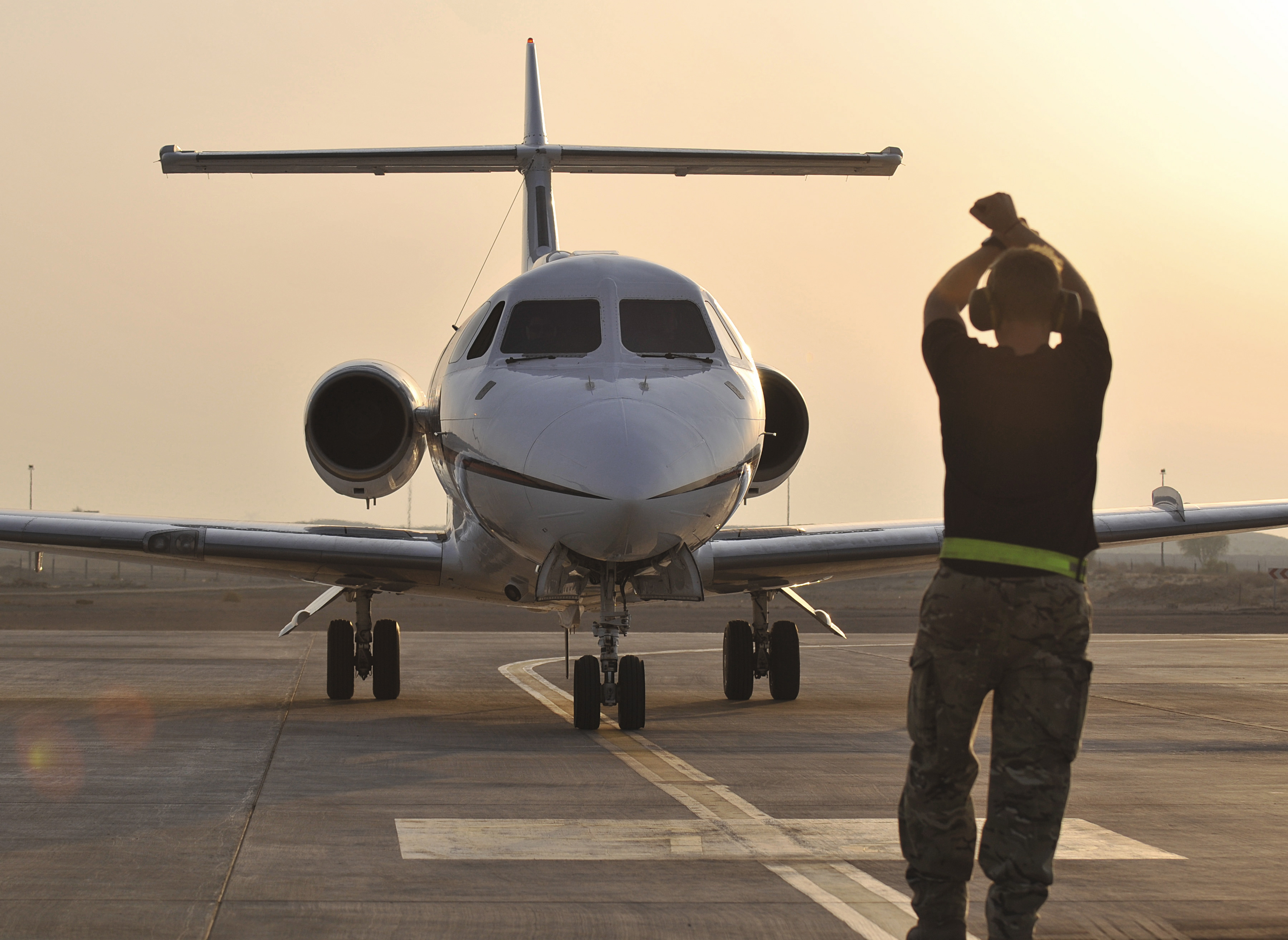
Visiting Aircraft Section (VASS) from 901 Expeditionary Air Wing marshalling a No. 32 Squadron RAF BAe 125 aircraft in the Middle East.

Most of the deployed EAWs are located in the Middle East.

=== No. 901 Expeditionary Air Wing ===
As of 2017, the wing was located at Al Udeid Air Base, providing support to Headquarters No. 83 Expeditionary Air Group and Headquarters Joint Force Communication and Information Systems (Middle East).

Previously as a Middle Eastern EAW it comprised "A" Flight, at a not-publicly known location [likely to be Al Udeid, Qatar], flying Lockheed Hercules C4; "B" Flight (unknown location [likely to be Mussanah, Oman], reformed in 2013 as unknown) flying the Boeing C-17A Globemaster III; and "C" Flight (disbanded March 2015) at Bahrain International Airport flying a mix of BAe125s and BAe146s from No. 32 (The Royal) Squadron.

During the Second World War, No. 901 Wing formed part of No. 224 Group RAF, Third Tactical Air Force. It was formed on 1 October 1944 at Chiringa in British India. At the time of its formation, 901 Wing consisted of two Squadrons: 177 and 211 Squadron, both of which flew Bristol Beaufighter twin-engined fighter-bombers. The Wing was renamed No 901 (Tactical) Wing with effect from 1 December 1944. The Wing continued to operate up to four squadrons equipped with Beaufighters and de Havilland Mosquitoes during 1944-45.

=== No. 902 EAW ===
- RAFO Musannah in support of Operation Kipion (May 2015 – present):
  - 2 x AgustaWestland Merlin HM.2 helicopters.
- Previous:
  - During 2008: Muscat International Airport, Oman.
    - Hawker Siddeley Nimrod MR2 & R1
  - October 2013: Unknown deployed location suspected to be Muscat International Airport, Oman.
    - Sentinel R1 Airborne Stand Off Radar (ASTOR) aircraft from No. V (Army Cooperation) Squadron

=== No. 903 EAW ===
- RAF Akrotiri in support of Operation Shader (14 December 2014 – present):
  - Elements of the RAF Typhoon Force (9 x Typhoon FGR4 multirole fighter aircraft)
  - Elements of the RAF Air Mobility Force:
    - Airbus A400M Atlas transport aircraft (replaced previously operated Hercules C5 aircraft withdrawn from RAF service in 2023)
    - Voyager KC3 tanker aircraft
  - Elements of the RAF ISTAR Force:
    - MQ-9A Reaper UAVs (No. 13 Squadron RAF) and RC-135W Rivet Joint (No. 51 Squadron RAF) (aircraft may operate from locations other than RAF Akrotiri)
    - Shadow R1 aircraft from No. 14 Squadron RAF
    - 2 x Sentinel R1 ISTAR aircraft from No. V(Army Cooperation) Squadron (all withdrawn from service 2021)
    - 2 x Sentry AEW1 AEW&C aircraft from No. 8 Squadron (aircraft withdrawn from service 2021)
  - Elements of the RAF Support Force.
- Previous
  - Elements of the RAF Tornado Force (10 x Tornado GR4 strike aircraft) (Retired 2019)
  - Contingency Operating Base Basra/Basra Airport, Iraq for Operation Telic (2003- 2009).
  - Camp Bastion, Afghanistan for Operation Herrick (2009-2014)

=== No. 906 EAW ===
- Al Minhad Air Base, United Arab Emirates (15 January 2013 – present):
- Previous:
  - Gioia del Colle Air Base, Italy in support of Operation Ellamy (2011) comprising
    - 10 × Eurofighter Typhoon multirole fighters from RAF Coningsby and RAF Lossiemouth,
    - 16 × Tornado GR4 interdictor/strike aircraft from RAF Marham

=== British Forces South Atlantic Islands ===
==== No. 905 EAW ====
- RAF Mount Pleasant, Falkland Islands (1 April 2006 – present)
  - No. 1312 Flight RAF
    - Airbus A400M Atlas
    - Voyager KC2
      - Previously VC10 and Tristar
  - No. 1435 Flight RAF
    - 4 x Eurofighter Typhoon
      - Previously Panavia Tornado F3s
- Previous:Unknown

=== Disbanded Wings ===
==== No. 904 EAW ====
- Kandahar Airfield, Afghanistan for Operation Herrick (2006-2015).
  - Harrier aircraft (eight aircraft, with eleven crews) 2009

==== No. 907 EAW ====
- RAF Akrotiri in support of Operation Ellamy (2011) comprising
  - 3 × Sentry AEW1 AWACS aircraft from RAF Waddington
  - 1 x Nimrod R1 signals intelligence aircraft from No 51 Squadron – operational requirements forced the Royal Air Force to deploy one of its two remaining Nimrod R1s two weeks before they were due to be withdrawn.
  - 1 x Sentinel R1 airborne standoff radar aircraft from No V(Army Cooperation) Squadron

== See also ==
- RAF Advanced Air Striking Force
