= RAF Mount Pleasant =

Royal Air Force station in the Falkland Islands

RAF Mount Pleasant
- Near Stanley, East Falkland in the Falkland Islands
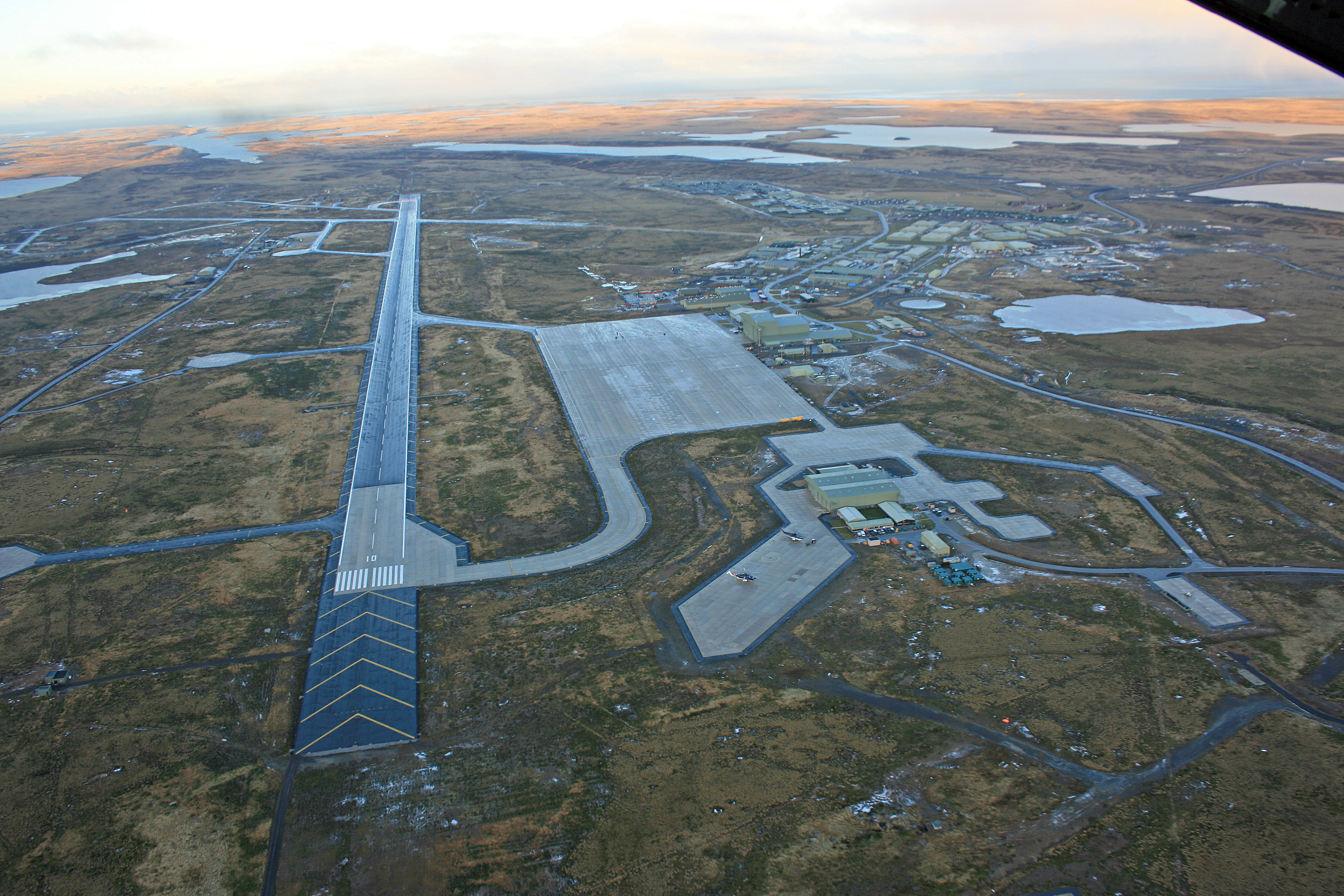
- Aerial view of RAF Mount Pleasant

- Defend the Right

Site information
- Type: Permanent Joint Operating Base
- Owner: Ministry of Defence
- Operator: Royal Air Force
- Controlled by: British Forces South Atlantic Islands
- Condition: Operational
- Website: Official website

Location
- Location in Falkland Islands RAF Mount Pleasant (South America)
- Coordinates: 51°49′22″S 058°26′50″W

Site history
- Built: 1985
- In use: 1985–present

Garrison information
- Occupants: No. 905 Expeditionary Air Wing; No. 1312 Flight; No. 1435 Flight

Airfield information
- Identifiers: IATA: MPN, ICAO: EGYP, WMO: 88889
- Elevation: 71.1 metres (233 ft) AMSL
Runways
Direction	Length and surface
10/28	2,589 metres (8,494 ft) Asphalt concrete
05/23	1,525 metres (5,003 ft) Asphalt concrete
- Source: UK Military Aeronautical Information Publication – Mount Pleasant (EGYP)

RAF Mount Pleasant (IATA: MPN, ICAO: EGYP) (also known as Mount Pleasant Airport, Mount Pleasant Complex or MPA) is a Royal Air Force station in the British Overseas Territory of the Falkland Islands. The airfield goes by the motto of "Defend the right" (while the motto of the islands is "Desire the right") and is part of the British Forces South Atlantic Islands (BFSAI). Home to between 1,000 and 2,000 British military personnel, it is about 33 miles (53 km) southwest of Stanley, the capital of the Falklands, on the island of East Falkland.

Mount Pleasant was opened by Prince Andrew on 12 May 1985, becoming fully operational the following year. The station was constructed as part of British efforts to strengthen the defence of the Falkland Islands following the Falklands War. It remains the newest purpose-built RAF station and replaced previous RAF facilities at Port Stanley Airport.

== History ==
=== Falklands War ===
RAF Mount Pleasant is the newest permanent airfield in the Royal Air Force. The RAF previously had a small airfield at Port Stanley Airport after the end of the hostilities in 1982. During the Falklands War when the islands were occupied by Argentine military forces, British aircraft were sent to disable the runway with RAF Strike Command Vulcan bombers (Operation Black Buck) and Royal Navy Sea Harriers. The first two Black Buck missions were flown under tactics to make it reasonably probable at least one of twenty-one 1,000-pound bombs dropped would hit the target. On the first mission one 1,000-pound (450 kg) bomb hit the edge of the runway. The damage was easily repaired by Argentine engineers. C-130 Hercules transport aircraft were able to bring in supplies and take out casualties until the end of the conflict using one side of the runway. Pucará, Fokkers and Aermacchi AM-339 fast-jet fighters also operated from the runway from the first until the last day of the campaign. The second Black Buck mission failed to hit the runway. Argentine aircraft were moved north to the mainland to defend Buenos Aires. At the end of hostilities, the runway was fully repaired by British military engineers.

After the surrender of the Argentine ground forces on the islands, the British still faced the problem of potential Argentine air attacks from Argentina, so an aircraft carrier had to remain on station to guard the islands with its squadron of Sea Harriers until the local airfield was prepared for jet aircraft. HMS Hermes was the first to take guard duty, whilst HMS Invincible went north to change a main engine at sea. Invincible then returned to relieve Hermes which urgently needed to return to the UK for boiler cleaning. Invincible returned until she was relieved by the newly built HMS Illustrious, which was quickly rushed south and commissioned during the journey. Once the Port Stanley runway was available for jets, Illustrious was relieved by 23 Squadron operating the F-4 Phantom FGR.2. Initially stationed at RAF Stanley, the unit moved to Mount Pleasant upon its opening.

=== Construction ===
In order to deter further Argentina, the British Government considered it necessary to enhance the military presence in the Falklands. However, the temporary military airfield at RAF Stanley was restricted by the length and strength of its runway. Therefore, in June 1983, the British Government announced that a new military airfield would be constructed at Mount Pleasant, the option being considered to be more cost effective and straightforward than upgrading RAF Stanley. It would also allow RAF Stanley to remain operational whilst the new airfield was constructed.

The Ministry of Defence reached a voluntary agreement to purchase 8,300 acres (3,400 ha) of farmland for £55,000, with severance compensation assessed at £100,000. To allow existing agricultural operations to continue, Mount Pleasant House and other farm facilities were relocated at a cost of £83,877.

The airfield at Mount Pleasant was constructed by Mowlem-Laing Amey Roadstone Construction, a consortium of British civil engineering and construction firms Mowlem, John Laing Group and Amey plc. At the construction stage the airfield was called the Falkland Island Strategic Airfield or FISA and was designed to accommodate military as well as civil wide-body aircraft, enabling efficiencies in the running costs and time taken to support the Falklands garrison. The construction and shipping of materials to the Falklands was expected to cost approximately £190 million. Additional costs included the provision of a road between Stanley and Mount Pleasant and the installation of communication and navigation aids, bringing the overall cost to approximately £215m. Construction began in Autumn 1983 and the new runway was expected to be available for use by April 1985, with the wider airfield complete by February 1986.

RAF Mount Pleasant was opened by the then Prince Andrew (later Andrew Mountbatten-Windsor), who had seen active duty during the Falklands War while serving in the Fleet Air Arm) on 12 May 1985 and became fully operational on 1 May 1986.

=== Protecting the Falklands ===
Mount Pleasant's first flying unit, No. 23 Squadron, equipped with four McDonnell Douglas Phantom FGR.2, arrived from RAF Stanley on 21 April 1986. The Phantoms were joined by No. 78 Squadron on 22 May 1986, which was reformed from the former No. 1310 Flight, operating the Boeing Chinook HC1 and No. 1564 Flight, operating the Westland Sea King HAR3. Later in 1986, two Lockheed C-130 Hercules C1K of No. 1312 Flight, operating in the air-to-air refuelling role, moved to Mount Pleasant to support the Phantoms.

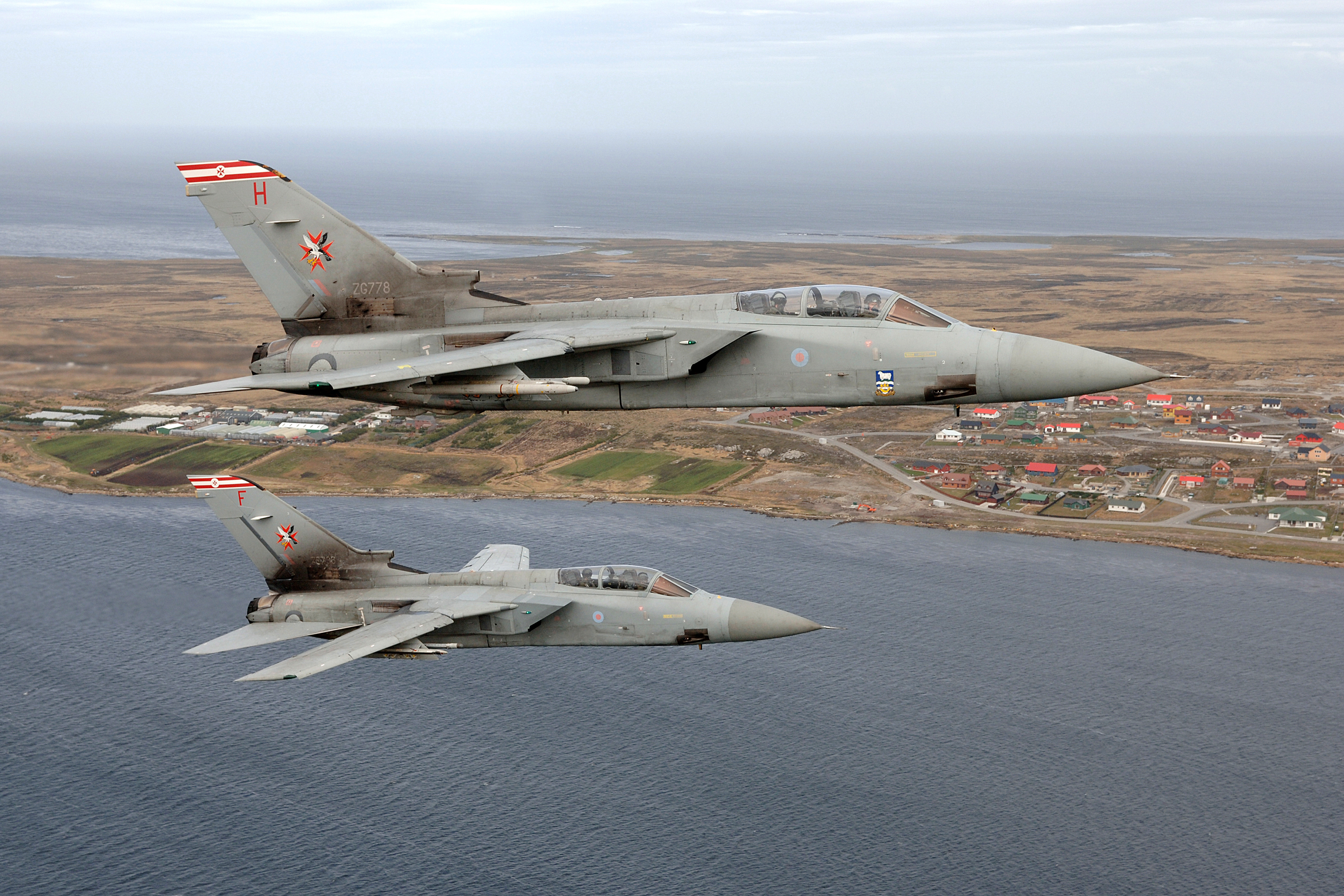
Two Panavia Tornado F3 of No. 1435 Flight patrolling the skies over the Falkland Islands.

Responsibility for the air-defence and of the Falklands and the Phantoms of No. 23 Squadron were transferred to No. 1435 Flight on 1 November 1988. Subsequently, the flight's Phantoms were replaced when four Panavia Tornado F3 arrived in the Falklands in July 1992.

No. 1312 Flight's Hercules C1K were withdrawn in April 1996, with the flight gaining a Vickers VC10 K4 for air-to-air refuelling and C-130 Hercules C3 in the transport role.

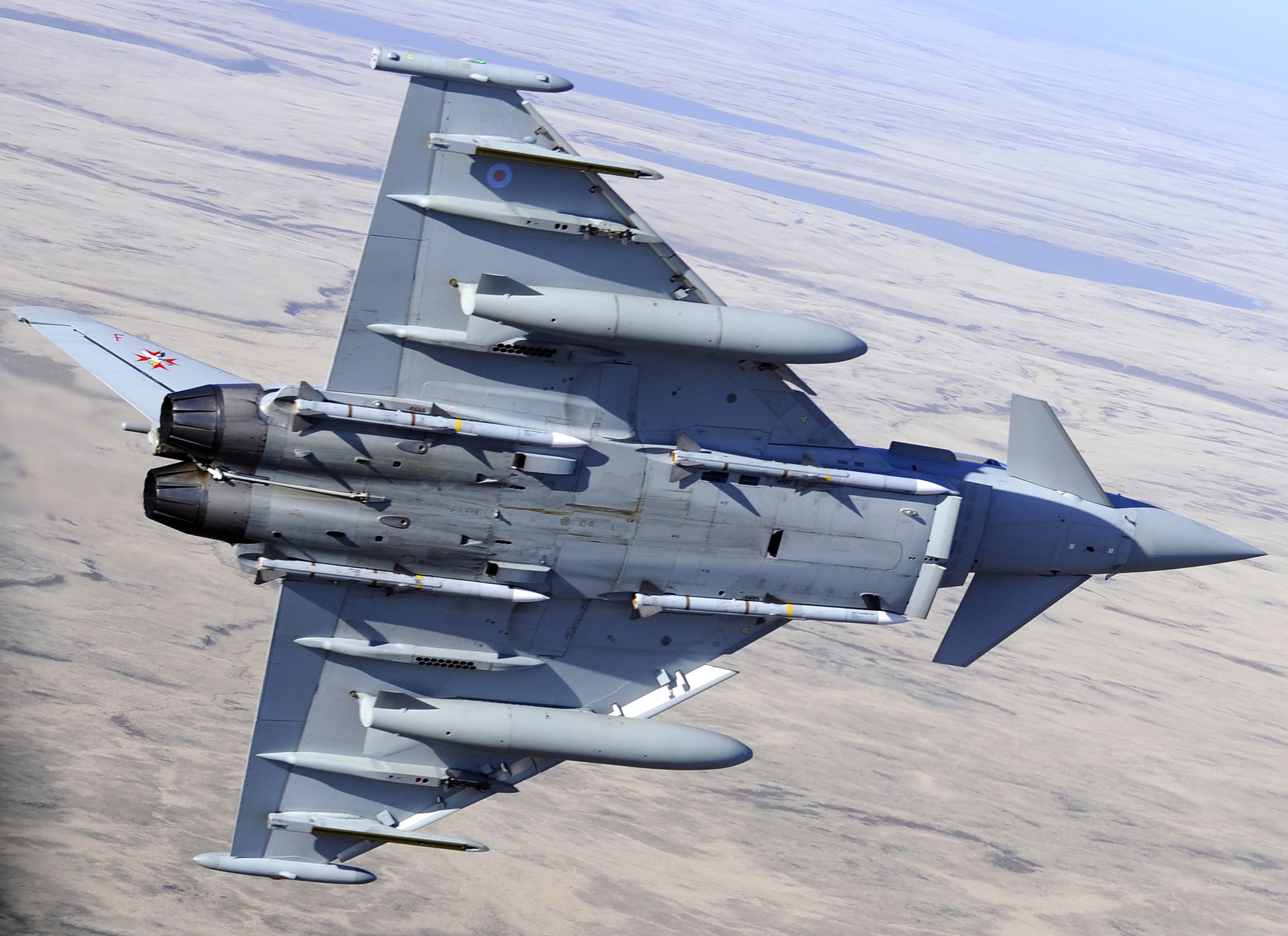
Typhoon FGR4 of 1435 Flight

In September 2009, the Falklands' air-defence capability was enhanced when No. 1435 Flight's Tornado F3s were replaced by the Eurofighter Typhoon FGR4 in the quick reaction alert (QRA) role, at a cost of £1.56 million. To accommodate the Typhoon, a further £416,000 was spent on infrastructure improvements to the airfield. As of 2024, the Tranche 1 variant of the Typhoon is deployed in the islands.

As part of the RAF's wider upgrade of their Hercules, the C3 variant of No. 1312 Flight was replaced with a C-130J C5 in April 2010. A Lockheed TriStar K1 took over the air-to-air refuelling role from the VC10 K4 in October 2013, when the latter was withdrawn from RAF service. The TriStar itself was soon replaced, in February 2014, by an Airbus A330 Voyager KC3.

Chinook helicopters provided heavy-lift support until they were withdrawn in 2006. In 2015, the Chinooks were redeployed to Mount Pleasant. A flight of Westland Sea King helicopters for support and search and rescue was located at Mount Pleasant from November 2007 until April 2016.

Prince William served as a Sea King pilot on the station for six weeks during February and March 2012.

As of 1 April 2016, with the retirement of Westland Sea King the Islands' search and rescue function has been replaced by a commercial organisation, AAR, subcontracting the services to British International Helicopters for 10 years using two new AgustaWestland AW189s.

1312 Flight's Lockheed Martin C-130 Hercules, used for transport, search and rescue, and maritime patrol, was replaced with an Airbus A400M Atlas C1 in April 2018.

== Facilities ==
Mount Pleasant Complex has a wide range of social and sporting facilities including a gym and sports pitches. As of August 2010, it has the only cricket ground in the Falklands. There are two NAAFI shops, a medical centre, and an education centre on the base. BFBS Radio also maintains a live local station on the site. There is also a complex that includes a small shop which is owned and run by the Falkland Islands Company.

The world's longest corridor, 2,600 feet (800 m) long, links the barracks, messes, and recreational and welfare areas of the station, and was nicknamed the "Death Star Corridor" by personnel due to its drab and foreboding ambience, before it was re-designed, re-painted, and re-named "Millennium Corridor" by a team of artists, designers and students from Duncan of Jordanstone College of Art & Design led by Professor Elaine Shemilt, in 2002. They had been invited by the then current CBFI (Commander Britsh Forces Falkland Islands), Brigadier David Nicholls.

== Role and operations ==
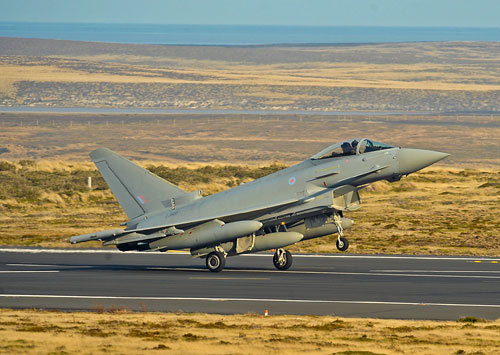
A Eurofighter Typhoon FGR4 landing at RAF Mount Pleasant in 2009. As of 2024, the Tranche 1 variant of the Typhoon is deployed in the islands.

The station provides a base for air-defence and transport operations in the south Atlantic and is home to No. 905 Expeditionary Air Wing, part of British Forces South Atlantic Islands. The wing comprises two RAF flights, which operate a range of aircraft:

- Four Eurofighter Typhoon Tranche 1s are operated by No. 1435 Flight which provides air defence for the Falklands, South Sandwich Islands and South Georgia.
- No. 1312 Flight operates an Airbus Voyager KC2 which is used for air-to-air refuelling and transportation. The Voyager works alongside an Airbus A400M Atlas C1 providing tactical transport, maritime patrol, search and rescue and humanitarian assistance capabilities.

Previously No. 1310 Flight operated two Chinook HC.4 helicopters., but as of 2022, Chinooks are no longer based in the Falklands.

Additionally, the civilian firm, Bristow Helicopters (BIH), operates two Sikorsky S-92 for personnel and equipment transport and also flies two AgustaWestland AW189s for search and rescue operations.

The British Army maintains a garrison on the Falkland Islands based at Mount Pleasant. It includes a roulement infantry company, an air defence surface-to-air missile unit (SAM "Sky Sabre"), an Explosive Ordnance Disposal detachment, engineers and supporting elements.

There is also a Joint Communications Unit (JCU) providing the electronic warfare and command and control systems for the Royal Navy, British Army and RAF.

== Based units ==
Units based at Mount Pleasant Complex.

Royal Air Force

- No. 905 Expeditionary Air Wing
  - No. 1312 Flight – 1x Voyager KC2 and 1x A400M Atlas C1
  - No. 1435 Flight – 4x Typhoon Tranche 1

British Army

- Infantry
  - Falkland Islands Roulement Infantry Company
- Royal Artillery
  - 7th Air Defence Group (Detachment) – Sky Sabre air defence missile system

Royal Navy (Operating from Mare Harbour facilities five miles from the Mount Pleasant complex)

- HMS Medway (operating in the South Atlantic as of 2025/26)

=== Joint service units ===
- Joint Force Logistic Unit
- Base Support Wing
- Joint Communications Unit Falkland Islands
- Joint Service Explosive Ordnance Disposal Unit
- Joint Services Police and Security Unit
- Joint Services Signals Unit

=== Civilian ===
- AAR Corp/Bristow Helicopters (formerly British International Helicopters) - 2x Sikorsky S-92 and 2x AgustaWestland AW189

== Airlines and destinations ==
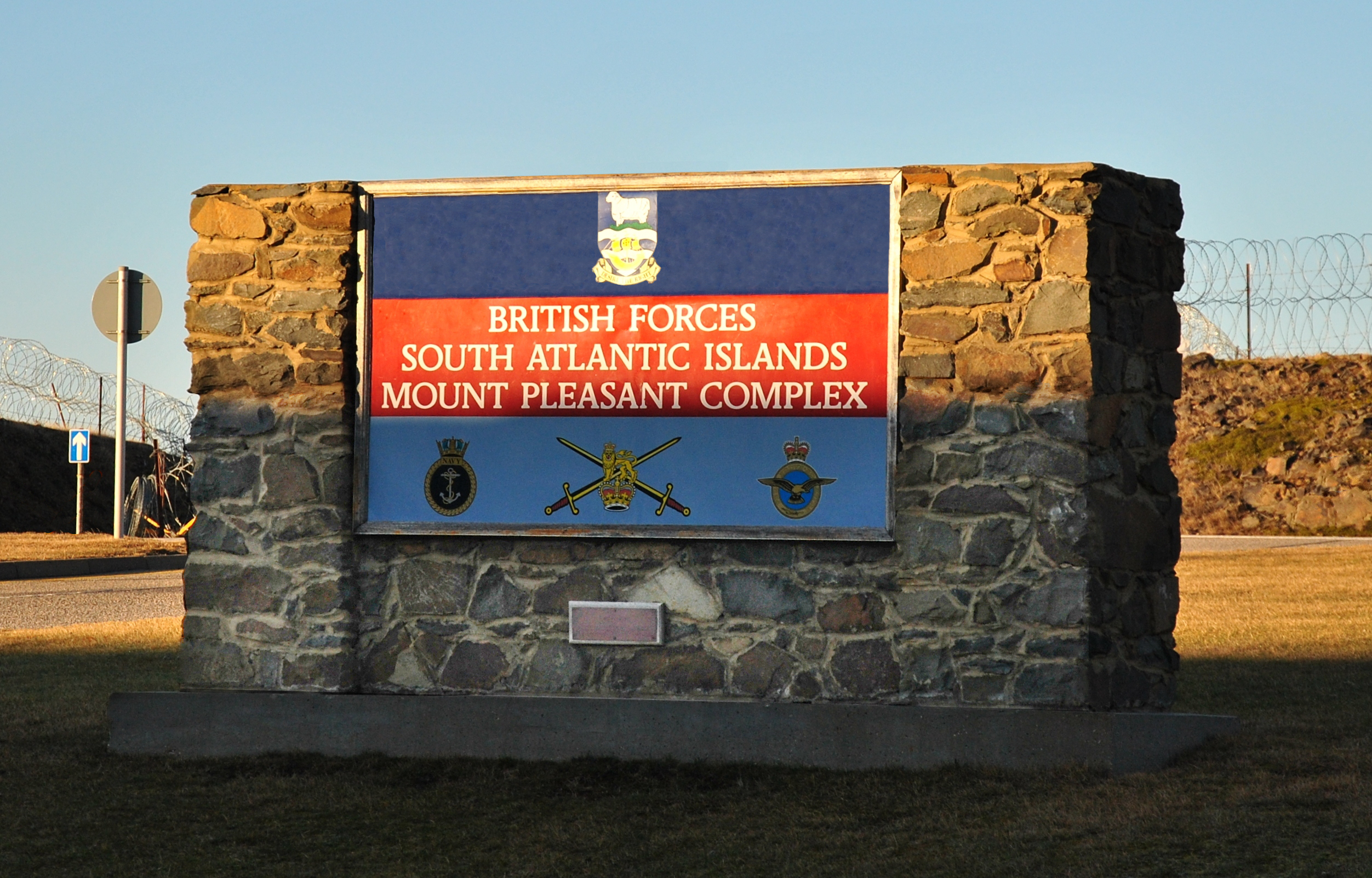
Mount Pleasant Complex entrance sign, outside the air terminal

Using the IATA airport code MPN, Mount Pleasant Complex also acts as the Falkland Islands' only international airport, along with its military role. Flights open to civilian passengers are operated twice each week. The Hercules C-130 Transport Force operating out of RAF Lyneham supplied a direct non-stop service from RAF Lyneham via Ascension, Wideawake Airfield. From Ascension the flight was direct involving in-flight refuelling from a C-130 tanker. The flight duration was usually about 12 hours down and 13 hours back. The last scheduled flight in the world involving in-flight refuelling was carried out by a crew of 24 Squadron in C-130 XV291 during the period 18–23 March 1989. This was the 650th and last of its type carried out by RAF Lyneham C-130s. Flights were then operated directly by the RAF using the Lockheed TriStars of 216 Squadron. Starting in autumn 2008, these flights were operated on behalf of the Royal Air Force by a civilian airline, Flyglobespan. Since the airline's bankruptcy in 2009, the flights have been operated by Air Tahiti Nui, Titan Airways, Air Seychelles and Hi Fly. The service is now operated by AirTanker using Airbus Voyager aircraft. Up to 2022, they flew to and from RAF Brize Norton in Oxfordshire, with a refuelling stop at Cape Verde because the runway at RAF Ascension Island was closed. With the opening of one side of the runway at Ascension in 2022, normal flights could resume. Repairs to both sides of the runway at Ascension Island were fully completed in Spring of 2023.

On 2 March 2012, the Argentinian President Cristina Fernández de Kirchner called for Aerolíneas Argentinas flights to Buenos Aires to replace LATAM Airlines flights to Chile. The idea of flights to Argentina was not supported on the islands, because this might result in Argentina having a monopoly on commercial flights and controlling all commercial air access.

On 2 April 2012, Uruguayan company Air Class Líneas Aéreas gained permission from the Uruguayan Ministry of Defence to start a commercial flight to the Falkland Islands.

By the 2020s, the UK Ministry of Defence was the only operator providing flights to RAF Mount Pleasant: on 8 June 2020, a Voyager aircraft completed a non-stop flight from RAF Brize Norton to RAF Mount Pleasant in 15 hours 9 minutes, a new record.

=== Scheduled ===
Airlines	Destinations
LATAM Chile	Punta Arenas, Rio Gallegos, Santiago de Chile

=== Unscheduled ===
Airlines	Destinations
FIGAS	Stanley, other settlements on the Falklands

== Climate data ==
Climate data for RAF Mount Pleasant, 1999–2012
Month	Jan	Feb	Mar	Apr	May	Jun	Jul	Aug	Sep	Oct	Nov	Dec	Year
Mean daily maximum °C (°F)	15.1 (59.2)	14.7 (58.5)	13.0 (55.4)	9.8 (49.6)	7.0 (44.6)	4.9 (40.8)	4.3 (39.7)	5.5 (41.9)	7.4 (45.3)	10.1 (50.2)	12.0 (53.6)	14.0 (57.2)	9.8 (49.6)
Daily mean °C (°F)	10.9 (51.6)	10.6 (51.1)	9.3 (48.7)	6.8 (44.2)	4.5 (40.1)	2.7 (36.9)	2.2 (36.0)	3.0 (37.4)	4.4 (39.9)	6.4 (43.5)	7.9 (46.2)	9.7 (49.5)	6.5 (43.7)
Mean daily minimum °C (°F)	6.6 (43.9)	6.6 (43.9)	5.5 (41.9)	3.7 (38.7)	2.1 (35.8)	0.5 (32.9)	0.1 (32.2)	0.5 (32.9)	1.3 (34.3)	2.7 (36.9)	3.9 (39.0)	5.5 (41.9)	3.3 (37.9)
Average precipitation days	23	21	23	24	26	26	25	24	21	21	23	23	280
Source: WeatherSpark

== See also ==
- List of Royal Air Force aircraft squadrons
- Mare Harbour
- Military of the Falkland Islands
