= Future Strategic Tanker Aircraft =

British military procurement project

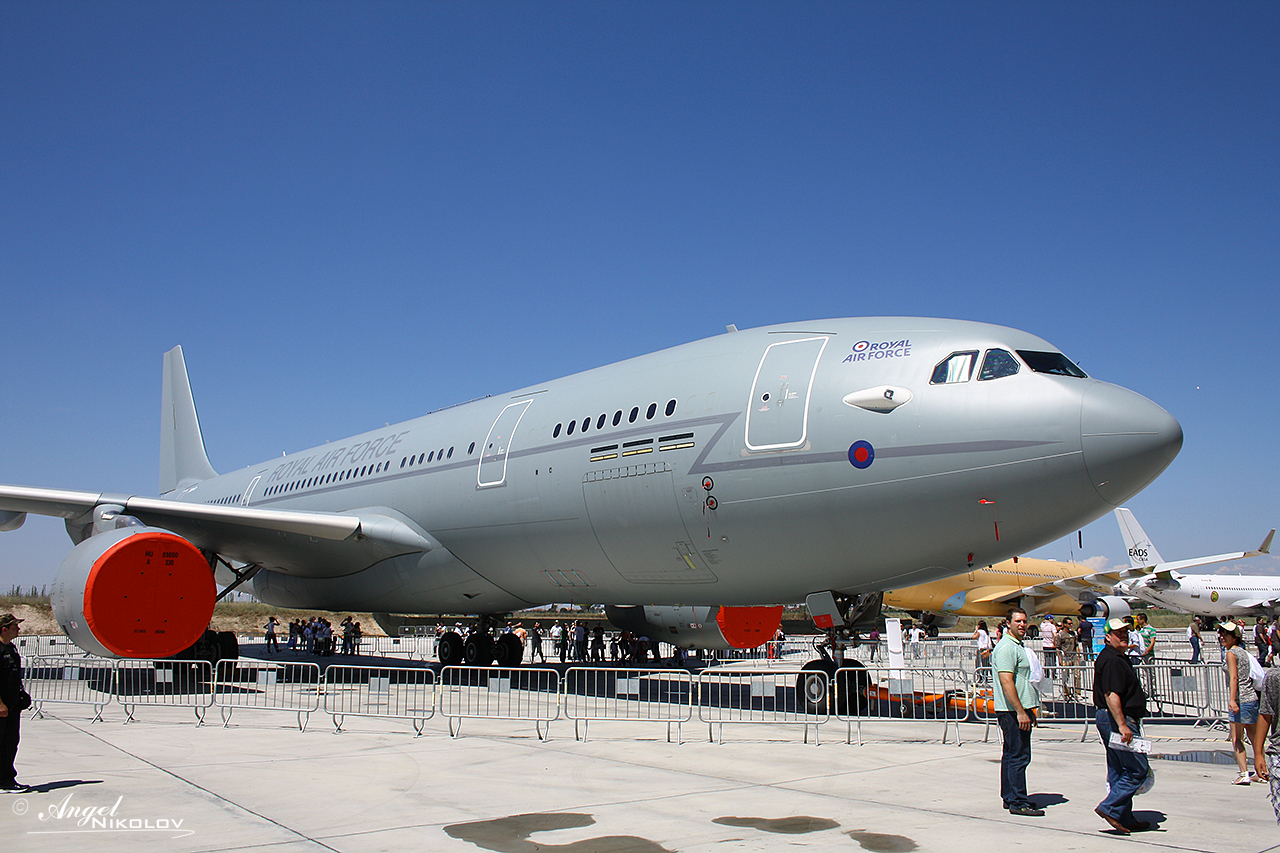
- Royal Air Force Airbus A330-243 at Airbus factory of Getafe, Spain

General information
- Project for: Aerial refuelling tanker aircraft
- Service: Royal Air Force

History
- Outcome: AirTanker Limited's consortium's Airbus A330 MRTT selected
- Predecessors: Lockheed TriStar, Vickers VC10

Future Strategic Tanker Aircraft (FSTA) was the name given to a British project to procure a fleet of Airbus A330 MRTT (Multi-Role Tanker Transport) aerial refuelling (AR) and air transport (AT) aircraft for the Royal Air Force (RAF), to replace their then existing older models such as the Lockheed TriStars and Vickers VC10s.

In 2004, after evaluating the two bids, the Royal Air Force selected the AirTanker consortium, owned by Cobham plc, EADS, Rolls-Royce plc, Thales UK and VT Group plc, who offered the Airbus A330 MRTT.

== Background ==
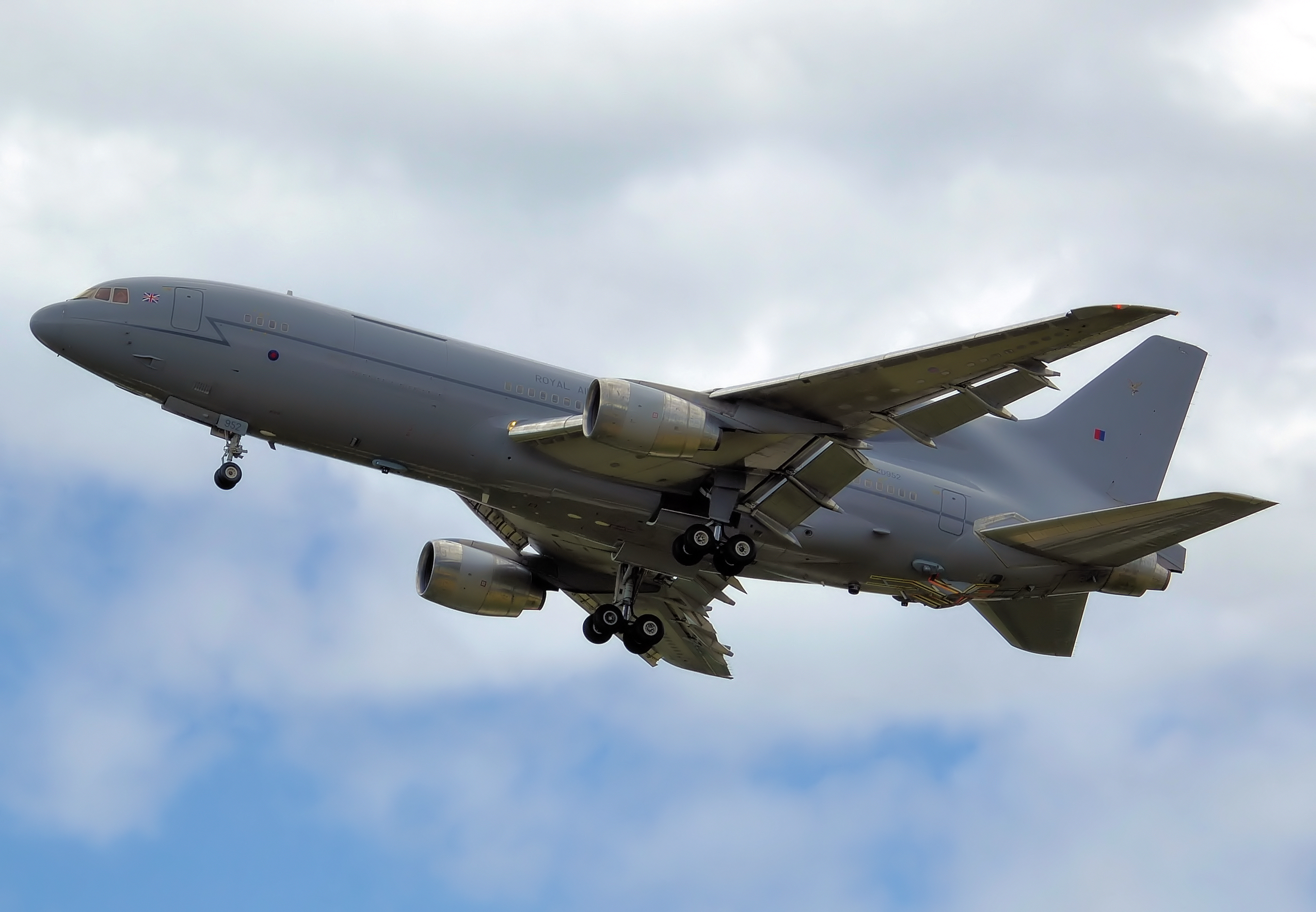
A Royal Air Force Lockheed TriStar, converted L-1011-500 used as tanker-transports for over 20 years by the time of the new programme

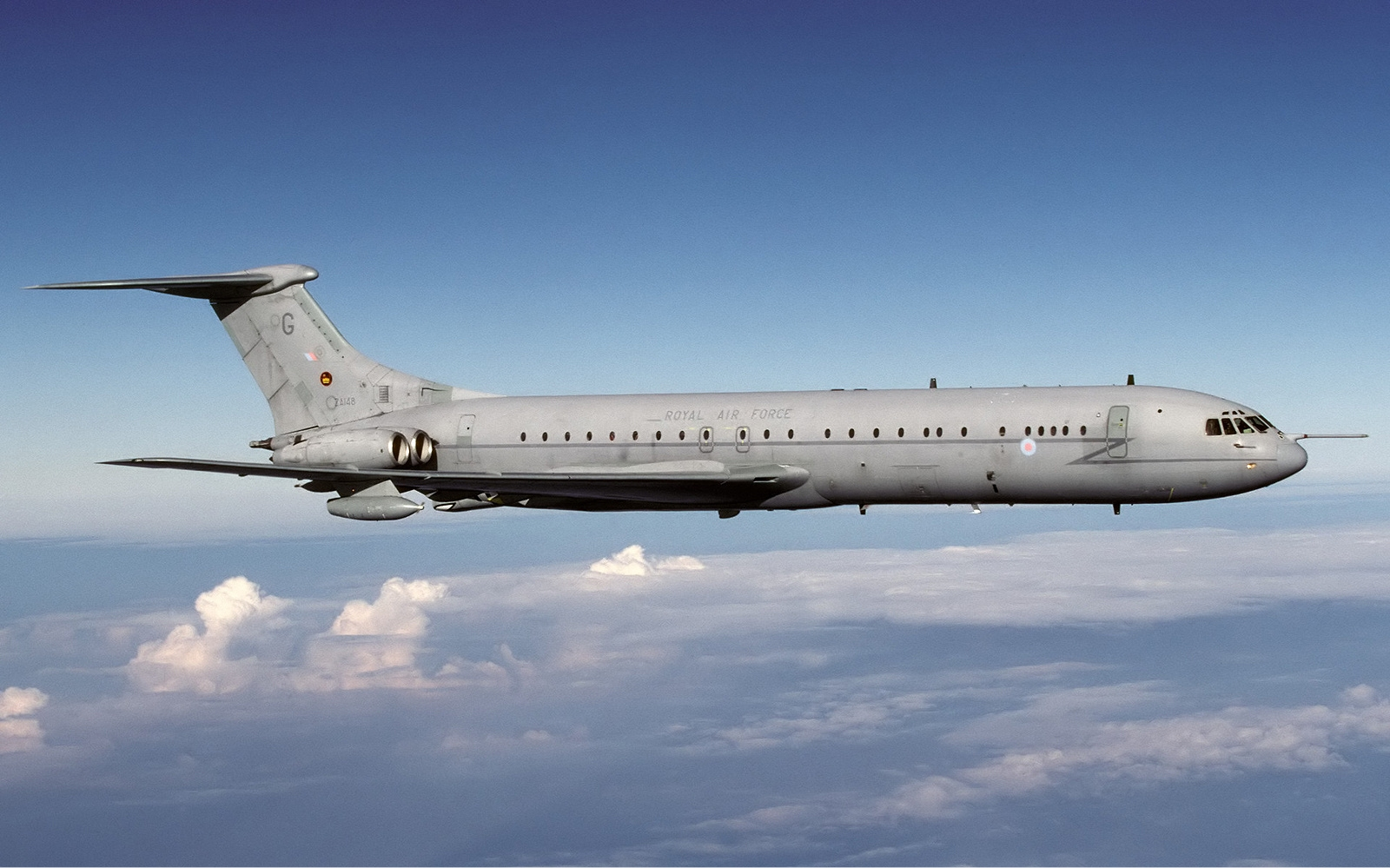
The Vickers VC10 aircraft entered RAF service in 1966

The project was to provide a replacement of the Royal Air Force's fleet of Vickers VC10s from 2008 and the Lockheed TriStars around 2012. The need for a new fleet of air-to-air refuelling aircraft was first identified in 1997. The chosen aircraft were to operate from the same RAF air transport hub, RAF Brize Norton, Oxfordshire as the replaced aircraft.

The use of a Private Finance Initiative (PFI) rather than outright purchase by the Ministry of Defence (MoD) was chosen in 2000. Under the PFI, the Royal Air Force (via the MoD) will pay for aerial refuelling and air transport missions as required. The Royal Air Force will continue to retain responsibility for all military missions, whilst the contractor will own, manage and maintain the aircraft, and also provide training facilities and some personnel. The private company will also be able to earn extra revenue by using aircraft for commercial operations when not required by the Royal Air Force; the most suitable of which would be leased air-refuelling missions for other European air forces. The RAF however will always have the 'first call' on aircraft, being able to mobilise the entire fleet in times of crisis.

=== Competition ===
Final bids for the project were received from the two competing consortia on 30 April 2003.

- Air Tanker Limited offered a mix of new and used Airbus A330-200s, the consortium composed of:
  - Rolls-Royce — Trent 700 turbofans
  - Cobham — aerial refuelling hose and drogue system
  - EADS — Airbus A330-200
  - Thales Group — avionics and training.
- Tanker Transport Services Consortium (TTSC) offered converted British Airways Boeing 767s:
  - British Airways — aircraft
  - Boeing — conversion technology, using the KC-767 as the basis of the design
  - BAE Systems — conversion of majority of aircraft and mission systems
  - Marshall Aerospace
  - Serco
  - Spectrum Capital

=== Selection and contract negotiations ===
The Ministry of Defence (MoD) announced on 26 January 2004 that Air Tanker had been selected to enter into final negotiations to provide the RAF's Future Strategic Tanker Aircraft (FSTA).

Following aircraft selection, the MoD began exclusive negotiations with the AirTanker consortium. However, beginning in April 2004, there were rumours about the fragile state of the contract negotiations. With continuing doubts over the FSTA programme, Marshall Aerospace, responsible for the conversion of the RAF's original TriStars, offered to buy and convert some of the large number of surplus commercial TriStars.

On 28 February 2005, the MoD named AirTanker as its preferred bidder for the £13 billion contract.

== Development ==
The Ministry of Defence announced on 6 June 2007 that AirTanker had been given the approval it needed to continue with the project, allowing the company to seek the £2 billion private financing required to begin funding the aircraft. On 27 March 2008, a PFI deal was agreed with AirTanker, worth £10.5 billion over the course of the contract, and will involve fourteen converted A330-200 aircraft, being delivered from 2011, and being operated until at least 2035. The contract will be paid for at £390 million per annum. Of this, running costs are £80 million, and the remainder covers the consortium's financing and profit and the capital cost of the project, including aircraft and infrastructure.

All aircraft will be equipped with a pair of wing-mounted aerial-refuelling pods, while only seven FSTAs will be fitted for centreline flight refuelling units (FRUs); each conversion will take about nine months. The AirTanker facility is based at RAF Brize Norton, where a two-bay hangar and support building will provide a maintenance facility, flight operations centre and office headquarters for the programme. Lufthansa Technik will provide support, repair, and overhaul services.

The first two development aircraft went through a comprehensive military conversion process and initial flight testing programme at Airbus Military's facility near Madrid. It was intended that the remaining twelve aircraft destined for the FSTA fleet would be converted by Cobham Aviation Services at their facility in Bournemouth, but in June 2012, it was announced that the final ten aircraft would be converted in Spain to ensure that they were delivered on time and to cost. The first aircraft to be converted in the UK arrived at Bournemouth Airport on 26 August 2011. Cobham held a ceremony to formally open the newly refurbished A330 conversion facility in Bournemouth on 2 September 2011. In a naming ceremony at RAF Fairford during the 2011 Royal International Air Tattoo, it was announced that the aircraft will be known as 'Voyager' in RAF service.

In November 2010, it was suggested that the French Air Force might buy spare FSTA capacity.

The first completed aircraft arrived at RAF Brize Norton in December 2011; after a prolonged certification process, it began training flights in April 2012. Following technical issues with the new Cobham-designed High Speed-Variable Drag Drogue when refuelling the Panavia Tornado, the drogues on the wing tip pods were replaced in early 2012 with standard Sargent Fletcher drogues, delaying the Release To Service clearance required to conduct air-to-air refuelling (AAR) operations. Certification was finally granted on 16 May 2013, and the first operational tanker flight launched on 20 May 2013.

The Voyager started test flights refuelling the F-35B in 2015, with certification expected by mid-June 2015. This followed the Australian KC-30 variant completing refuelling trials with the F-35A in late 2015.

== Non-core fleet ==
By May 2014, nine aircraft had been delivered, completing the 'core' fleet of Royal Air Force aircraft. The remaining five aircraft represent a 'surge' capability, available to the RAF when needed, but otherwise available to AirTanker for tasks such as 'release to the civil market, less its military equipment or to partner nations in a military capacity with the MoD's agreement'. In June 2014, Thomas Cook Airlines entered into an agreement to lease one of the five surge aircraft from AirTanker. The aircraft will differ from the Voyager fleet by having 32 more seats, different seats with in flight video, and they will receive Thomas Cook livery.

== Financial reviews ==
In March 2010, the National Audit Office (NAO) published a review of the scheme, which was unable to conclude that the Ministry of Defence achieved value for money. Despite managing the later stages of the procurement well, the MOD's ability to get the best deal it could was undermined by shortcomings in the way it conducted the procurement and assessed alternative options. Although the project to provide air-to-air refuelling and military transport aircraft has achieved its delivery milestones since contract signature, it is still likely to be delivered five and a half years later than planned. However, all the follow-on milestones have been achieved on or ahead schedule, and in particular the delivery of each of the fourteen aircraft. The FSTA programme has been the first UK aircraft programme delivering on schedule and on budget since World War 2.

The Public Accounts Committee (PAC) found that the aircraft specification did not feature the adequate protection required for flights into Afghanistan, and would therefore mean the Lockheed TriStar would continue to fulfil this role until 2016. This had been caused by the FSTA scheme beginning prior to the commencement of military operations in Afghanistan, and a significant delay in any decision being made on including the required protection systems within the contract. However, the FSTA aircraft were quickly modified to fulfil the adequate protection, and Voyagers started operations into Afghanistan in December 2013.

The Lockheed TriStar retired from RAF service in March 2014 and the VC10 in September 2013.

== See also ==
- KC-X – US Defense department procurement program for next-generation tanker aircraft
- AirTanker Services – British airline and aircraft leasing company
- List of tanker aircraft
