= No. 1435 Flight RAF =

Royal Air Force independent aircraft flight based in the Falkland Islands

- Flight badge
- Active: 1941–1942; 1942; 1983–1985; 1988–present
- Country: United Kingdom
- Branch: Royal Air Force
- Type: Independent flight
- Role: Air defence
- Size: Four aircraft
- Part of: British Forces South Atlantic Islands
- Station: RAF Mount Pleasant
- Motto: Protect the Right
- Aircraft: Eurofighter Typhoon FGR4

Insignia
- Flight tail and nose badges
- Flight aircraft codes: F, H, C and D

No. 1435 Flight RAF, commonly abbreviated 1435 Flt, is an independent aircraft flight of the Royal Air Force (RAF). Currently operating the Eurofighter Typhoon FGR4, it is based at RAF Mount Pleasant in the Falkland Islands. Its role is to provide air defence for the Falkland Islands, South Georgia and the South Sandwich Islands. Four aircraft are permanently based in the islands, whilst their pilots and groundcrew are cycled through No. 1435 Flight from the various Typhoon squadrons in the United Kingdom, providing a 24-hour, 365-day quick reaction alert (QRA) role.

During the Second World War, No. 1435 Flight was a night fighter (NF) unit based at Malta, subsequently raised to squadron status, becoming the only RAF flying squadron to be given a four-digit number.

== History ==
=== Early years ===
The Malta Night Fighter Unit (MNFU) was formed in late July 1941 at RAF Ta Kali on Malta, equipped with twelve Hawker Hurricane Mk.II fighters. The unit's Hurricanes usually operated in pairs in conjunction with searchlights. It claimed its first successes on the night of 5/6 August, when two Fiat BR 20Ms were shot down.

No. 1435 (Night Fighter) Flight was first formed at Malta as a night fighter (NF) unit on 4 December 1941, (Note: 2 December according to Shores, Cull and Mazilia.) by re-designating the Malta Night Fighter Unit. The unit remained equipped with Hawker Hurricane Mk.II fighters, but now found that the Hurricane had difficulty in intercepting fast Junkers Ju 88s over Malta, and instead began to operate night intruder missions over Sicily to catch the enemy aircraft over their own airfields, fitting its Hurricanes with external fuel tanks to increase the aircraft's endurance. They were also used to drop supplies (and in particular money) to a British agent operating in Sicily. On 7 March, the Flight was strengthened by the addition of four radar-equipped Bristol Beaufighter night fighters.

The flight was reformed in July 1942 at RAF Luqa, also in Malta, as a day fighter unit equipped with Supermarine Spitfire, and manned by personnel from several squadrons, including No. 185, No. 249, and No. 603 Squadrons. After a brief period as No. 1435 (Fighter) Flight, at RAF Luqa, due to its size it was raised to No. 1435 Squadron on 2 August 1942 at RAF Luqa, Malta.

It converted to fighter-bomber activities in January 1943, and operated over Sicily and in Italy. It was assigned to the Balkan Air Force, carrying out operations over Albania and Yugoslavia until the end of the war.

It disbanded on 29 April 1945 at Falconara, Italy.

=== Falkland Islands ===
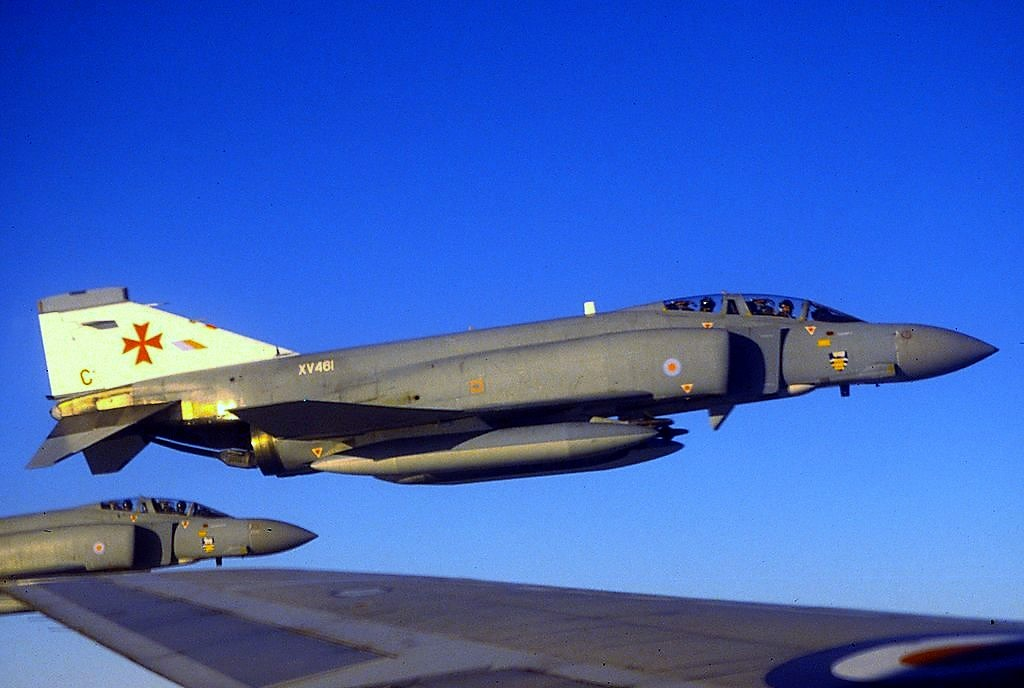
A McDonnell Douglas F-4M Phantom FGR.2 of No. 1435 Flight during 1991

Following the Falklands War in 1982, the Flight provided an air defence unit at RAF Stanley airfield in East Falkland. As this was badly damaged during the fighting, the Flight reformed with Hawker Siddeley Harrier GR.3 'jump-jet' aircraft in late 1983, and disbanding again in May 1985.

In November 1988, when No. 23(F) Squadron converted to the Panavia Tornado F3, No. 1435 Flight was revived, equipped with four McDonnell Douglas F-4M Phantom FGR.2s. After No. 23(F) Squadron's disbandment at RAF Mount Pleasant, the mission and equipment were transferred to No. 1435 Flight. The Phantoms were replaced in July 1992 when four Panavia Tornado F3s arrived in the Falklands.

No. 1435 Flight again re-equipped with the Eurofighter Typhoon in September 2009, when four Typhoon FGR4 aircraft arrived from RAF Coningsby.

== Flight home stations ==
- RAF Ta Kali
- RAF Luqa (1942)
- RAF Stanley (1983 – 1985)
- RAF Mount Pleasant (1988 – present)

== Aircraft operated ==
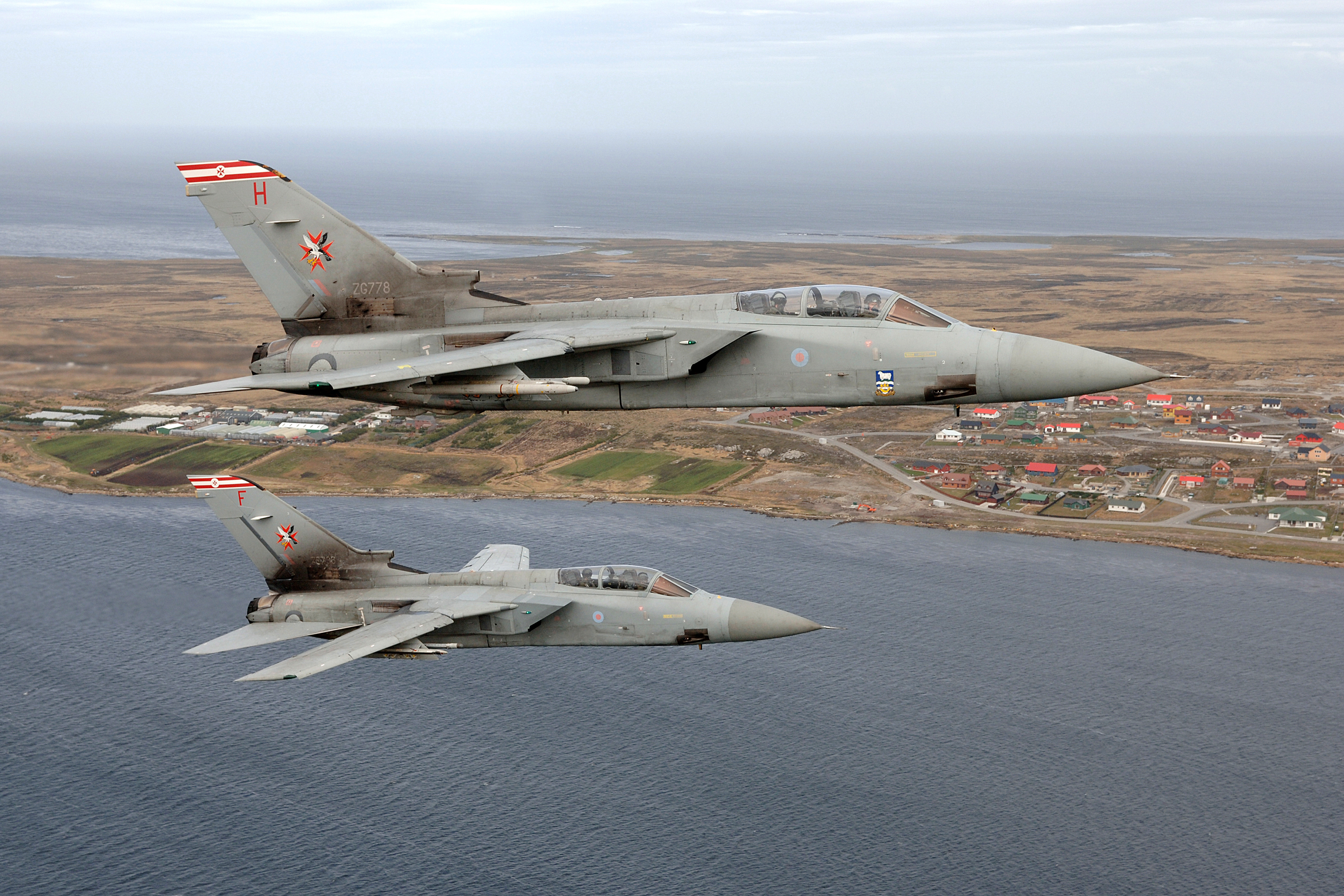
Two Panavia Tornado F3 of No. 1435 Flight flying over the Falkland Islands during 2007

Aircraft operated by No. 1435 Flight.

- Hawker Hurricane IIb and IIc (December 1941 – June 1942)
- Bristol Beaufighter I (August 1942 – April 1945)
- Supermarine Spitfire Mk.V (late 1942 – April 1945)
- Hawker Siddeley Harrier GR.3 (1983 – 1985)
- McDonnell Douglas F-4M Phantom FGR.2 (November 1988 – July 1992)
- Panavia Tornado F3 (July 1992 – September 2009)
- Eurofighter Typhoon FGR4 (September 2009 – present)

== Heritage and traditions ==
=== Motto ===
The flight goes by the motto of 'Protect the Right', while the motto of the Falkland Islands is 'Desire the Right'. (Note: The WWII squadron had neither motto nor badge at that time.)

=== Maltese heritage ===
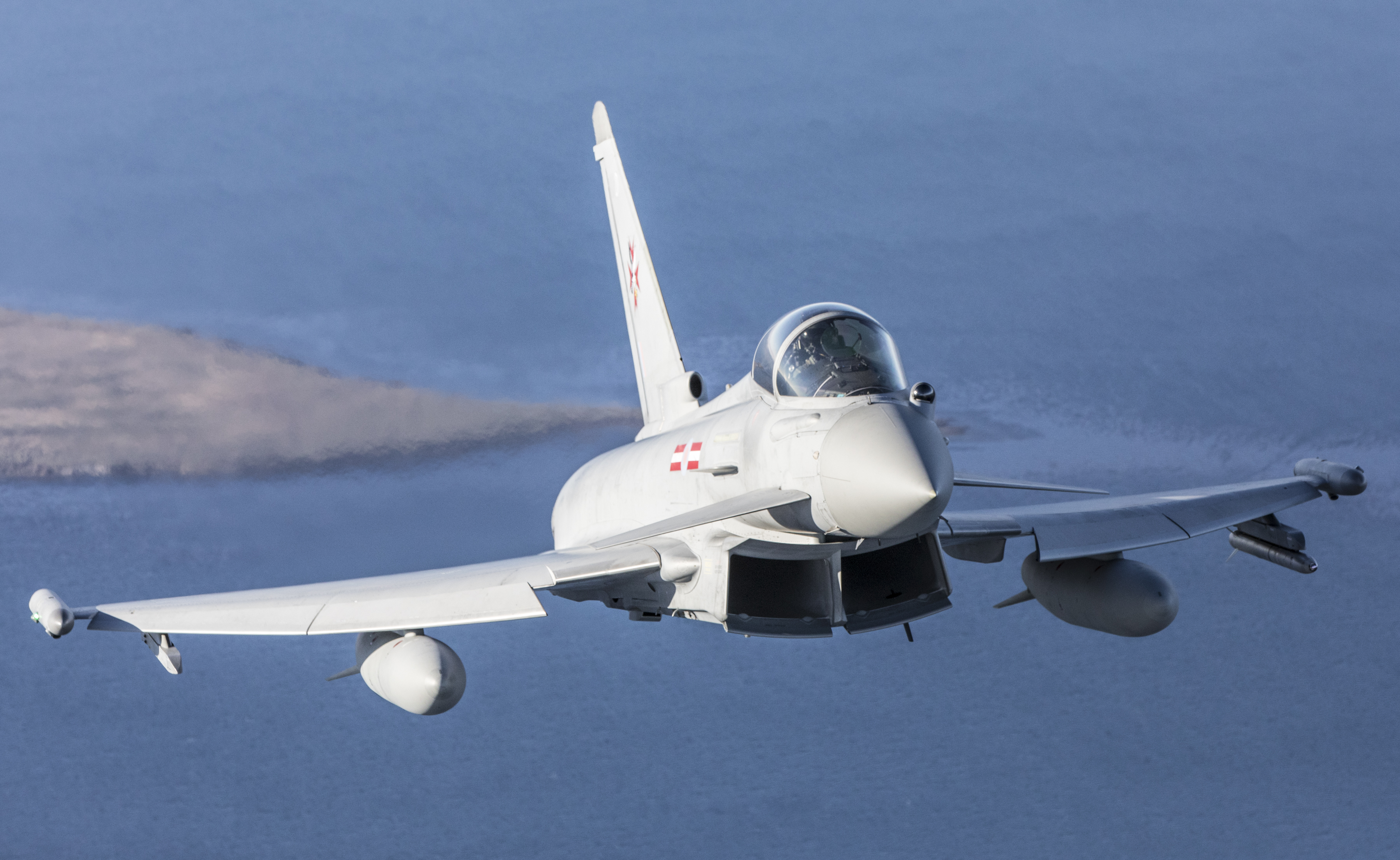
A Eurofighter Typhoon FGR4 of No. 1435 Flight

The flight has maintained its Maltese connections, with its aircraft sporting the Maltese cross. The practice of naming the four-aircraft presence on the islands has also been maintained: 'Faith', 'Hope', and 'Charity', after the three Gloster Sea Gladiators that once defended Malta, and 'Desperation'. 'Desperation' was added to the three traditional names when Phantoms entered service in the Falklands and the flight was revived in 1988. 'Faith', 'Hope', and 'Charity' fly operationally, with 'Desperation' appropriately in reserve. On their retirement in 1992, one of the F-4M Phantoms was placed as the gate guardian at Mount Pleasant. The Phantoms were replaced by four Panavia Tornado F3, which remained in service until they were replaced by four Eurofighter Typhoon FGR4 in September 2009. Although the unit's new aircraft do not have the traditional names applied, they have tail codes that match (F, H, C, D).

== See also ==
- No. 1312 Flight RAF — Falkland Islands transport and tanker aircraft
- List of Royal Air Force aircraft squadrons
- List of Royal Air Force independent flights
- Military of the Falkland Islands
