= No. 1312 Flight RAF =

Unit of the Royal Air Force in the Falkland Islands

No. 1312 Flight Royal Air Force
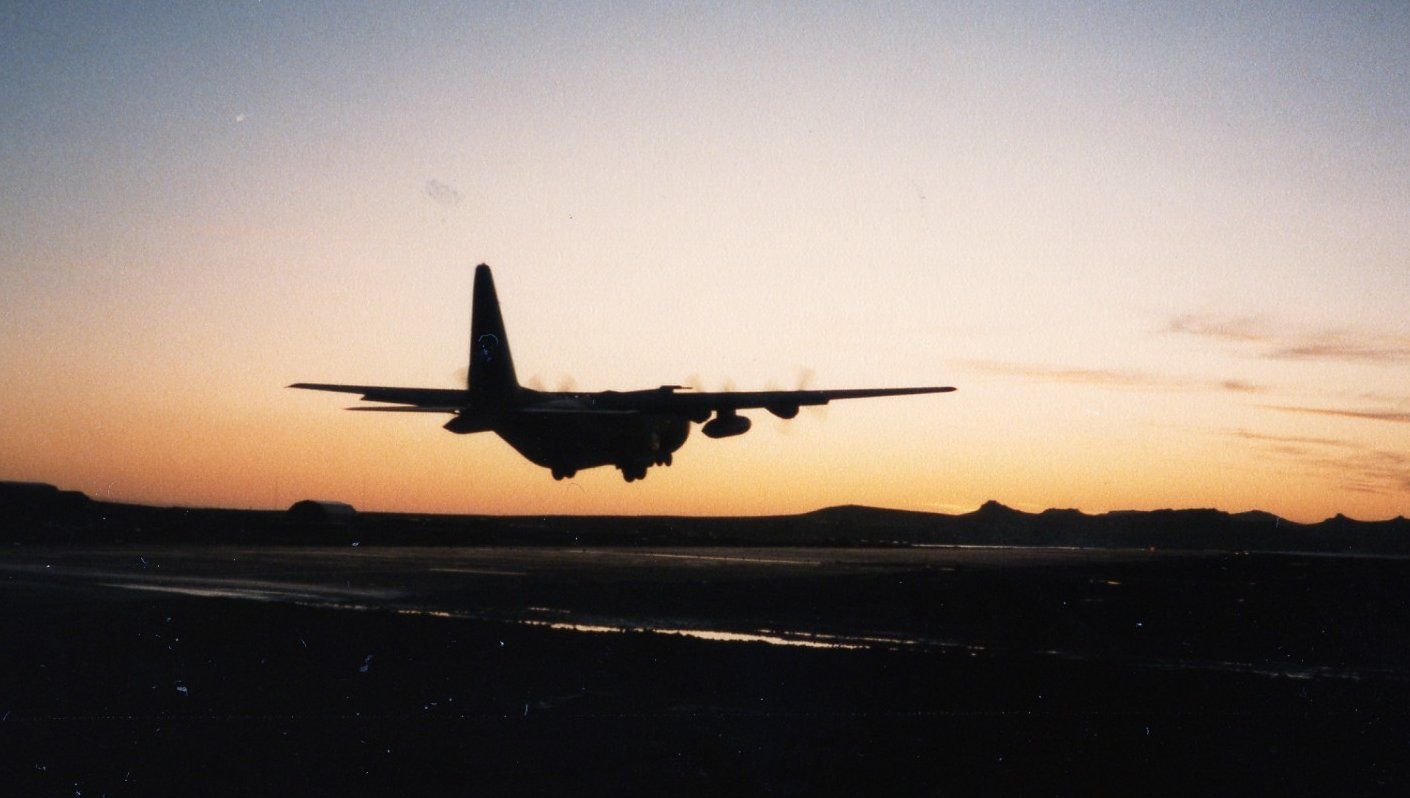
- 1312 Flt C-130K Hercules taking-off from RAF Stanley
- Active: 19 Apr 1944 – 21 Jul 1944; 14 Sep 1954 – 01 Apr 1957; 20 Aug 1983 – present
- Country: United Kingdom
- Branch: Royal Air Force
- Type: independent aircraft flight
- Role: Transport (1944; 1954–1957); Aerial refuelling and transport (1983–present)
- Size: two fixed-wing aircraft
- Part of: British Forces South Atlantic Islands
- Based at: RAF Mount Pleasant, Falkland Islands
- Motto: 'Uphold the Right'
- Website: 1312 Flight

Aircraft flown
- Transport: Airbus A400M Atlas C1
- Tanker: Airbus Voyager KC3

No. 1312 Flight Royal Air Force, commonly abbreviated to 1312 Flt RAF, is an independent aircraft flight of the Royal Air Force (RAF). Currently based at Royal Air Force Station Mount Pleasant (more commonly known as RAF Mount Pleasant, and also known as Mount Pleasant Airport, MPA, and Mount Pleasant Complex) in East Falkland, 1312 Flt are supporting at present the defence of the Falkland Islands and other nearby British Overseas Territories.

The Royal Air Force contribution to British Forces South Atlantic Islands (BFSAI) is based at Mount Pleasant; the primary frontline component is No. 1435 Flight, with its four Eurofighter Typhoon FGR4 advanced multi-role combat aircraft. 1312 Flight provides aerial refuelling, air transport, search and rescue, and maritime patrol. The latter is an important mission to the Falkland Islands government, as its Airbus A400M Atlas C1 (and its precessor Lockheed C-130K Hercules) verifies that all fishing vessels are licensed; at £1,000 per licence per season - an important source of income. The flight motto is 'Uphold the Right'; the motto of the Falkland Islands is 'Desire the Right'.

== No. 1312 Flight history ==
No 1312 (Transport) Flight was first formed on 19 April 1944 (81 years ago), at RAF Llandow, south Wales. It originally operated six Avro Ansons to collect and deliver aircrew involved in the ferrying replacement aircraft to operational squadrons. After June 1944, it was involved in transporting wounded serviceman back to England from France, until it was disbanded on 21 July 1944 (81 years ago).

1312 was re-formed on 14 September 1954 (71 years ago), at RAF Abingdon, as No 1312 (Transport Support) Flight; operating the Handley Page Hastings, and later the Vickers Valetta, disbanding on 1 April 1957 (68 years ago).

No 1312 (In Flight Refuelling) Flight re-formed again on 20 August 1983 (42 years ago) at RAF Stanley, before moving to the newly opened RAF Mount Pleasant in 1986, where it remains current. The original task was to operate the Lockheed C-130K Hercules C1K on air-to-air refuelling missions, but this was later replaced by a Vickers VC10 K4 (borrowed from 101 Squadron) and C-130K Hercules C1s from the Lyneham Wing. On 31 August 2013, the VC10 was replaced by a Lockheed TriStar K1 from 216 Squadron.

Presently, 1312 Flt utilise aircraft and crew from RAF Brize Norton. Specifically, No. 70 Squadron provide an Airbus A400M Atlas C1, whilst No. 10 and 101 Squadron provide an Airbus Voyager KC3.

== Unit badge ==
Whilst it is common for RAF stations and RAF flying squadrons to be authorised to display an official heraldic badge following Royal approval, historically, it was extremely rare for RAF Flights to be granted authority for such. However, in recent times, the Royal Air Force has been more accommodating in granting Flights with their own unit badge such as the Battle of Britain Memorial Flight.

The quest for an official heraldic badge for 1312 Flight began sometime 2000. No 1435 Flight's badge contained a Cassin's Falcon (a Peregrine falcon, common in the Falklands), so in keeping with the larger transport aircraft operated by 1312, a larger bird, the Upland Goose was chosen. 'Uphold the Right' was selected as the official motto, in keeping with other MPA units, and the Falkland Island's own motto, 'Desire the Right'. The badge was eventually awarded August 2002, and received its Royal approval in 2003.

== Aircraft operated ==
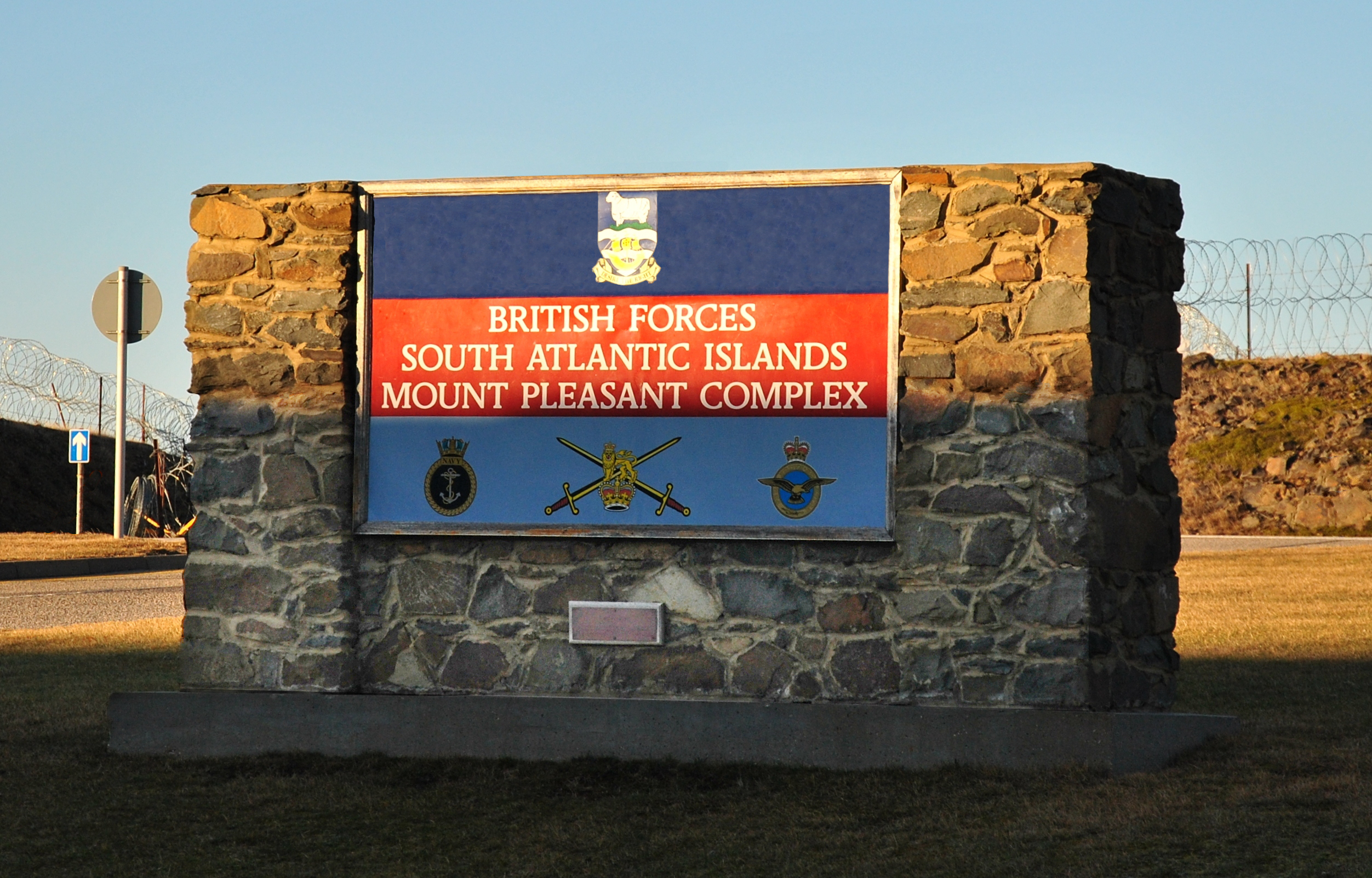
Mount Pleasant Complex, current home to No 1312 Flight RAF.

aircraft operated by No. 1312 Flight RAF
from	to	aircraft	version
19 Apr 1944	21 Jul 1944	Avro Anson	MkI; MkX
14 Sep 1954	1 Apr 1957	Handley Page Hastings	C.1; C.2
Feb 1955	1 Apr 1957	Vickers Valetta	C.1
20 Aug 1983	31 Mar 1996	Lockheed C-130K Hercules	C1K
31 Mar 1996	31 Aug 2013	Vickers VC10; Lockheed C-130K Hercules	K4; C1
31 Aug 2013	Feb 2014	Lockheed TriStar; Lockheed C-130K Hercules	K1; C1
Feb 2014	Mar 2018; 5 Apr 2018	Airbus Voyager; Lockheed C-130J Hercules	KC3; C4/C5
Mar 2018	present	Airbus Voyager; Airbus A400M Atlas	KC3; C1

== Flight bases ==
bases and airfields used by No. 1312 Flight RAF
name	from	to	station	location
No 1312 (Transport) Flight	19 April 1944	21 July 1944	RAF Llandow	Glamorgan, Wales
No 1312 (Transport Support) Flight	14 September 1954	1 April 1957	RAF Abingdon	Oxfordshire, England
No 1312 (In Flight Refuelling) Flight	20 August 1983	1986	RAF Stanley	Stanley, Falkland Islands
No 1312 (In Flight Refuelling) Flight	1986	present	RAF Mount Pleasant	East Falkland, Falkland Islands

== See also ==
- No. 1453 Flight RAF
- List of Royal Air Force aircraft squadrons
- List of Royal Air Force independent flights
