= Lockheed TriStar (RAF) =

Three-engined jet airliner converted into tanker/transport aircraft used by the RAF

RAF Tristar
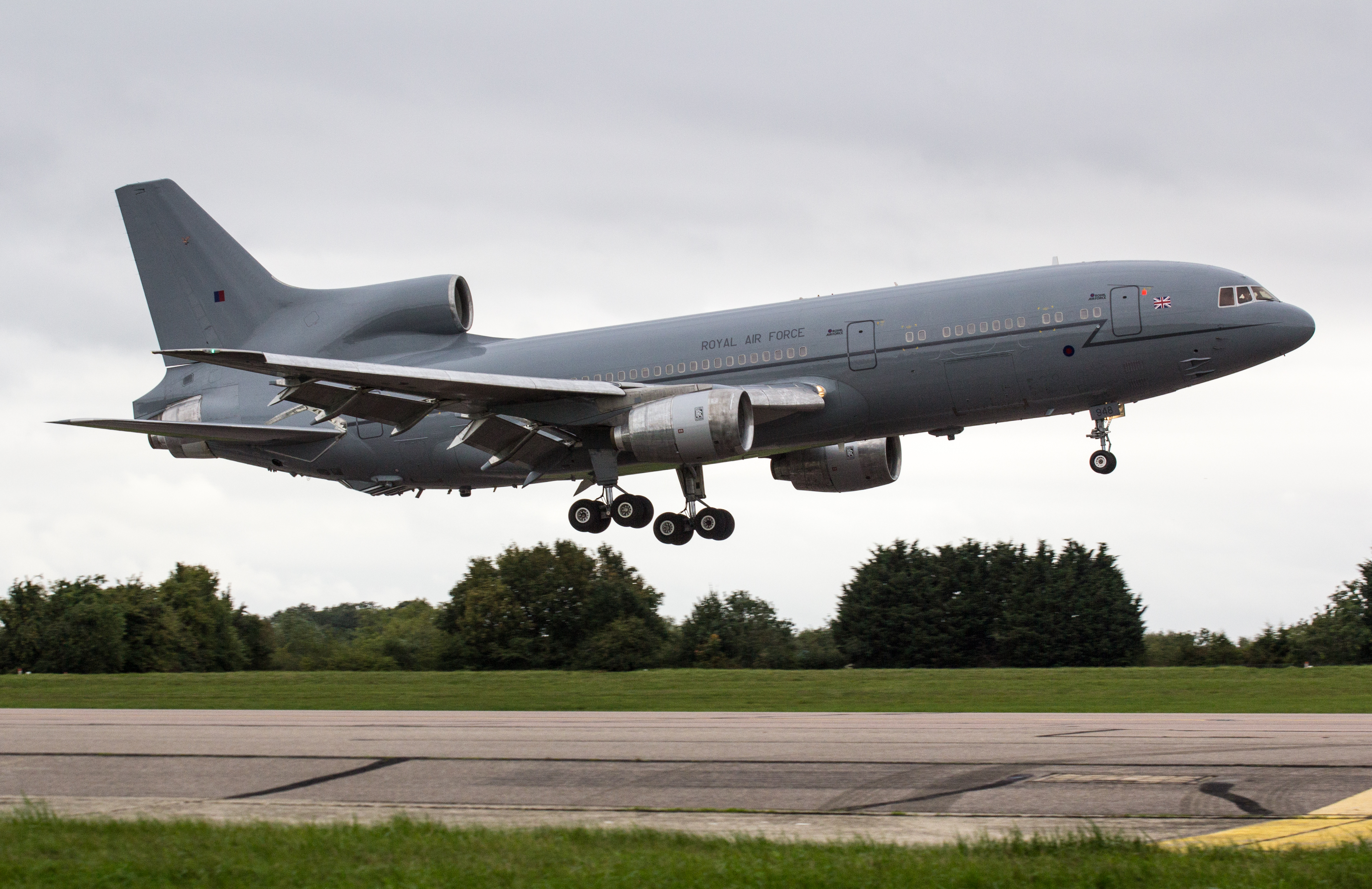
- RAF Tristar KC1 ZD948 landing at RAF Brize Norton, Oxfordshire, 2013

General information
- Type: strategic tanker / transport
- Manufacturer: Lockheed Corporation
- Status: Retired
- Primary user: Royal Air Force
- Number built: 9 conversions

History
- Manufactured: 1979–1984
- Introduction date: 24 March 1986
- First flight: 16 November 1970 (L-1011)
- Retired: 24 March 2014
- Developed from: Lockheed L-1011 TriStar

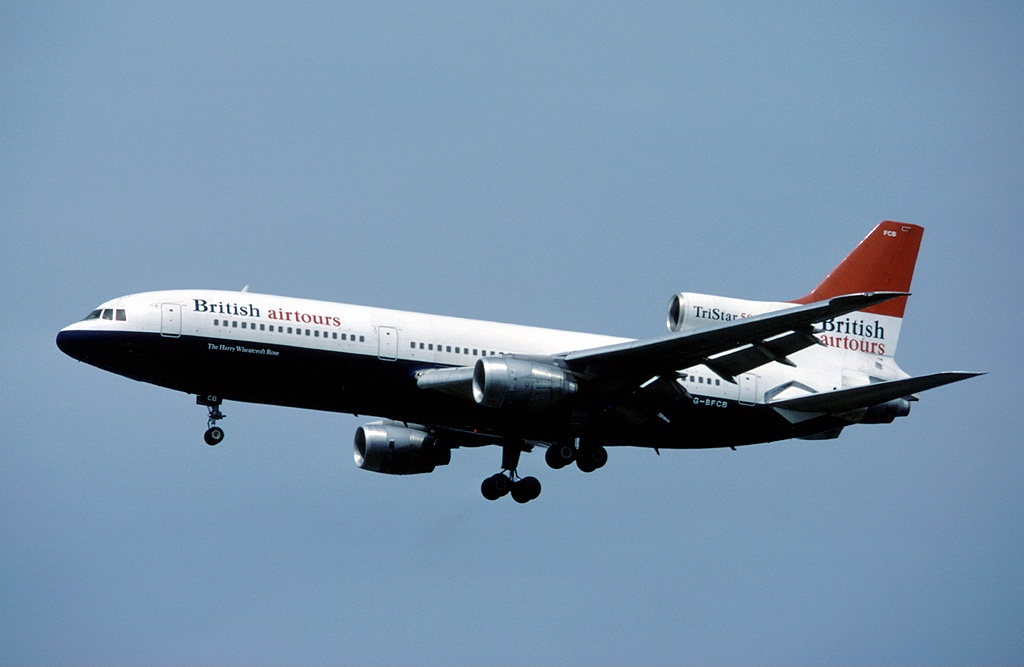
L-1011-500 TriStar G-BFCB, June 1983. This aircraft underwent conversion to Tristar K1 standard in November, becoming ZD949.

The RAF Tristar is a retired air-to-air refuelling (AAR) tanker and transport aircraft, formerly in service with the Royal Air Force (RAF). All airframes were second-hand Lockheed L-1011-500 TriStars converted from airliners previously operated by British Airways and Pan American World Airways (Pan Am); they entered service with the RAF in 1984.

The TriStars were purchased following the Falklands War, to satisfy an urgent operational requirement for four strategic tanker/transport/freighter aircraft that had been identified during the conflict. Of the nine that eventually entered service, the first six were acquired from British Airways. Four of these were converted into KC1 variants that met the full requirement, while the remaining two were converted to K1 standard without a large freight door in the forward cabin area. The three ex-Pan Am aircraft performed a passenger-only role with underfloor freight, as C2/C2A variants. Upon entering military service, the RAF dropped the upper-case 'S" when describing their Tristar aircraft.

Operated by No. 216 Squadron at RAF Brize Norton in Oxfordshire, England, the KC1 and K1 variants of RAF Tristar formed the AAR fleet of the RAF until they and they and the Cs variants were prematurely retired in 2014. They were eventually replaced by the Airbus A330 MRTT under the Future Strategic Tanker Aircraft (FSTA) programme. No. 216 Squadron was officially disbanded on 20 March 2014, and flew its last sorties with the Tristar on 24 March. Three aircraft were scrapped in 2014 shortly after retirement. The remaining six aircraft were flown to Bruntingthorpe Aerodrome for storage and resale, however all were eventually scrapped.

== Design and development ==
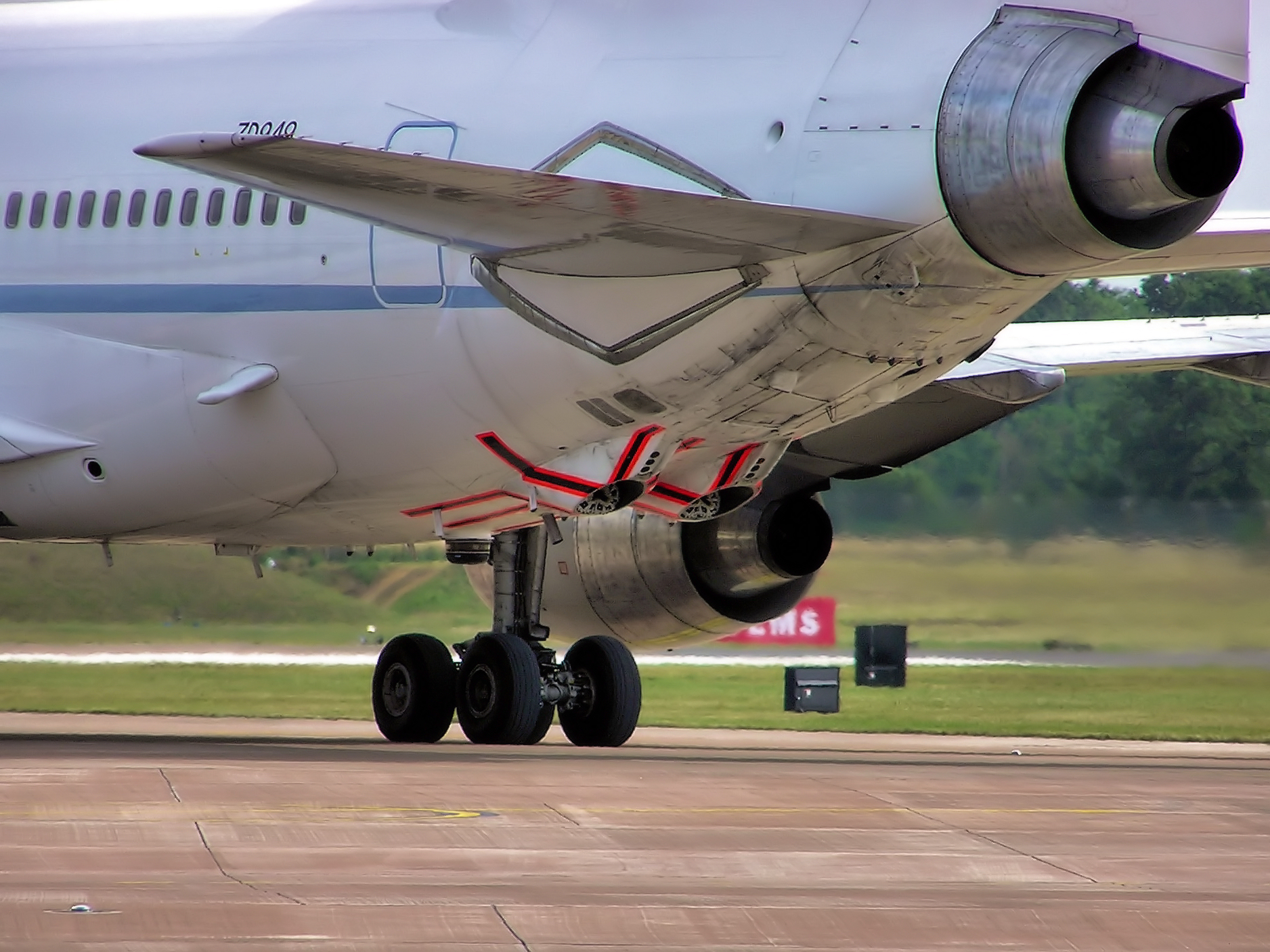
The two refuelling points under the rear fuselage were painted with red stripes for guidance to the receiver aircraft.

The Royal Air Force operated nine L-1011-500 TriStars; six ex-British Airways, and three ex-Pan Am. The TriStars were purchased in the immediate aftermath of the Falklands War in 1982 to bolster the long range capability of the RAF in the transport and tanker roles, as the demands of refuelling Hercules that were supporting forces stationed in the Falklands was rapidly using up the fatigue life of the RAF's Handley Page Victor tankers. A requirement for at least four wide-bodied tanker/transport aircraft was drawn up. At the same time, British Airways wished to dispose of its Lockheed L-1011-500 aircraft, so it put in a joint bid with Marshall Aerospace of Cambridge to supply six TriStars. The initial order for the ex-British Airways TriStars was placed on 14 December 1982; the three ex-Pan Am aircraft were purchased in 1984. All Tristar aircraft were operated by No. 216 Squadron, based at RAF Brize Norton.

Marshall Aerospace performed the conversion of the TriStars to their military roles at their facilities based at Cambridge Airport. The ex-British Airways aircraft had analogue autopilot systems, while the former Pan Am aircraft had digital autopilots, the difference resulting in the Pan Am aircraft being designated C2. The solitary C2A differed from the C2s in having some military avionics and a new interior.

The RAF's Tristars were subject to progressive updating throughout their operating life; including the fitting of flight deck armour and Directional Infrared Counter Measures to protect against ground fire when flying into Iraq. The aircraft were to be fitted with an updated cockpit, but this was abandoned due to the retirement date being brought forward.

The Tristar was expected to remain in service with the RAF until the end of the 2010s, when it was scheduled to be replaced by the Airbus A330 MRTT under the Future Strategic Tanker Aircraft (FSTA) programme. However, the date was brought forward to 2014 under the Strategic Defence and Security Review of 2010. The AirTanker consortium, led by EADS, won the FSTA contract in January 2004. During a period of doubts over the FSTA programme, Marshall Aerospace offered to buy and convert some of the large number of surplus commercial TriStars as tankers, but this was rejected.

== Operational history ==
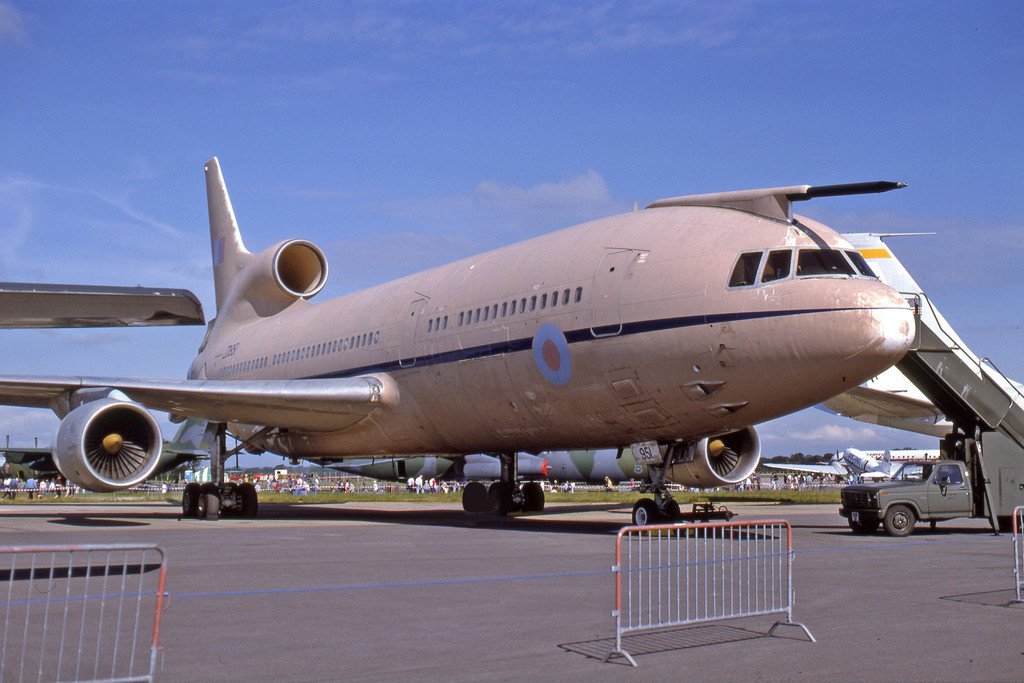
Tristar K1 ZD951 in Op GRANBY markings at the International Air Tattoo, July 1991.

The first British Airways TriStar to be purchased by the RAF was G-BFCB on 2 November 1982, however it was leased back to the airline on 29 March 1983 until November, eventually undergoing conversion in 1986. The first converted aircraft to be delivered to the Royal Air Force was Tristar KC1 ZD953 (ex-G-BFCF) on 24 March 1986, when it was handed over at Cambridge Airport by Sir Arthur Marshall. The aircraft was accepted by Air Chief Marshal Sir Joseph Gilbert, and ZD953 became No. 216 Squadron's first Tristar, the squadron having been reactivated on 1 November 1984.

The TriStar saw active service throughout many conflicts, the first being the 1991 Gulf War as part of Operation Granby. On 6 January 1991, a single Tristar K1 with two crews was deployed to King Khalid International Airport, near Riyadh in Saudi Arabia, its role as a tanker. During the deployment, two Tristar K1s (ZD949 and ZD951) were repainted in a pinkish desert camouflage, earning them the nicknames of 'Pinky' and 'Perky'. By the end of the deployment in March, the Tristar K1s had accumulated over 430 flying hours after flying over 90 AAR missions and transferring 3,100,000 kilograms (6,800,000 pounds) of fuel to receiver aircraft. The rest of the fleet were used for transport between the Persian Gulf and United Kingdom.

After the outbreak of the Bosnian War in April 1992, the United Nations passed Resolution 781 on 9 October, banning military flights over Bosnia and Herzegovina. A following resolution (816) was passed on 31 March 1993 prohibiting all non-authorised flights. On 12 April, NATO began Operation Deny Flight to enforce Resolution 816, under which two RAF Tristars were deployed to Italy to provide (AAR) for fighters carrying out the policing of that airspace. After the situation escalated in the 1999 Kosovo War, three Tristars were deployed once more to Italy under Operation Engadine in order to support NATO aircraft. Over the course of Op ENGADINE, five TriStars operated in the theatre delivering 13,500,000 pounds (6,100,000 kilograms) of fuel to 1,580 receiver aircraft across 230 missions.

Tristars joined Vickers VC10s in the air-to-air refuelling (AAR) role for Operation Veritas (Afghanistan), during which they provided aerial refuelling for United States Navy aircraft.

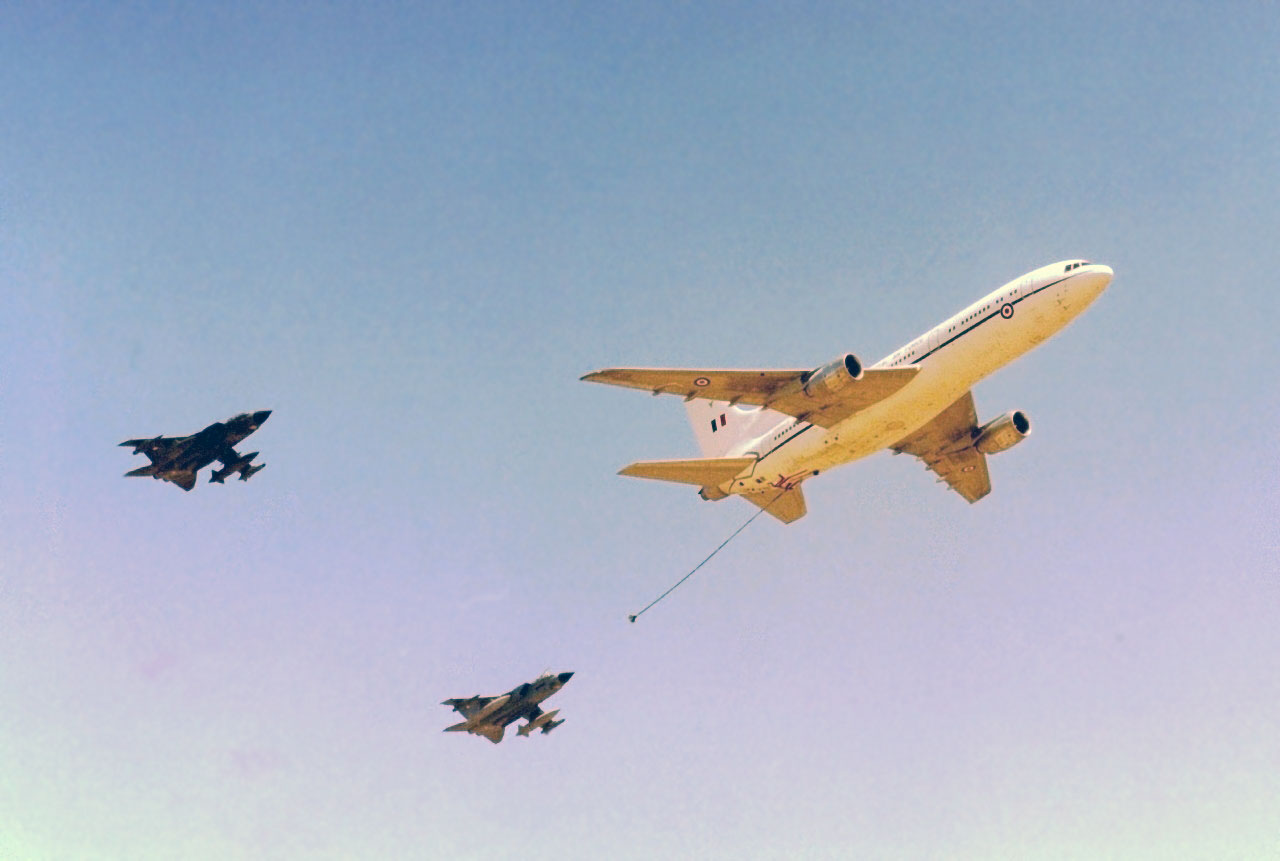
Tristar K1 refuelling an RAF Panavia Tornado in mid-air in September 2000

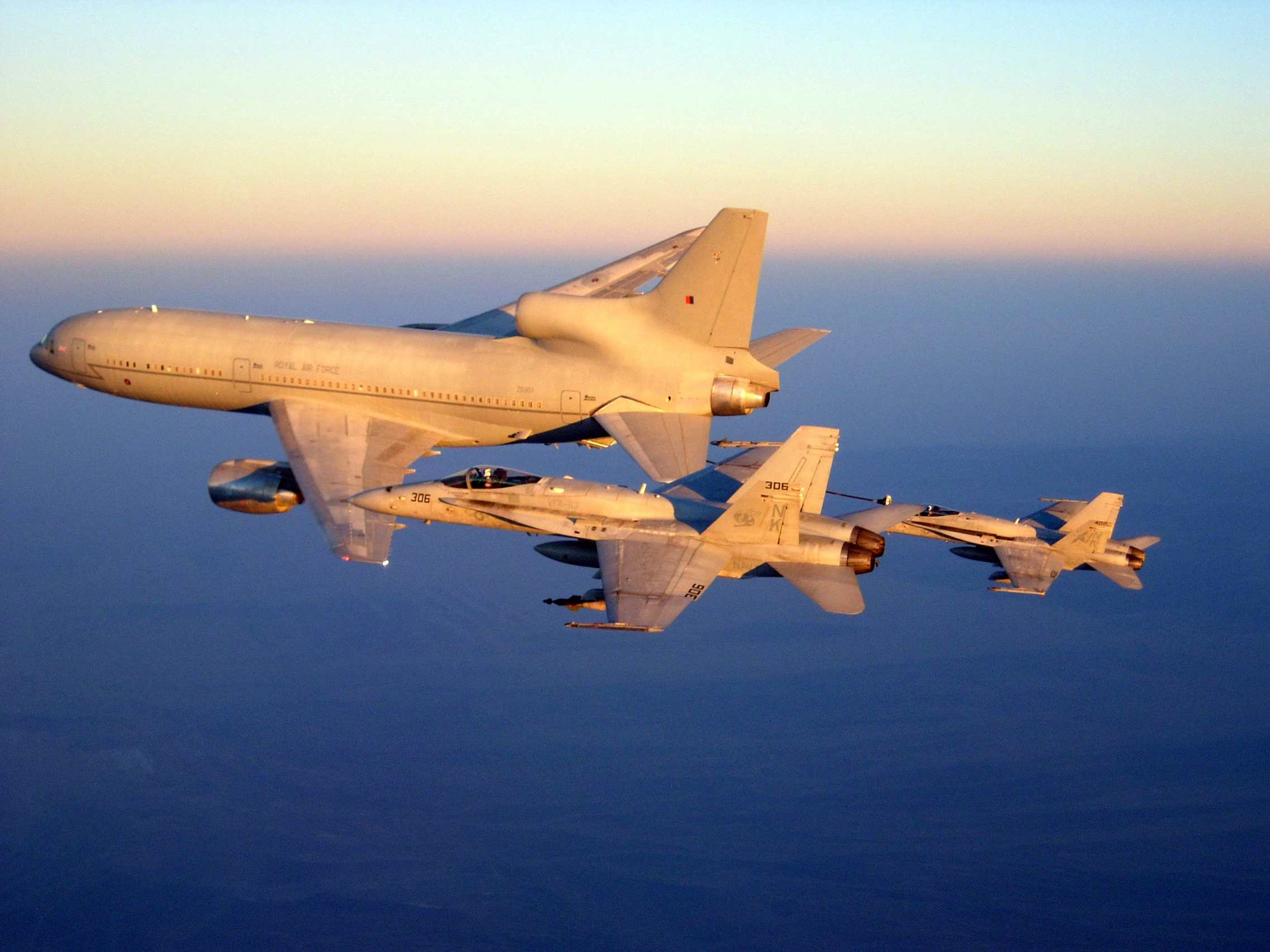
Tristar K1 ZD951 refuelling US Navy F/A-18Cs over Afghanistan, October 2008

In 2003, the RAF deployed Tristars to Bahrain as part of Operation Telic.

In October 2006, Marshall Aerospace was awarded £22 million contract to modernise the Tristar under the project name of 'Minimum Military Requirements' (MMR). In early 2007, Tristar K1 ZD949 arrived at Cambridge Airport to undergo numerous upgrades, including a glass cockpit. However, due to the Strategic Defence and Security Review of 2010, these upgrades were halted and it was left at Cambridge Airport to be used for spare parts.

Tristar AAR aircraft supported the British air strikes on Libya of 19–20 March 2011 under Operation Ellamy as part of the coalition operations to enforce UN Resolution 1973.

In August 2013, a Tristar from No. 216 Squadron was detached in order to provide AAR support as part of No. 1312 Flight at RAF Mount Pleasant due to the forthcoming retirement of the Vickers VC10 from RAF service. The Tristar was replaced in this role in February 2014 by an Airbus Voyager KC3.

No. 216 Squadron was disbanded at RAF Brize Norton on 20 March 2014. The final sortie of an RAF Tristar was carried on 24 March by ZD948 and ZD950 which refuelled four Eurofighter Typhoons and a single Panavia Tornado GR4; ZD950 returned to base, while ZD948 conducted flypasts over Cambridge and Derby before returning to RAF Brize Norton for the last time.

Following their withdrawal from service, six Tristars made their last flights to Bruntingthorpe Aerodrome in Leicestershire, while the remaining three were scrapped. ZD949 was the first to be scrapped, on 27 May 2014 at Cambridge Airport, having last flown in November 2010 after the abandonment of the MMR upgrades. This was followed by ZE706 in June which was also at Cambridge Airport as a spares airframe; ZD952 was scrapped at Cotswold Airport on 9 September 2014, having arrived there in February.

The remaining six aircraft, comprising the two C2s and the four KC1 AAR tankers, were placed in storage at Bruntingthorpe, having been purchased by GJD Systems Corp with the intention of selling them on; They were being maintained by GJD Systems to a fully airworthy condition.

In 2017, it was announced that Tempus Applied Solutions, an aerospace company based in the United States, would purchase the six aircraft for further use. The company's intention was to place three of the AAR tankers to service in that role, providing additional probe and drogue aerial refuelling capacity to the United States Navy and NATO nations that utilise that particular method. The remaining three airframes would be utilised as sources of spares. In August 2020, it was reported the deal had fallen through. The six aircraft were eventually scrapped.

== Variants ==
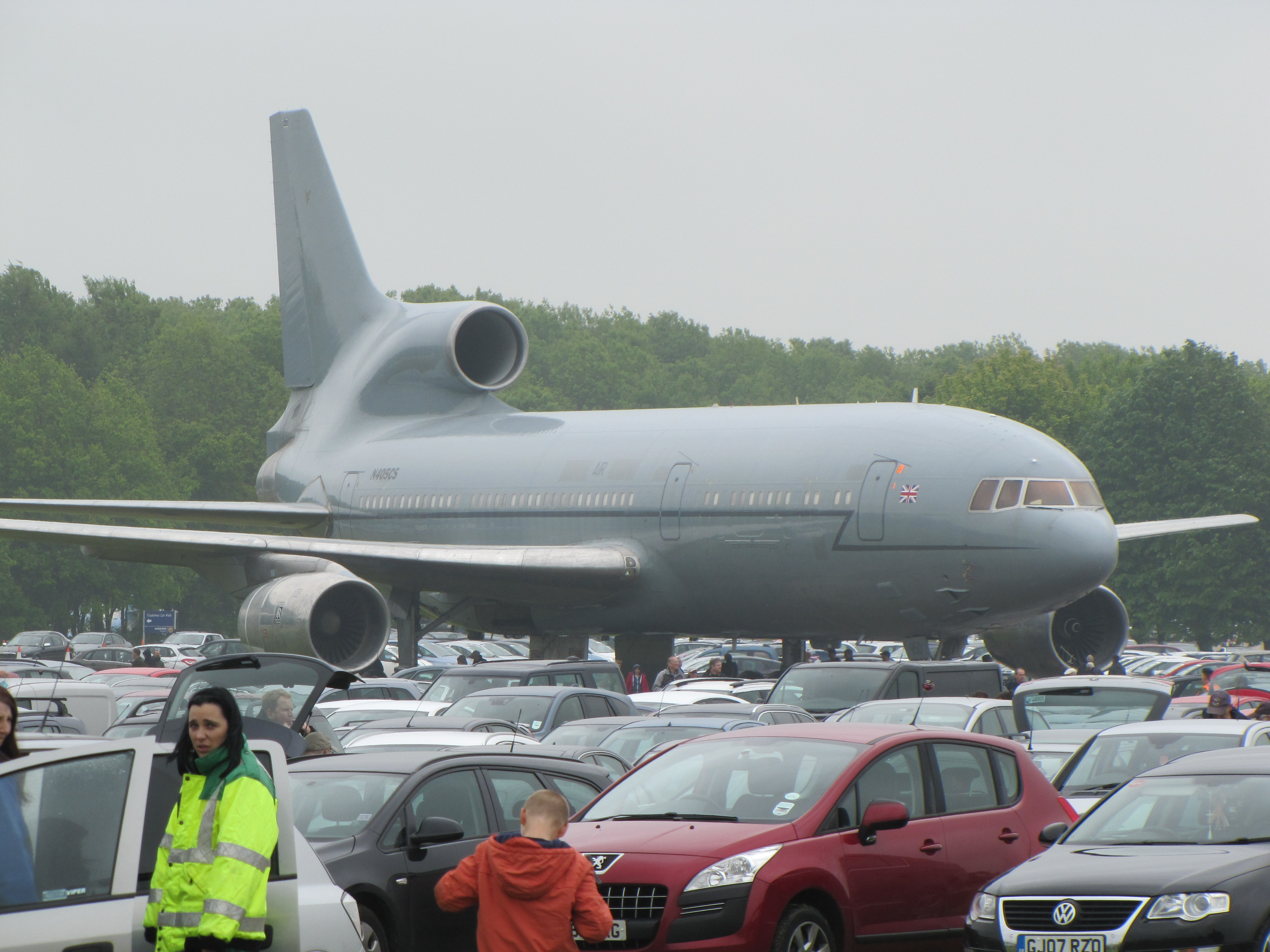
TriStar N405CS (ex-ZD950) at Bruntingthorpe Aerodrome in 2015, following the sale to AGD Systems Corp.

Tristar K1
Conversion of former British Airways TriStar 500s for tanker/transport/cargo role (not fitted with a cargo door), two aircraft. Additional fuel tanks of 96,800-pound (43,900 kg) capacity fitted in forward and aft baggage holds, total fuel capacity 308,000 lb (139,700 kg). Main cabin modified for aeromedical use and to seat up to 187 passengers in the rear, with baggage stored forward. Two Flight Refuelling Mk.17T Hose Drum Units in underside aft rear fuselage, with location precluding both from being used at the same time.
Tristar KC1
Conversion of former British Airways TriStar 500s for tanker/cargo/passenger transport role, four aircraft. Same refuelling modifications as K1; also fitted with a large cargo door in the forward fuselage and main cabin modified to handle palletised freight or be quickly configured for aeromedical use and in mixed passenger/freight mode.
Tristar C1
Former British Airways TriStar 500s operated as passenger aircraft before tanker conversion
Tristar C2
Former Pan American World Airways TriStar 500s operated as passenger aircraft with up to 266 passengers; with capability for aeromedical use and carrying under-floor cargo in original compartments, two aircraft.
Tristar C2A
One former Pan Am TriStar 500 operated as passenger aircraft, different avionics to the two C2s

== Operators ==
United Kingdom

- Royal Air Force
  - RAF Brize Norton, Oxfordshire, England
    - No. 216 Squadron (1984–2014)
  - RAF Mount Pleasant, East Falkland, Falkland Islands
    - No. 1312 Flight (2013–2014)

== Specifications (Tristar K1) ==
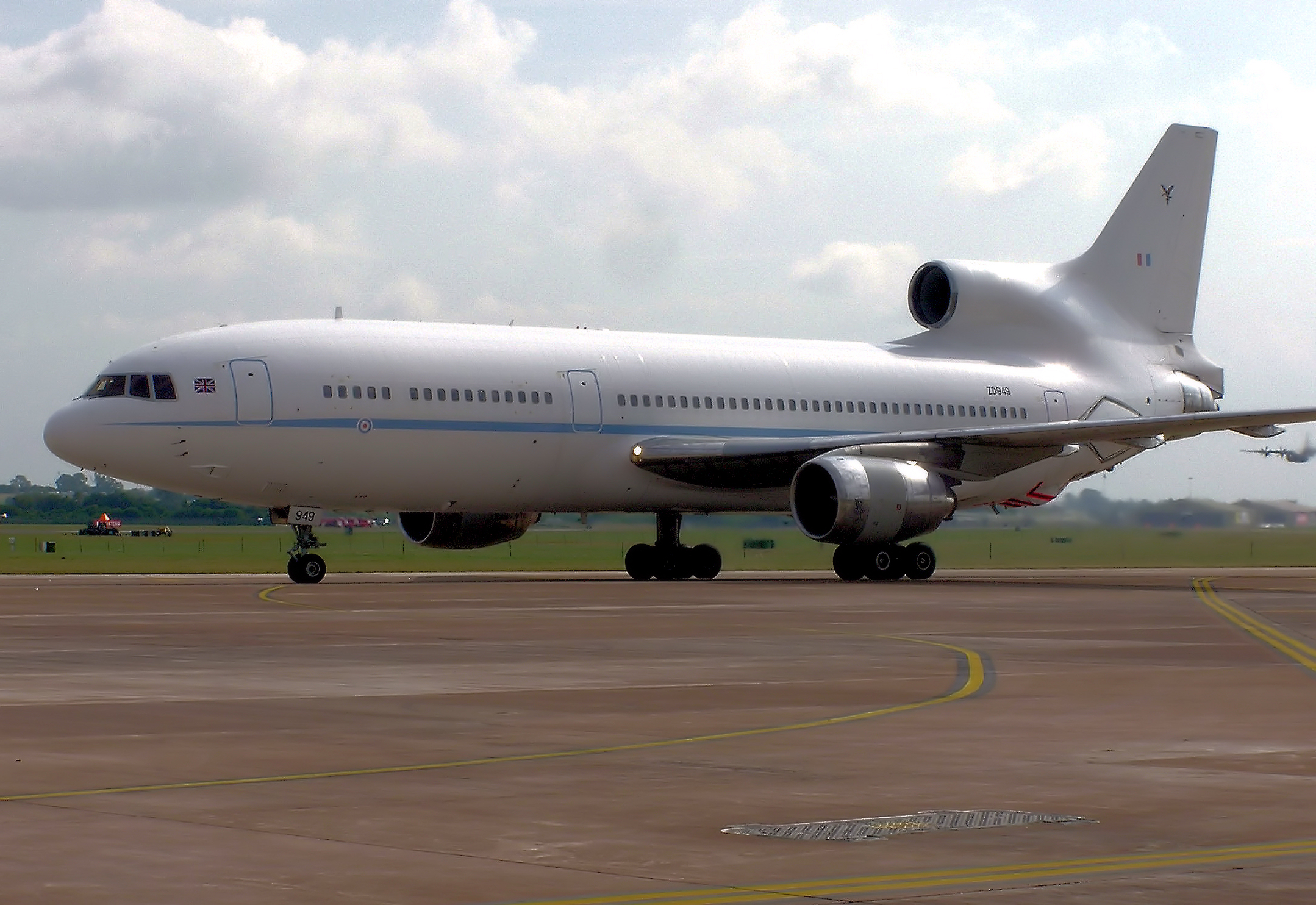
Tristar K1 ZD949 at the Royal International Air Tattoo, Fairford, July 2005.

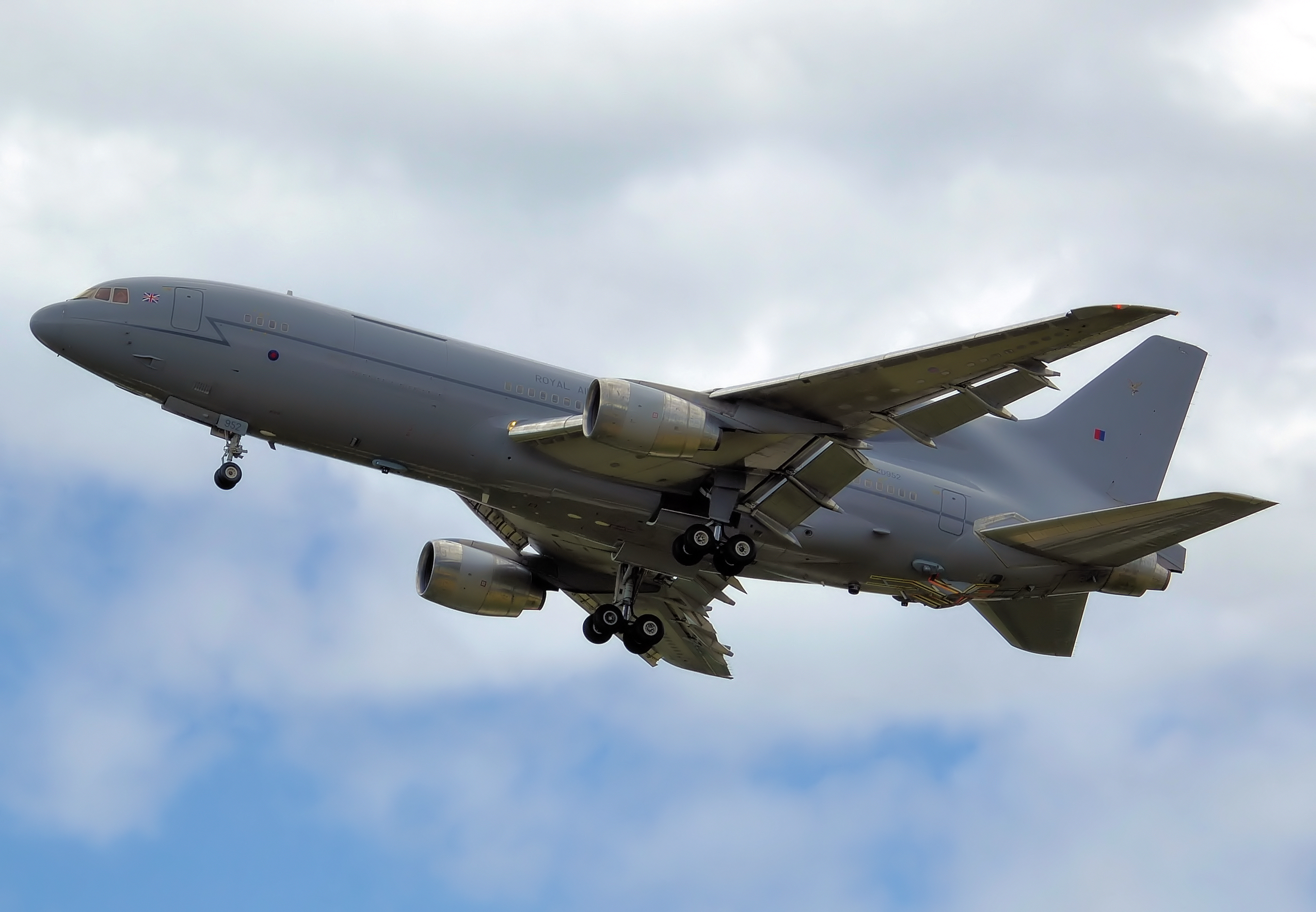
Tristar KC1 ZD952 at Kemble Air Day, June 2008.

Data from The International Directory of Military Aircraft, RAF TriStar page Airliners.net

General characteristics

- Crew: 4 (1 captain, 1 co-pilot, 1 air engineer, 1 Air Loadmaster)
- Capacity: 187 passengers (250 on C variant)
- Length: 164 ft 3 in (50.06 m)
- Wingspan: 164 ft 4 in (50.09 m)
- Height: 55 ft 4 in (16.87 m)
- Wing area: 3,540 sq ft (329 m^{2})
- Empty weight: 242,684 lb (110,080 kg)
- Max takeoff weight: 540,000 lb (244,940 kg)
- Fuel capacity: 300,000 lb (136,078 kg) maximum fuel load
- Powerplant: 3 × Rolls-Royce RB.211-524B high-bypass turbofan engine, 50,000 lbf (220 kN) thrust each

Performance

- Maximum speed: Mach 0.9
- Cruise speed: 483 kn (556 mph, 895 km/h) / M0.83
- Range: 4,200 nmi (4,800 mi, 7,800 km) with maximum passenger payload
- Service ceiling: 43,000 ft (13,000 m)
- Rate of climb: 2,820 ft/min (14.3 m/s)

== See also ==
- Future Strategic Tanker Aircraft

Related development

- Lockheed L-1011 TriStar

Aircraft of comparable role, configuration, and era

- Boeing KC-33
- McDonnell Douglas KC-10 Extender
- Ilyushin Il-78

Related lists

- List of tanker aircraft
- List of Lockheed aircraft
