= List of British military bases =

Military bases operated by the British Armed Forces

This is a list of military bases owned or used by the British Armed Forces both in the United Kingdom and around the world. This list details only current facilities.

== HMRN - His Majesty's royal Navy ==
=== Royal Navy ===
==== Domestic naval bases ====
- His Majesty's Naval Base, Devonport
- His Majesty's Naval Base, Portsmouth
- His Majesty's Naval Base, Clyde
- Marchwood Military Port
- HMS Drake
- HMS Nelson
- HMS Neptune
- Royal Naval Air Station, Culdrose
- Royal Naval Air Station, Predannack
- Royal Naval Air Station, Yeovilton
- Royal Naval Air Station, Merryfield
- HMS Gannet
- Britannia Royal Naval College, Dartmouth
- HMS Collingwood
- HMS Excellent
- HMS Raleigh
- HMS Sultan
- HMS Temeraire
- Defence Diving School
- HMS Caledonia
- Institute of Naval Medicine
- Northwood Headquarters
- Royal Naval Armaments Depot, Coulport
- Defence Munitions, Beith
- Defence Munitions, Crombie
- Defence Munitions, Gosport
- Vulcan Naval Reactor Test Establishment
- British Underwater Test and Evaluation Centre

==== Overseas naval bases ====
Bahrain naval bases:

- United Kingdom Naval Support Facility

British Indian Ocean Territory naval bases:

- Naval Support Facility Diego Garcia

Falkland Islands naval bases:

- East Cove Military Port

Gibraltar naval bases:

- His Majesty's Naval Base, Gibraltar
- Windmill Hill Signal Station

Oman naval bases:

- UK Joint Logistics Support Base

Singapore naval bases:

- British Defence Singapore Support Unit
- Senoko Oil Fuel Depot

United States naval bases:

- HMS Saker

=== Royal Marines ===
==== Domestic marine establishments ====
- Commando Training Centre Royal Marines
- Royal Marine Barracks, Stonehouse
- Royal Marine Barracks, Poole
- Royal Marine Barracks, Condor
- Royal Marine Barracks, Tamar
- Royal Marine Barracks, Norton Manor
- Royal Marine Barracks, Bickleigh
- Royal Marine Barracks, Chivenor
- Royal Marine Barracks, Instow

==== Overseas marine establishments ====
Norway marine establishments:

- Camp Viking
- Bardufoss Air Station

== British Army ==
=== Domestic army bases ===
==== Aldershot Garrison ====
- Duchess of Kent Barracks
- Fox Lines
- Gale Barracks
- Keogh Barracks
- Lille Barracks
- Mons Barracks
- Montgomery House
- New Normandy Barracks
- St Omer Barracks
- Taurus House
- Travers Barracks

==== Tidworth, Netheravon & Bulford Garrison ====
- Aliwal Barracks
- Assaye Barracks
- Bhurtpore Barracks
- Campion Lines
- Candahar Barracks
- Delhi Barracks
- Jellalabad Barracks
- Kiwi Barracks
- Lucknow Barracks
- Mooltan Barracks
- Airfield Camp, Netheravon
- Picton Barracks
- Powle Lines
- Prince Philip Lines
- Swinton Barracks
- Ward Barracks
- Wing Barracks

==== Catterick Garrison ====
- Alma Lines
- Bourlon Barracks
- Cambrai Barracks
- Gaza Barracks
- Helles Barracks
- Marne Barracks
- Megiddo Lines
- Piave Lines
- Somme Barracks
- Vimy Barracks

==== Colchester Garrison ====
- Berechurch Hall Camp
- Goojerat Barracks
- Merville Barracks

==== Edinburgh Garrison ====
- Edinburgh Castle
- Dreghorn Barracks
- Glencorse Barracks
- Redford Barracks

==== Larkhill Garrison ====
- Horne Barracks
- Purvis Lines
- Roberts Barracks
- Royal Artillery Barracks, Larkhill

==== London Garrison ====
- Tower of London
- Hyde Park Barracks
- Horse Guards
- Regent's Park Barracks
- Royal Artillery Barracks, Woolwich
- Napier Lines
- Wellington Barracks

==== Pirbright Garrison ====
- Alexander Barracks
- Brunswick Lines
- Elizabeth Barracks

==== Warminster Garrison ====
- Battlesbury Barracks
- Harman Lines
- Waterloo Lines

==== Bovington Garrison ====
- Allenby Barracks
- Lulworth Camp

==== Winchester Garrison ====
- Peninsula Barracks
- Sir John Moore Barracks
- Worthy Down Camp

==== Blandford Garrison ====
- Blandford Camp

==== York Garrison ====
- Imphal Barracks
- Queen Elizabeth Barracks

==== Hereford Garrison ====
- Pontrilas Camp
- Stirling Lines

=== Overseas army bases ===
==== Belize army bases ====
- Price Barracks
- Baldy Beacon and Guacamollo Bridge Training Areas
- Mountain Pine Ridge Training Area

==== Brunei army bases ====
- Medicina Lines
- Sittang Camp
- Tuker Lines

==== Canada army bases ====
- CFB Suffield

==== Cyprus army bases ====
- Blue Beret Camp

==== Estonia army bases ====
- Tapa Army Base

==== Falkland Islands army bases ====
- Mount Pleasant Complex
- Falkland Islands Defence Force Headquarters

==== Germany army bases ====
- Normandy Barracks
- Althone Barracks
- Ayrshire Barracks
- Wulfen Defence Munitions Storage Facility

==== Gibraltar army bases ====
- Devil's Tower Camp
- Tunnels of Gibraltar

==== Iraq army bases ====
- Besmaya Range Complex
- Camp Zorbash
- Al Asad Airbase
- Camp Taji

==== Kenya army bases ====
- Archer's Post Training Area
- Dol Dol Training Area
- Nyati Barracks
- Kahawa Barracks
- Kifaru Barracks
- International Mine Action Training Centre
- Peace Training Support Centre

==== Kosovo army bases ====
- Camp Bondsteel

==== Nepal army bases ====
- HQ Jawalakhel, Patan
- Pokhara Camp
- Dharan Station

==== Oman army bases ====
- UK Joint Logistics Support Base
- Omani-British Joint Training Area

==== Sovereign Base Areas of Akrotiri and Dhekelia army bases ====
- Alexander Barracks
- Ayios Nikolaos Station
- Dhekelia Cantonment
- Episkopi Cantonment
- Nightingale Barracks

== Royal Air Force ==
=== Domestic air force stations ===
- RAF Barkston Heath
- RAF Barnham
- RAF Benson
- RAF Boulmer
- RAF Brize Norton
- RAF Coningsby
- RAF Cosford
- RAF Cranwell
- Royal Air Force College
- RAF Digby
- RAF Fylingdales
- RAF Halton
- RAF Henlow
- RAF High Wycombe
- RAF Honington
- RAF Leeming
- RAF Lossiemouth
- RAF Marham
- RAF Mona
- RAF Northolt
- RAF Odiham
- RAF Shawbury
- RAF Spadeadam
- RAF St Mawgan
- RAF Syerston
- RAF Topcliffe
- RAF Valley
- RAF Waddington
- RAF Weston-on-the-Green
- RAF Wittering
- RAF Woodvale
- RAF Wyton
- RRH Benbecula
- RRH Brizlee Wood
- RRH Buchan
- RRH Neatishead
- RRH Portreath
- RRH Staxton Wold
- RRH Saxa Vord
- Cape Wrath Air Weapons Range
- Donna Nook Air Weapons Range
- Holbeach Air Weapons Range
- Pembrey Sands Air Weapons Range
- Tain Air Weapons Range
- MOD Aberporth
- MOD Boscombe Down
- MOD Hebrides
- MOD St Athan
- MOD West Freugh
- Aldergrove Flying Station
- Kenley Airfield
- Keevil Airfield
- Kirknewton Airfield
- Leuchars Station
- Little Rissington Airfield
- London Area Control Centre
- Tern Hill Airfield
- Upavon Airfield

=== Overseas air force stations ===
==== British Indian Ocean Territory air force stations ====
- Naval Support Facility Diego Garcia

==== Brunei air force stations ====
- Medicina Lines

==== Cyprus air force stations ====
- Troodos Station

==== Estonia air force stations ====
- Ämari Air Base

==== Falkland Islands air force stations ====
- RAF Mount Pleasant
- RRH Byron Heights
- RRH Mount Alice
- RRH Mount Kent

==== Gibraltar air force stations ====
- RAF Gibraltar

==== Iceland air force stations ====
- Keflavík Airport

==== Lithuania air force stations ====
- Šiauliai Air Base

==== Qatar air force stations ====
- Al Udeid Air Base

==== Romania air force stations ====
- Mihail Kogalniceanu Air Base

==== Sovereign Base Areas of Akrotiri and Dhekelia air force stations ====
- RAF Akrotiri

==== Saint Helena, Ascension and Tristan da Cunha air force stations ====
- RAF Ascension Island
- RAF Travellers Hill

==== United Arab Emirates air force stations ====
- Donnelly Lines

==== United States air force stations ====
- Edwards Air Force Base

== See also ==
- List of countries with overseas military bases
- Lists of military installations
- British Empire
- List of wars involving the United Kingdom
