= Military of the Falkland Islands =

British Forces South Atlantic Islands
- Flag of the British Forces South Atlantic Islands
- Active: 1985 – present
- Country: United Kingdom
- Branch: Royal Navy; British Army; Royal Air Force
- Type: Joint tri-service command
- Role: Command of British military forces in the South Atlantic
- Size: c. 1,300 – c. 1,700 military and civilian personnel (as of 2022)
- Part of: Cyber & Specialist Operations Command
- Headquarters: Mount Pleasant Complex, Falkland Islands

Commanders
- Commander British Forces South Atlantic Islands: Brigadier Charlie Harmer (as of June 2025)

Aircraft flown
- Fighter: Typhoon FGR4
- Multirole helicopter: AgustaWestland AW189; Sikorsky S-92 (both civilian operated)
- Transport: A400M Atlas C1; Voyager KC2

The Falkland Islands are a British overseas territory and, as such, rely on the United Kingdom for the guarantee of their security. The other British territories in the South Atlantic, South Georgia and the South Sandwich Islands, fall under the protection of British Forces South Atlantic Islands (BFSAI), formerly known as British Forces Falkland Islands (BFFI), which includes commitments from the British Army, Royal Air Force and Royal Navy. They are headed by the Commander, British Forces South Atlantic Islands (CBFSAI), a brigadier-equivalent appointment that rotates among all three services (Navy, British Army, and RAF).

Argentina invaded and took control of the Falklands on 2 April 1982. After recapturing the territory in June 1982, the UK invested heavily in the defence of the islands, the centrepiece of which was a new airfield at RAF Mount Pleasant, 27 miles (43 km) west of Stanley. The base was opened in 1985, and became fully operational in 1986.

== Falkland Islands Defence Force ==
The Falkland Islands maintains its own part-time volunteer force, the Falkland Islands Defence Force (FIDF), previously known as the Falkland Islands Volunteer Corps. Although this unit existed in 1982 as a reinforcement for the Governor's detachment of Royal Marines, it did not play any part in the main conflict during the war of 1982, its members having spent the duration of the hostilities under house arrest by the Argentines after their surrender on the Argentine capture of the islands. The FIDF is now a platoon to company-strength light infantry unit with a permanent training Warrant Officer seconded from the Royal Marines. The FIDF operates in a number of roles and is fully integrated into the defence scheme for the islands.

FIDF soldiers can deploy aboard the Falklands Government Fisheries Protection vessel for sovereignty protection duties if the vessel requires an armed presence. As of 2023, the Falklands Government fisheries protection vessel is the FPV Lilibet, which arrived in the islands in April and is tasked with policing the exclusive economic zone around the islands. (Another vessel, Pharos SG, is contracted by the Government of South Georgia and the South Sandwich Islands (GSGSSI) for the purpose of sovereignty protection in its waters).

Lilibet is named in honour of the late Queen Elizabeth II, and has been chartered to the Falklands Government by Seagull Maritime Limited for fifteen years starting in 2022. Civilian-crewed, the vessel is a Damen Stan 5009 patrol ship with a maximum speed of up to 29.5 knots (54.6 km/h; 33.9 mph) and a crew of up to 28 persons. She has an endurance of 30 days, though sixty days of provisions can be carried. If patrolling at 10 knots she can reportedly operate for 42 days with a range of up to 10,000 nautical miles. She is fitted for two Browning .50 caliber heavy machine gun mounts though she routinely deploys unarmed.

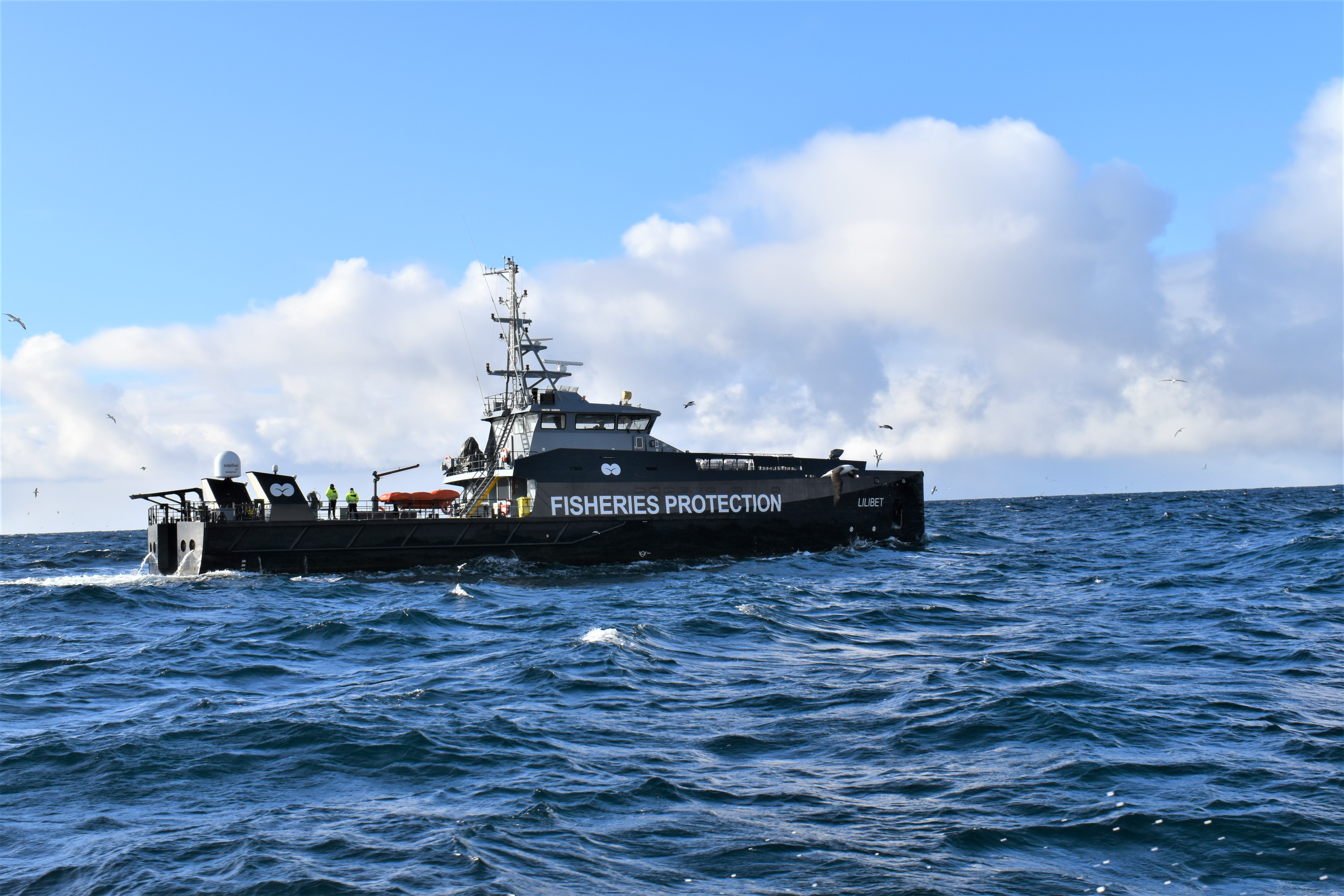
FPV Lilibet on patrol in the South Atlantic, July 2023

== Royal Navy ==
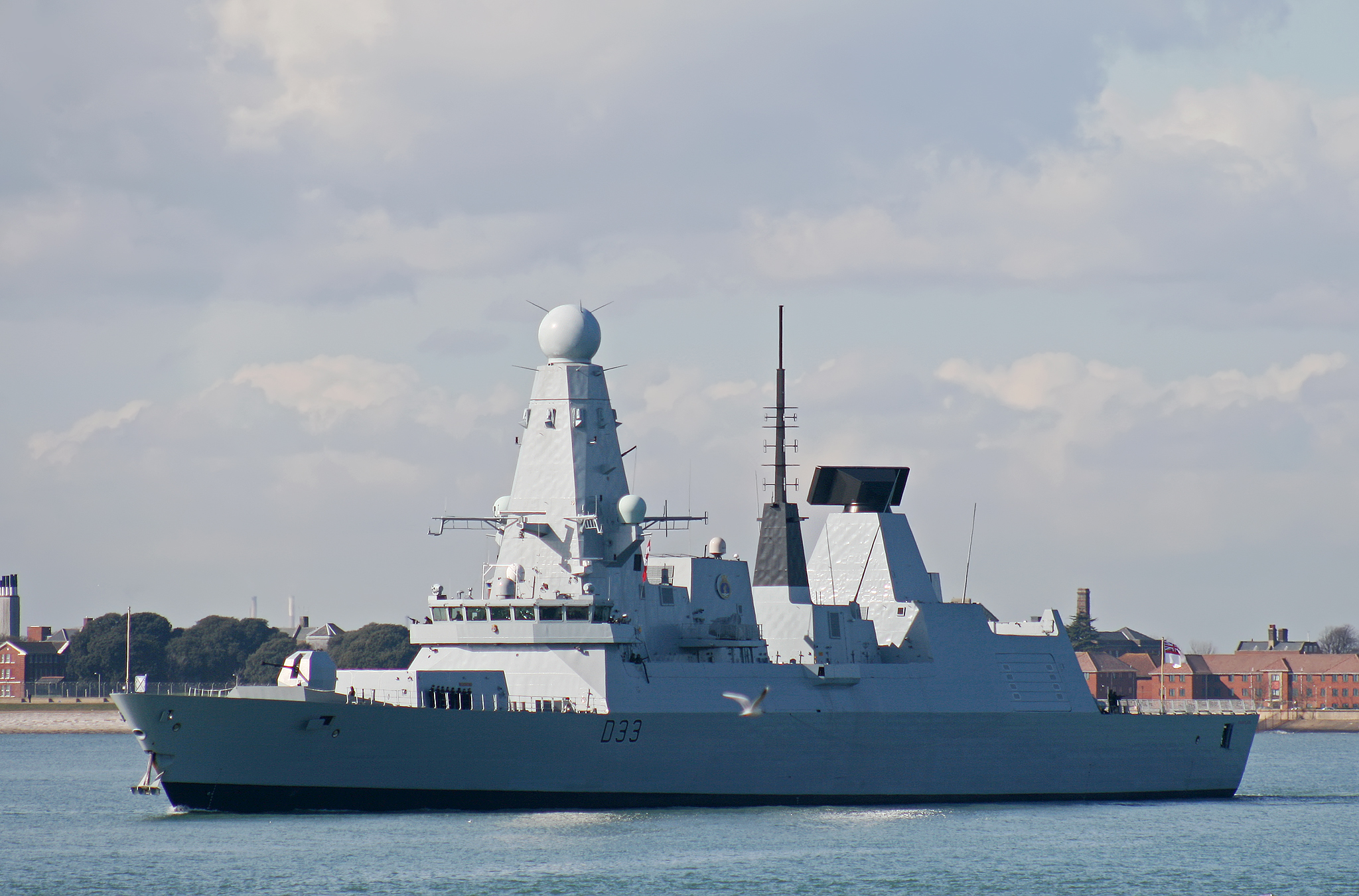
HMS Dauntless, a Type 45 guided missile destroyer.

RAF Mount Pleasant has its own port facility called Mare Harbour, operated by Naval Party 2010 (NP2010). The Royal Navy deploys a River-class offshore patrol vessel, HMS Medway, in the south Atlantic and the ship is the principal naval presence permanently close to the islands. In addition, an Ice Patrol Ship, HMS Protector, was normally on station close to Antarctica during the regional summer months. However, due to technical problems with the ship, she was unable to deploy to the South Atlantic in either the 2025/26 or 2026/27 regional summer seasons, making her future role uncertain until she was replaced.

Prior to 2015 a major warship and RFA vessel commonly carried out the Atlantic Patrol Task (South) mission, which provides for "a maritime presence to protect the UK's interests in the region". The Type 42 destroyer HMS Edinburgh took over the South Atlantic Patrol Task in October 2006, replacing HMS Southampton. Prior to Southampton's deployment in August 2005, the role was filled by HMS Cardiff, which was decommissioned on return to the UK. As of February 2010, the on-station warship was the Type 42 destroyer HMS York. In late April 2010, York was relieved by the Type 23 frigate HMS Portland. In August 2010, Portland was relieved by the Type 42 destroyer HMS Gloucester. On 21 April 2011, York returned to the East Cove Military Port in the Falkland Islands, beginning patrol duties for the islands. October 2011 saw the arrival of the Type 23 frigate HMS Montrose, generating a statement from UNASUR (Union of South American Nations). The Type 45 guided missile destroyer HMS Dauntless replaced Montrose as of April 2012. In the second half of 2013, HMS Richmond was deployed on the Royal Navy's south Atlantic patrol duty. Portland was deployed in January 2014, followed by HMS Lancaster in 2015 and Portland again in late 2016/early 2017 on the return leg of a longer deployment to the Gulf and Indian Ocean. As of 2024, Portland's deployment was the last time a frigate deployed to the Falklands.

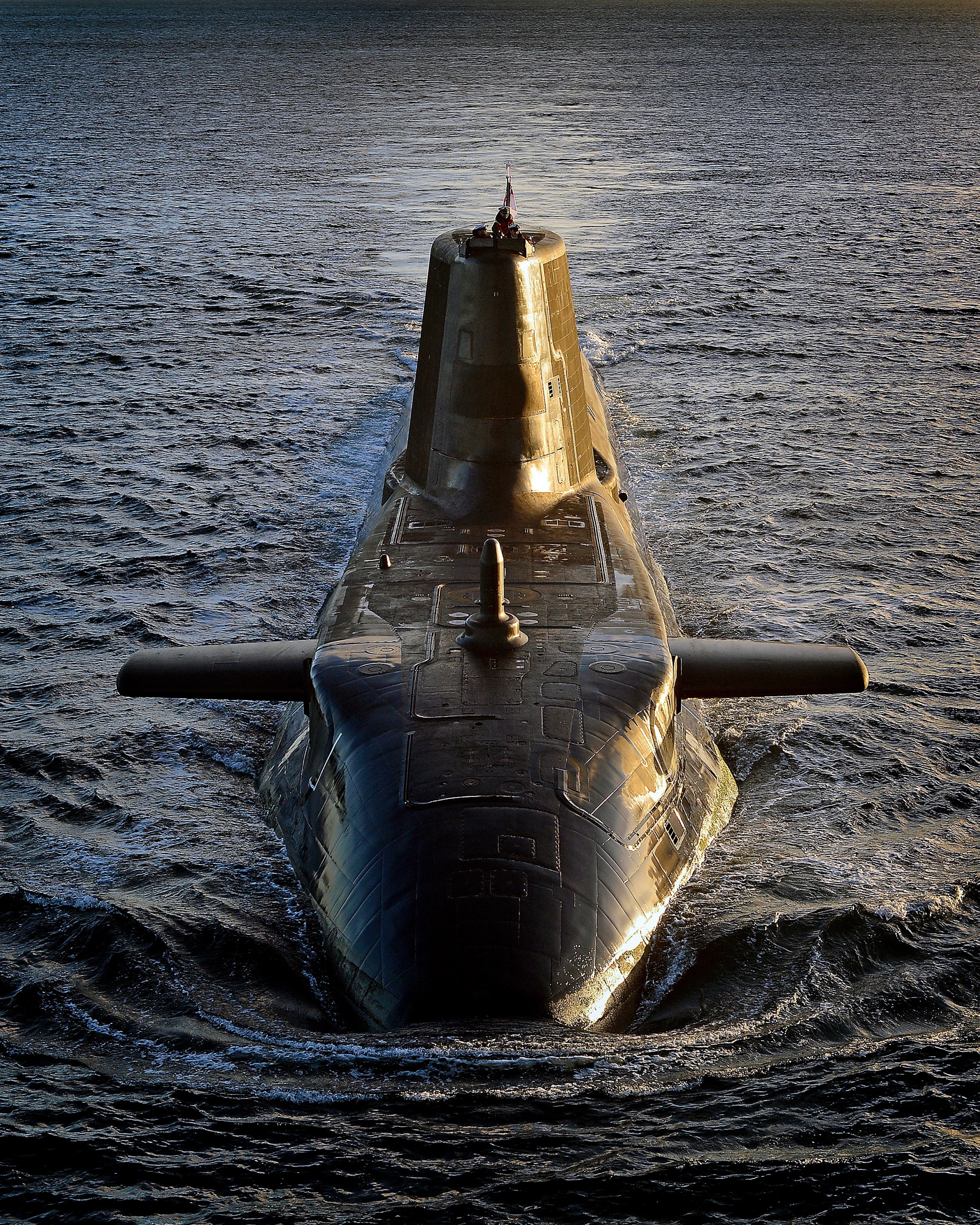
HMS Ambush, a Astute-class nuclear submarine

Since 2015, with the commitment to deploy a destroyer or frigate scaled back, offshore patrol vessels have been the principal Royal Navy assets permanently deployed in the south Atlantic. In 2020, the River-class offshore patrol vessel HMS Forth was tasked to the south Atlantic mission. The previously deployed vessel, HMS Clyde, returned to Britain in late 2019 for decommissioning, after itself having relieved the Castle-class patrol vessels HMS Dumbarton Castle and HMS Leeds Castle which maintained the patrol vessel commitment on rotation up to 2007. HMS Medway temporarily replaced Forth in 2023 during her refit. In early 2026, HMS Medway again replaced HMS Forth as the latter vessel returned to the U.K..

The Royal Navy also has Astute-class nuclear submarines that it can deploy to the area, though such deployments are classified and likely rare. In February 2012, a submarine of the former Trafalgar-class may have been deployed to the Falkland Islands. The threat posed by submarines to hostile ships was demonstrated during the Falklands War when HMS Conqueror sank the Argentine cruiser ARA General Belgrano. The Royal Navy's current fleet submarines also carry BGM-109 Tomahawk cruise missiles, which have a range of 1,500 miles (2,400 km).

== British Army ==
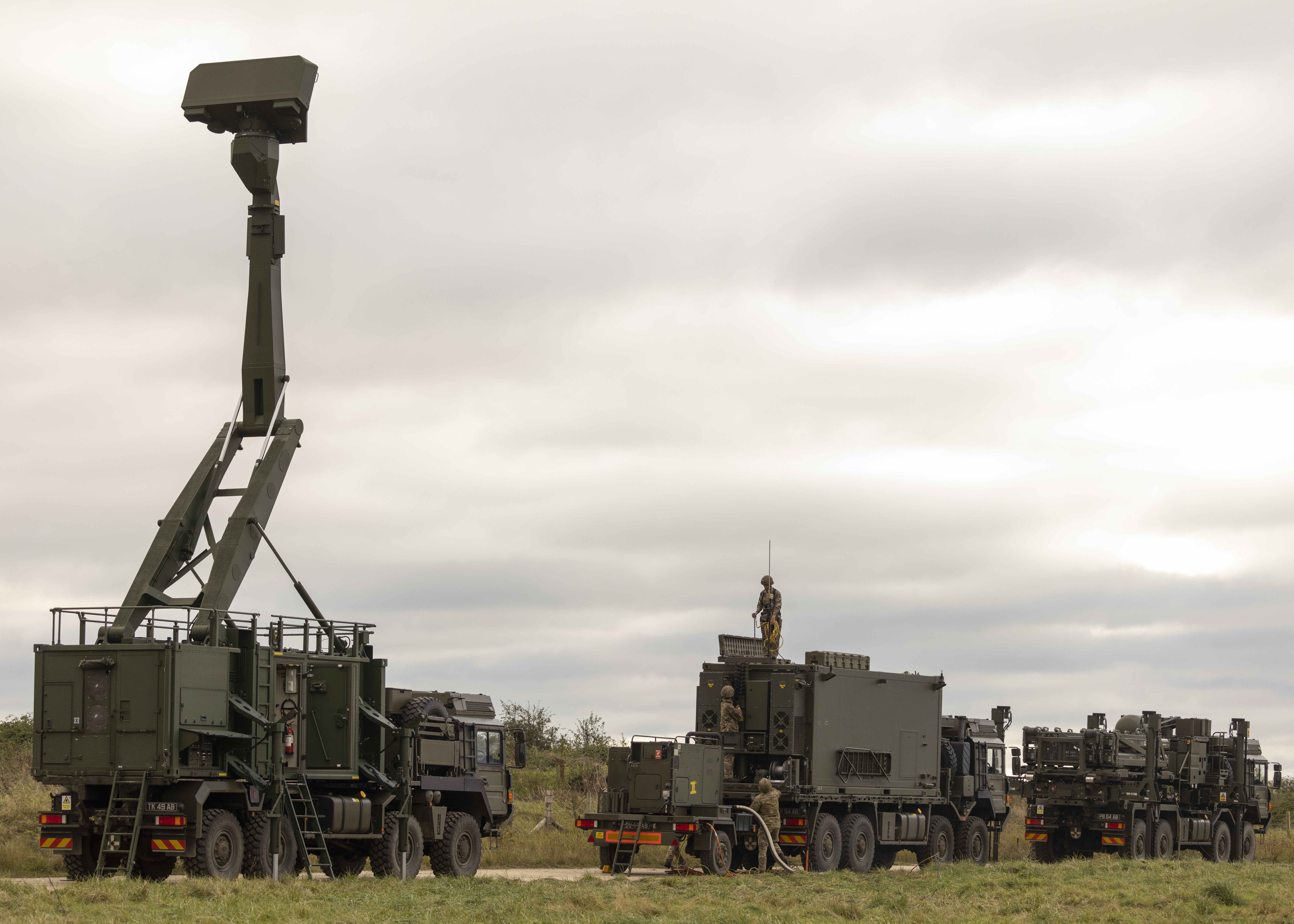
Sky Sabre: radar targeting system, command and control and missile launcher vehicles

The British Army maintains a garrison on the Falkland Islands based at Mount Pleasant. The force is made up of a roulement infantry company, an engineer squadron, a signals unit (part of the Joint Communications Unit – see below), a logistics group and supporting services.

Ground-based air defence of RAF Mount Pleasant is provided by the 16th Regiment Royal Artillery of the British Army's 7th Air Defence Group. Up until 2021, the detachment was equipped with the Rapier FSC surface-to-air missile system. Rapier has been replaced with the new Sky Sabre surface-to-air missile system incorporating an expanded capability. Sky Sabre achieved informal initial operating capability at RAF Mount Pleasant in October 2021. In the same month Rapier was fully withdrawn from service on the Falklands.

The British Army contributed to the Joint Service Explosive Ordnance Disposal group in the Falkland Islands, providing 33 Engineer Regiment (EOD) and RLC EOD teams. This was subsequently reduced to a team of 11 personnel. In November 2020, it was announced that all remaining land mines had been cleared from the islands.

== Royal Air Force ==
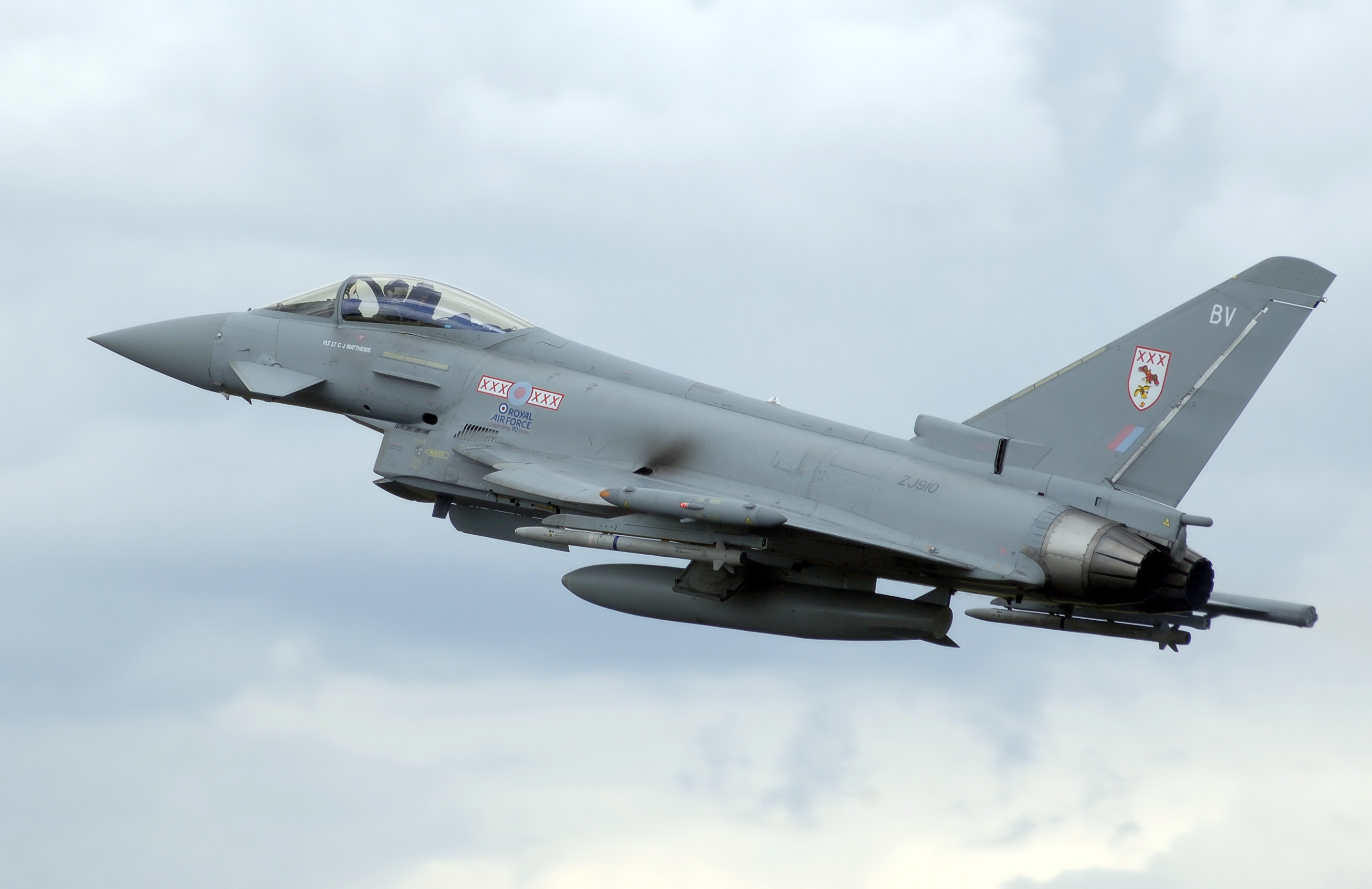
Eurofighter Typhoon

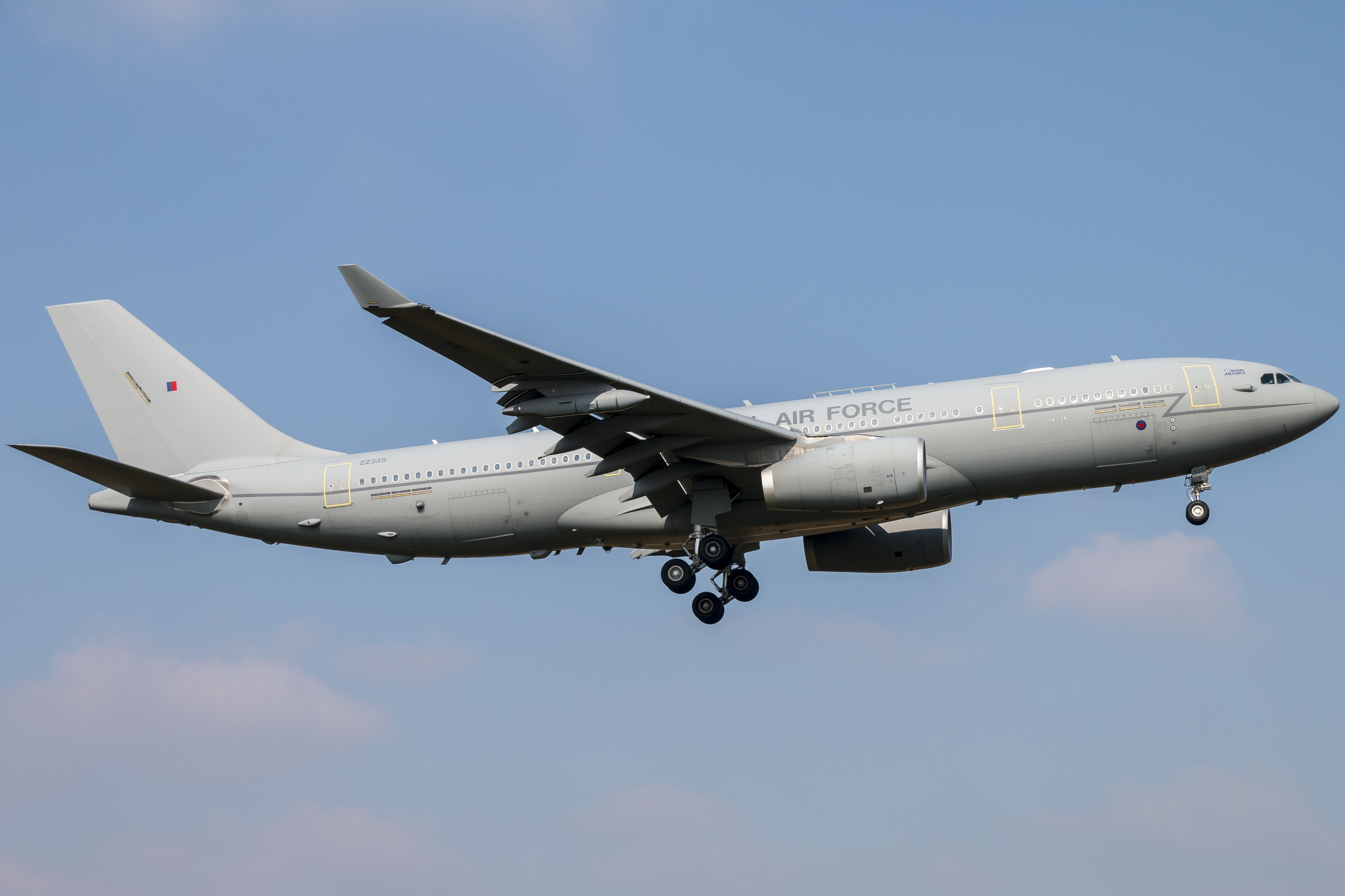
Voyager KC2

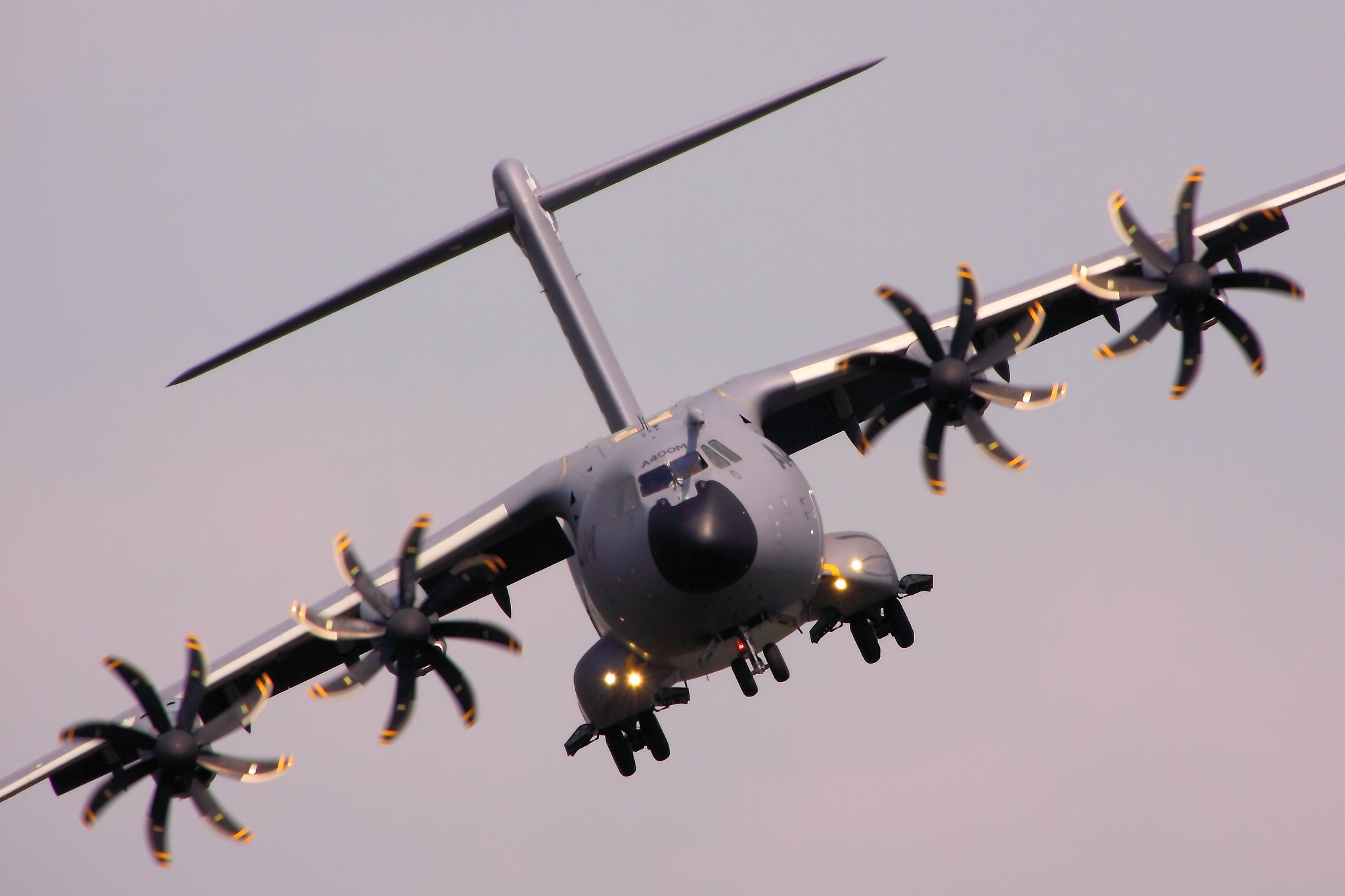
A400M

Royal Air Force elements in the Falklands are under the command of No. 905 Expeditionary Air Wing which, as of 2023, consists of two flights: Typhoon multi-role fighters of No. 1435 Flight RAF and Voyager KC.2/A400M Atlas aircraft of No. 1312 Flight RAF.

RAF Mount Pleasant was built in 1985–86, able to accept large trans-Atlantic aircraft such as the Lockheed TriStar. The TriStar was initially purchased mainly for the UK-Falklands route; until their entry into service, the UK used leased 747s and 767s.

Four Tranche 1 Typhoon fighter aircraft of No. 1435 Flight RAF provide air defence for the islands and surrounding territories.

Originally Lockheed Hercules C.1K were used for air-to-air refuelling missions, but these were later replaced by a VC10. On 31 August 2013 the VC10 was temporarily replaced by a TriStar K.1, which was itself replaced by a Voyager KC.2 in March 2014. The Voyager is deployed in the islands for air refueling operations but is unable to fit within a hangar at RAF Mount Pleasant due to its size. In April 2026, it was reported that the Voyager aircraft on station had been temporarily withdrawn in order to support U.K. military operations in response to the Iran War.

Initially, a C-130 Hercules was used for transport, search and rescue and maritime patrol until replaced with an A400M Atlas aircraft in April 2018. The aircraft is used for both regional operations, as well as for providing support for the British Antarctic Survey. In August 2022, an RAF A400M aircraft flying from RAF Ascension Island was refueled for the first time by a Voyager KC.2 aircraft flying out of RAF Mount Pleasant. In January 2023, an RAF A400M Atlas supported by a Voyager tanker aircraft, dropped the first of 300 fuel drums as part of a tasking to resupply the Sky Blu facility of the British Antarctic Survey.

For a lengthy period, the helicopters of No. 1564 Flight (formerly No. 78 Squadron) provided tactial air transport support. The Sea Kings carried out short and medium range search and rescue missions, until their retirement. AAR Corp was awarded a contract for helicopter search and rescue services in the Falkland Islands to replace 1564 Flight, using AgustaWestland AW189 helicopters in the role from 2016. In March 2015, the UK announced that a pair of Chinooks would be stationed in the Falklands again, the first of which started flying in June 2016. 1564 Flight disbanded in March 2016 being subsequently replaced by the Chinooks of No. 1310 Flight.

These military helicopters only remained on the islands for a short period and, as of 2022, Chinooks are no longer based in the Falklands. In lieu of this military capability, the firms AAR Corp and British International Helicopters (part of Bristow Helicopters), jointly provide two AW189s (in the Search and Rescue role) and two Sikorsky S92A helicopters (in the support role) from RAF Mount Pleasant. The latter helicopter replaced the formerly used S61N helicopter in 2023.

There were initially two air defence radar units, both located on West Falkland; No. 7 Signals Unit at Byron Heights and No. 751 Signals Unit at Mount Alice. Byron Heights and Mount Alice were later augmented by a further radar installation on Mount Kent, designated No. 303 Signals Unit. No. 7 Signals Unit and No. 751 Signals Unit were eventually disbanded and all three radar installations were reduced to Remote Radar Heads under the control of No. 303 Signals Unit who moved into a purpose-built operations building at Mount Pleasant Complex to form the Control and Reporting Centre in 1998.

=== Organisation ===
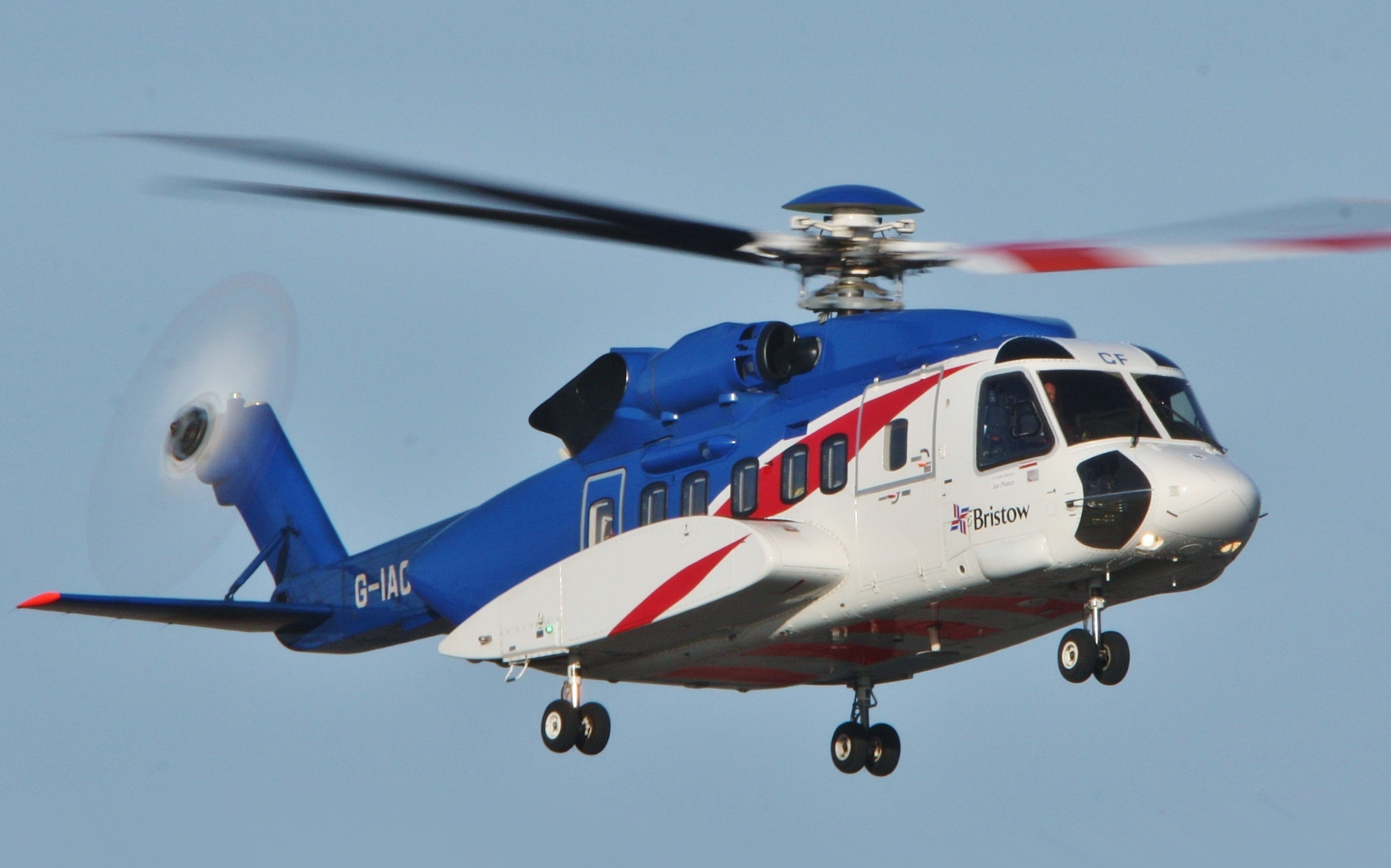
Bristow Helicopters Sikorsky S-92

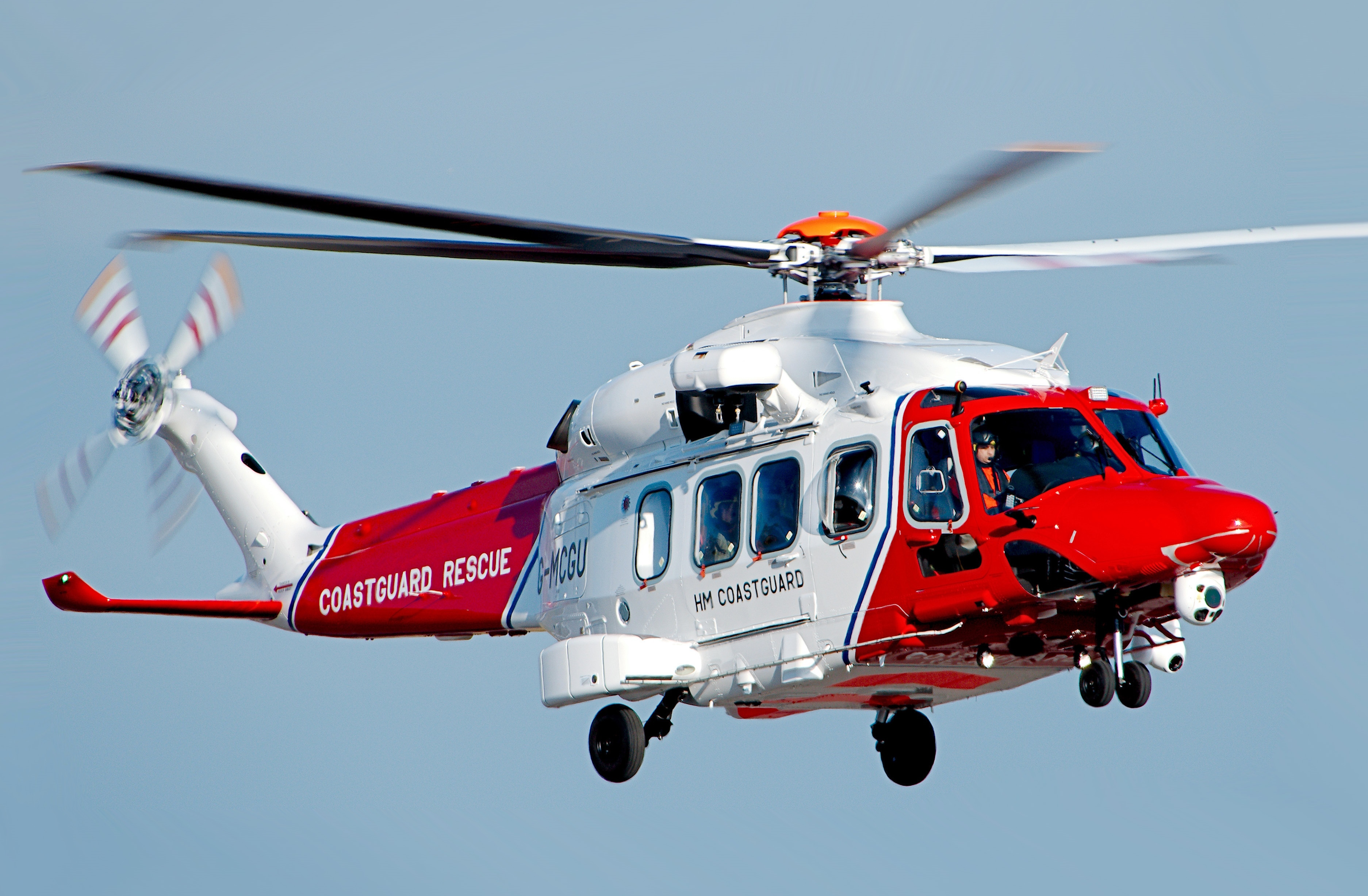
AgustaWestland AW189

- No. 905 Expeditionary Air Wing
  - No. 1435 Flight – 4 Eurofighter Typhoons
  - No. 1312 Flight – 1 Voyager KC2, 1 Airbus A400M Atlas
- Bristow Helicopters/AAR Corp civilian-crewed aircraft
  - 2 x Sikorsky S-92A (support role)
  - 2 x AgustaWestland AW189 (SAR role)

== Joint Service ==
The Joint Communications Unit Falkland Islands (JCUFI) provides the electronic warfare and command and control systems for the Royal Navy, Army and RAF stationed there. It incorporates the Army's signals unit and RAF personnel.

== Commanders ==
The following have served as Commander British Forces Falkland Islands/South Atlantic Islands:

- Major General Sir David Thorne, CBFFI (1982–1983)
- Major General Keith Spacie, CBFFI (1983–1984)
- Major General Peter de la Billière, CBFFI (1984–1985) (left post by 20 November 1985)
- Air Marshal Sir John Kemball, CBFFI (1985–1986)
- Rear Admiral Christopher Layman, CBFFI (1986–1987)
- Major General Anthony Carlier (1987–1988)
- Air Vice Marshal David Crwys-Williams (1988–1989)
- Major General Paul Stevenson (1989–1990)
- Major General Malcolm Hunt (1990–1991)
- Air Vice Marshal Peter Beer (1991–1992)
- Rear Admiral Neil Rankin (1992–1993)
- Major General Iain Mackay-Dick (1993–1994)
- Air Commodore Peter Johnson (1994–1995)
- Commodore Alexander Backus (1995–1996)
- Brigadier Iain Campbell (1996–1998)
- Air Commodore Raymond Dixon (1998–1999)
- Brigadier David Nicholls (1999–2000)
- Brigadier Geoff Sheldon (2000–2001)
- Air Vice Marshal John Cliffe (2001–2002)
- Vice Admiral Sir Richard Ibbotson (2002)
- Brigadier James Gordon (2002–2003)
- Air Vice Marshal Richard Lacey (2003–2005)
- Rear Admiral Ian Moncrieff (2005–2006)
- Brigadier Nick Davies (2006–2008)
- Air Commodore Gordon Moulds (2008–2009)
- Commodore Philip Thicknesse (2009–2011)
- Brigadier William Aldridge (2011–2013)
- Air Commodore Russell La Forte (2013–2015)
- Commodore Darren Bone (2015–2017)
- Brigadier Baz Bennett (2017–2018)
- Brigadier Nick Sawyer (2018–2020)
- Commodore Jonathan Lett (2020–2023)
- Brigadier Dan Duff (2023-2025)
- Brigadier Charlie Harmer (2025- )

== British Forces South Atlantic Islands installations ==
Name	Region	Opened	Description
Mount Pleasant Complex	East Falkland	1985	HQ for British Force South Atlantic Islands with approximately 1000 Joint Service personnel permanently deployed.
Falklands Defence Force HQ, Stanley	East Falkland		Falklands Defence Force headquarters on Kiel Canal Road, Stanley
Mare Harbour	East Falkland		Military port for RAF Mount Pleasant; facility for Royal Navy ships in the South Atlantic
RRH Mount Alice	West Falkland		One of two early-warning and airspace control radar sites on West Falkland.
RRH Byron Heights	West Falkland		One of two early-warning and airspace control radar sites on West Falkland.
RRH Mount Kent	East Falkland		An early-warning and airspace control radar site on East Falkland.
RAF Ascension Island	Ascension Island	1942	RAF air staging base to support the "Falklands air bridge" and broader regional operations.

== See also ==
- List of British Army installations
- Argentine Armed Forces
