= HMS Forth (P222) =

2018 River-class offshore patrol vessel of the Royal Navy

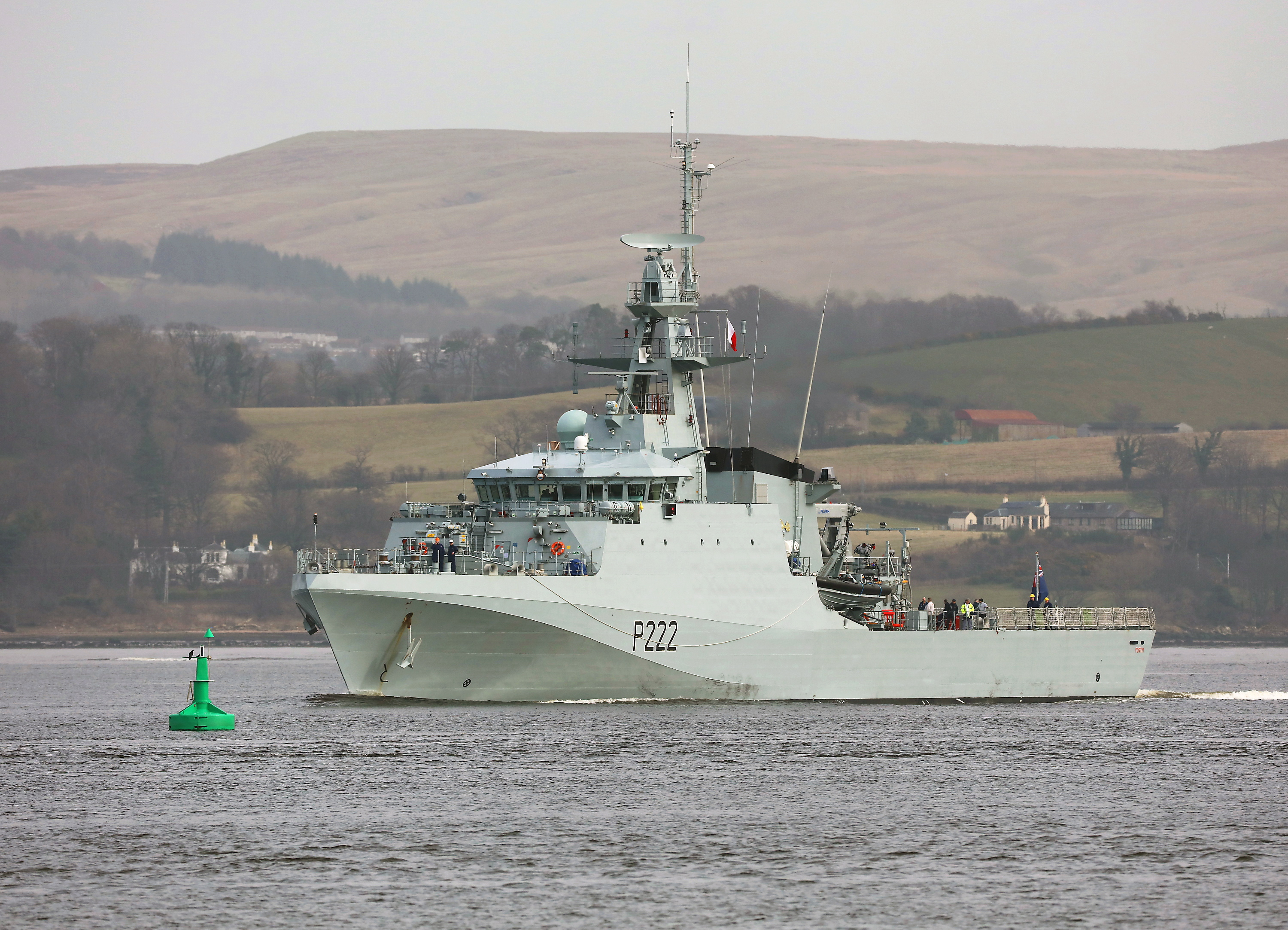

History

United Kingdom
- Name: Forth
- Operator: Royal Navy
- Ordered: August 2014
- Builder: BAE Systems Naval Ships
- Laid down: 10 October 2014 (steel cut)
- Launched: 20 August 2016
- Sponsored by: Rachel Johnstone-Burt
- Christened: 9 March 2017
- Commissioned: 13 April 2018
- Home port: HMNB Portsmouth
- Identification: Pennant number: P222; IMO number: 9752058; MMSI number: 232005742; International call sign: GFTH
- Motto: "Go Forth and Conquer"
- Status: In service
- Badge

General characteristics
- Class & type: Batch 2 River-class patrol vessel
- Displacement: 2,000 tonnes
- Length: 90.5 m (296 ft 11 in)
- Beam: 13 m (42 ft 8 in)
- Draught: 3.8 m (12 ft 6 in)
- Speed: 25 knots (46 km/h; 29 mph)
- Range: 5,500 nmi (10,200 km; 6,300 mi)
- Endurance: 35 days
- Boats & landing craft carried: Two rigid inflatable boats
- Troops: 50 Royal Marines
- Complement: 34-50
- Sensors & processing systems: Kelvin Hughes Ltd SharpEye navigation radar; Terma Scanter 4100 2D radar; BAE CMS-1; Shared Infrastructure operating system
- Armament: 1 × 30 mm cannon; 2 × general purpose machine guns; 2 × miniguns (replaced by Browning .50 caliber heavy machine guns as of 2023)
- Aviation facilities: Merlin-capable flight deck

HMS Forth is a Batch 2 River-class offshore patrol vessel in active service with the Royal Navy. Named after the River Forth, she is the first Batch 2 River-class vessel to be built. She was commissioned into the Royal Navy on 13 April 2018, following a commissioning ceremony at her homeport HMNB Portsmouth. In January 2020 she replaced HMS Clyde as the Falkland Islands patrol ship, a tasking which predominated her overseas deployments from 2020 to the end of 2025.

== Construction ==
On 6 November 2013, it was announced that the Royal Navy had signed an agreement in principle to build three new offshore patrol vessels based on the River-class design similar to the larger Amazonas-class corvette derivative built at a fixed price of £348 million, including spares and support. In August 2014, BAE Systems signed a contract to build the ships on the River Clyde. The ships, which were designated Batch 2 of the River class, were to be globally-deployable and capable of carrying out constabulary tasks, such as counter-terrorism, counter-piracy and anti-smuggling. As the first ship of the new batch, Forth included some 29 modifications and enhancements over the baseline Amazonas design.

Steel was first cut for Forth on 10 October 2014 at BAE Systems' Govan shipyard in Glasgow. She was launched in September 2016, being floated off a semi-submersible barge in the Clyde rather than receiving a traditional dynamic launch. After launch, she was moved down the Clyde for fitting out at BAE Systems' Scotstoun shipyard. She was christened at a ceremony at Scotstoun on 9 March 2017. In late March 2017, it was announced that the crew of Batch 1 vessel HMS Tyne would be transferred to Forth to bring her into service.

On 31 August 2017, Forth sailed for contractor sea trials. It was reported in October 2017 that Forth had been earmarked to replace HMS Clyde as the Falkland Islands guardship.

It was announced on 25 January 2018 that Forth had been accepted by the Ministry of Defence from BAE Systems and would shortly sail to HM Naval Base Portsmouth for commissioning. She arrived in Portsmouth for the first time on 26 February 2018.

== Operational history ==
=== Commissioning and early faults ===
Forth was commissioned into the Royal Navy on 13 April 2018 following a ceremony at HMNB Portsmouth.

Soon after her commissioning, some faults were identified with her electrical system and sheared bolts were also discovered with heads that had been glued back on. In June 2018, it was announced that Forth would be entering dry dock for major rectification work which was likely to take more than three months. The Royal Navy reactivated HMS Tyne to cover planned patrols by Forth with BAE Systems covering the additional costs. In October, Anderson Smith, BAE Systems Commercial Director – Naval Ships, admitted that "minor defects" had been found but announced that they had since been fixed.

In June 2019, Forth underwent operational sea training in British waters in preparation for her first operational deployment. She later sailed from Liverpool to escort a Russian Navy patrol ship which was transiting through the UK's area of interest. She then made her inaugural fishery protection patrol and her first visit to an overseas port, which was to Gibraltar before again escorting the same Russian ship through the English Channel.

=== Falkland Islands ===
On 13 January 2020, Forth arrived at the East Cove Military Port in the Falkland Islands on her first operational deployment, taking over from her older half-sister Clyde as the permanently-stationed guardship. Prior to her arrival, she exercised with Royal Air Force Typhoon FGR4 interceptors to trial how the platforms could operate together. As part of her deployment, Forth was on standby to assist the island's authorities in anything from ceremonial events to emergencies. Her support also extended to the nearby South Georgia and South Sandwich Islands. On 21 April 2021, Forth traveled to the island of Tristan da Cunha and delivered enough of the Oxford–AstraZeneca COVID-19 vaccine for the island's entire population to be completely vaccinated.

Chile prevented in 2022 the resupplying of HMS Forth' in Punta Arenas, a move that was seen as favourable to Argentine interests.

In February/March 2023, Forth sailed to Gibraltar for refit and was replaced in the South Atlantic by HMS Medway. As part of this refit she has been painted in a new camouflage like her sister ships HMS Tamar and HMS Spey. She completed her refit and departed Gibraltar to return to the South Atlantic in September 2023. Forth remained in the Falkland Islands until the start of 2026, when she was recalled to the UK to be replaced by HMS Medway.

== Affiliations ==
- City of Stirling
- TS Forth, Grangemouth
- Worshipful Company of Builders Merchants
- The Governor of Edinburgh Castle
- London Scottish Regimental Trust
- Scottish and North Irish Yeomanry
- Deanston Distillery
- Lord Lieutenant of Stirling and Falkirk
