= Paul Stevenson (Royal Marines officer) =

British royal marine, pentathlete

Major-General Paul Stevenson OBE
- Born: 9 March 1940
- Died: 28 January 2023 (aged 82)
- Military career
- Allegiance: United Kingdom
- Branch: Royal Marines
- Service years: 1956–1991
- Rank: Major-General
- Commands: British Forces Falkland Islands (1989–90); 42 Commando (1983–84)
- Conflicts: The Troubles; Falklands War
- Awards: Officer of the Order of the British Empire

Major-General Paul Timothy Stevenson, OBE (9 March 1940 – 28 January 2023) was a Royal Marines officer who served as commander of the British Forces Falkand Islands, and commanded 42 Commando during The Troubles in Northern Ireland.

== Military career ==
Stevenson joined the Royal Marines Forces Volunteer Reserve in 1956 and was commissioned as a regular officer in November 1958. After completing training, he served two tours with 41 Commando in 1961. He then deployed with 45 Commando in Aden in 1962–63 as a troop commander, and served aboard HMS Mohawk from 1965 to 1968. During this time he deployed to the Gulf and Beira Patrol as well as Bermuda and the West Indies.

Stevenson became Parade Adjutant of the Royal Marine Depot, Deal from 1968 to 1971. Following this, he returned to 45 Commando for multiple deployments to Norway and South Armagh in Northern Ireland between 1972 and 1975. He then served as Amphibious Operations Officer (AOO) aboard HMS Bulwark from 1975 to 1976. He served as General Staff Officer (GSO2) Mountain and Arctic Warfare at Headquarters Commando Forces in Plymouth from 1976 to 1978, before spending two years on the directing staff at the Naval Staff College in Greenwich.

Following the Argentine invasion of the Falkland Islands in 1982, Stevenson served as GSO1 on the staff of Land Forces Falkland Islands during Operation Corporate. He presented the landing plan to the Prime Minister and War Cabinet, before later assisting with the negotiation of the Argentine surrender in Port Stanley. In 1983 Stevenson was appointed commanding officer of 42 Commando during deployment in Norway and then South Armagh (1984). He was mentioned in dispatches for his contributions and bravery in Northern Ireland.

Stevenson returned to Headquarters Commando forces as GSO1 from 1984 to 1985, and then attended the NATO Defence College in Rome in 1986. He was then appointed Director of Royal Marines Manning and Personnel Services. In 1989 he was promoted to major general and was appointed Commander British Forces Falkland Islands from 1989 to 1990. He retired from the Royal Marines in 1991.

== Sporting career ==
Stevenson competed in Modern Pentathlon while serving with the Royal Marines. He was Combined Services Champion, and was runner-up in the British Championships in 1962. Later he was team manager and reserve for the British Modern Pentathlon team in the 1964 Tokyo Olympics. He returned to the British team for the 1969 World Championships in Budapest. He competed in the British Biathlon and Cross-Country ski team, and was the team manager for the British Biathlon team in 1964–65. He competed in the 70-kilometre Oslo to Eidsvoll and 90-kilometre Vasaloppet ski marathons in Sweden during this period.

== Later life ==
After retiring from the Royal Marines, Stevenson became Clerk to the Worshipful Company of Carpenters.

He died on 28 January 2023.

== Honours ==
In 1975, Stevenson was appointed a Member of the Order of the British Empire (MBE), in recognition of his distinguished service in Northern Ireland. He was promoted to Officer of the Order of the British Empire (OBE) in the 1985 Birthday Honours in recognition of his command of 42 Commando.
