= Mount Kent =

Mountain in the Falkland Islands

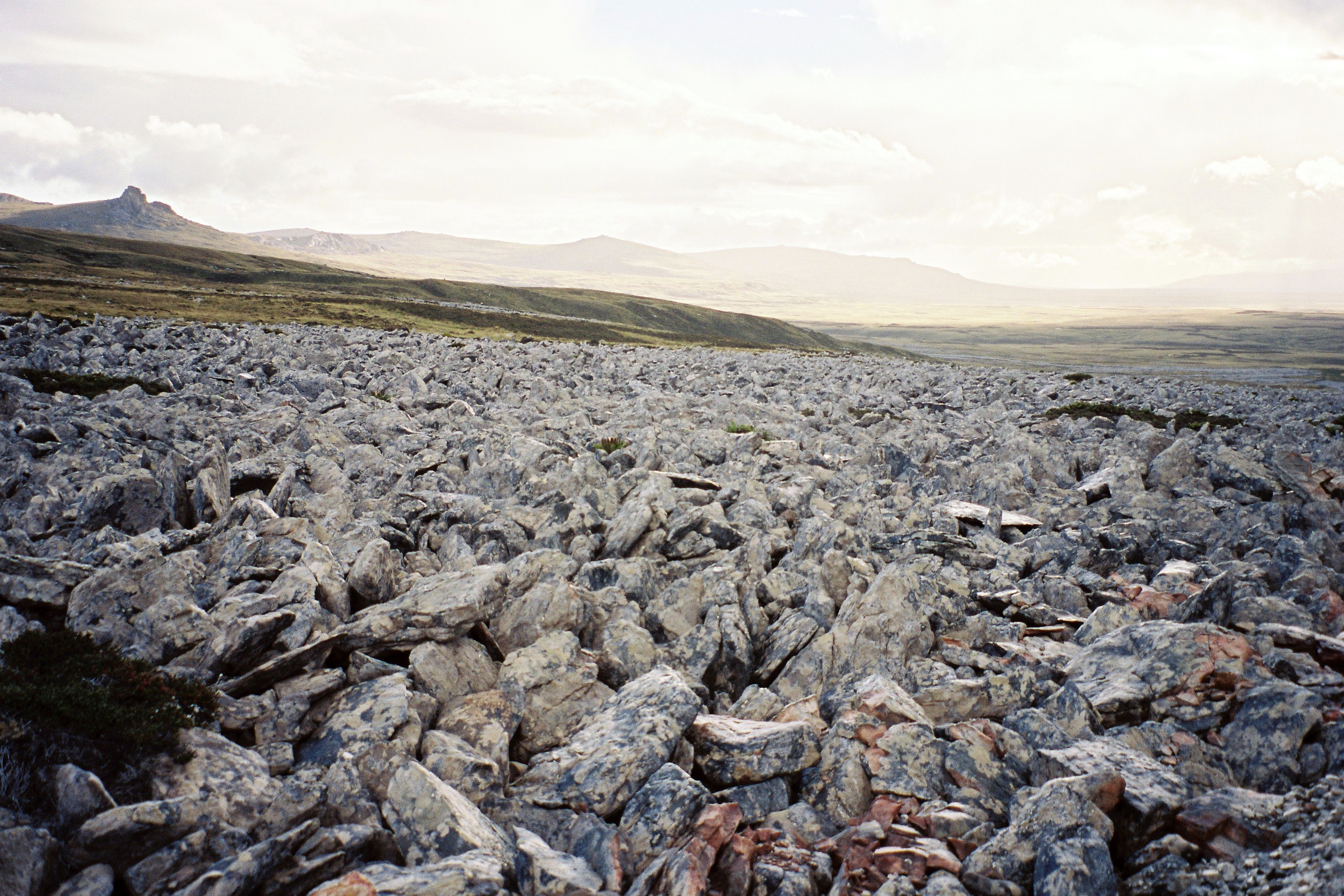
- Stone run at Mount Kent

Highest point
- Elevation: 458 m (1,501 ft)
- Coordinates: 51.6735°S 58.1130°W

Geography
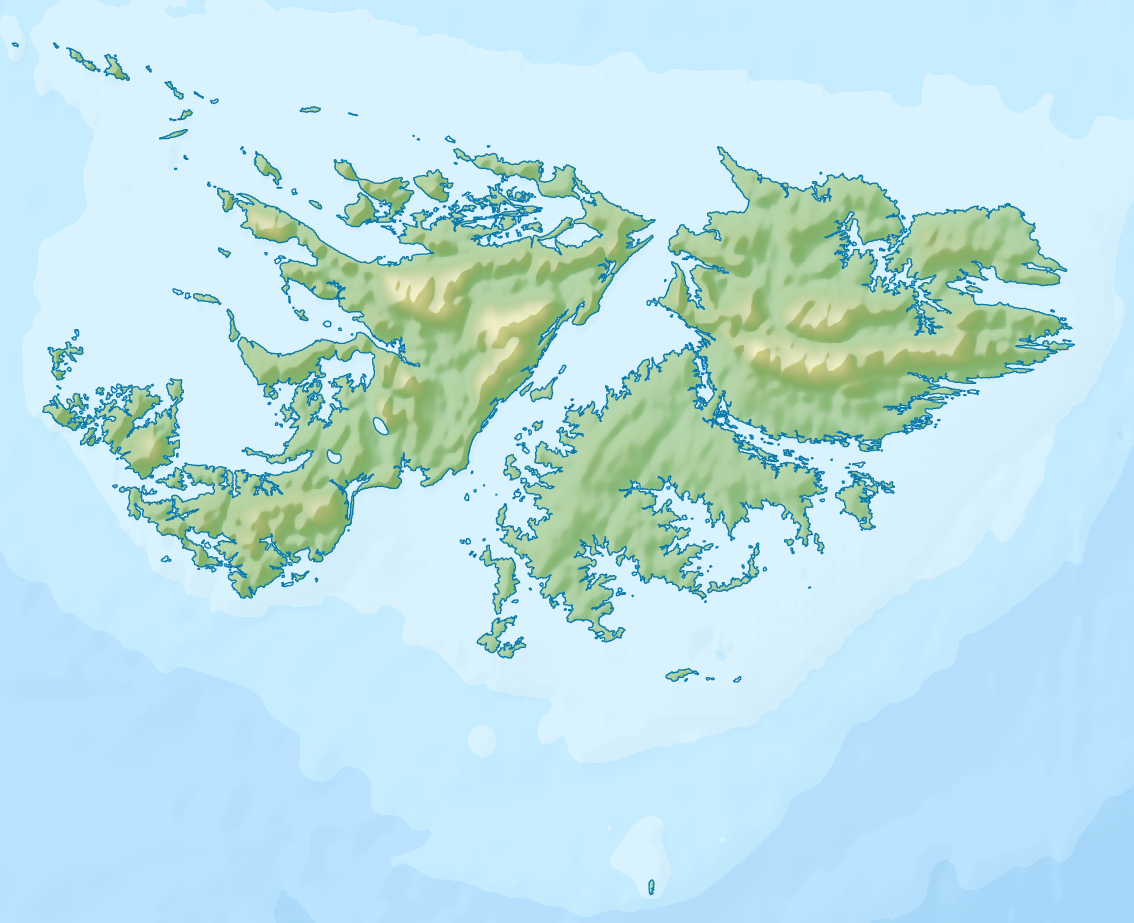
- Location within Falkland Islands
- Location: East Falkland, Falkland Islands, south Atlantic Ocean

Mount Kent is a hill on East Falkland, Falkland Islands, and its peak is 458 metres (1,501 ft) above sea level. It is located north of Mount Challenger some 15 kilometres (9.3 mi) west of Stanley.

== History ==
Position of Mount Kent relative to other surrounding hills

The hill saw action during the Falklands War during the Assault on Mount Kent, part of the larger Battle of Mount Harriet. It was from his command post on Mount Kent that Major-General Jeremy Moore famously radioed "Falkland Islands once more under Government desired by their inhabitants. God Save the Queen." Some parts of the hill still had landmines left over from the Falklands War, but all of the Falkland Islands were de-mined by 2020.

The hill's top is occupied by the RRH Mount Kent (Remote Radar Head Mount Kent) of the British Forces South Atlantic Islands (BFSAI), part of an early warning and airspace control network including also RRH Mount Alice and RRH Byron Heights on West Falkland. The accommodation and working areas of the base were completely rebuilt between 2016 and 2025, having previously been made up of containers which had been there since 1984. The remains of two Argentine helicopters still lie on the northern flank of Mount Kent.

The slopes of Mount Kent are also recognised for the presence of stone runs. The stones are quartzite blocks which belong to the Silurian-Devonian (West Falkland Group).

The hill is named after the County of Kent in England, where Charles Darwin was living at the time that he set sail on the HMS Beagle expedition, which reached the Falklands in 1863. The Hispanicized version of the name is Cerro Kent.
