= Mount Alice (Falkland Islands) =

Mountain

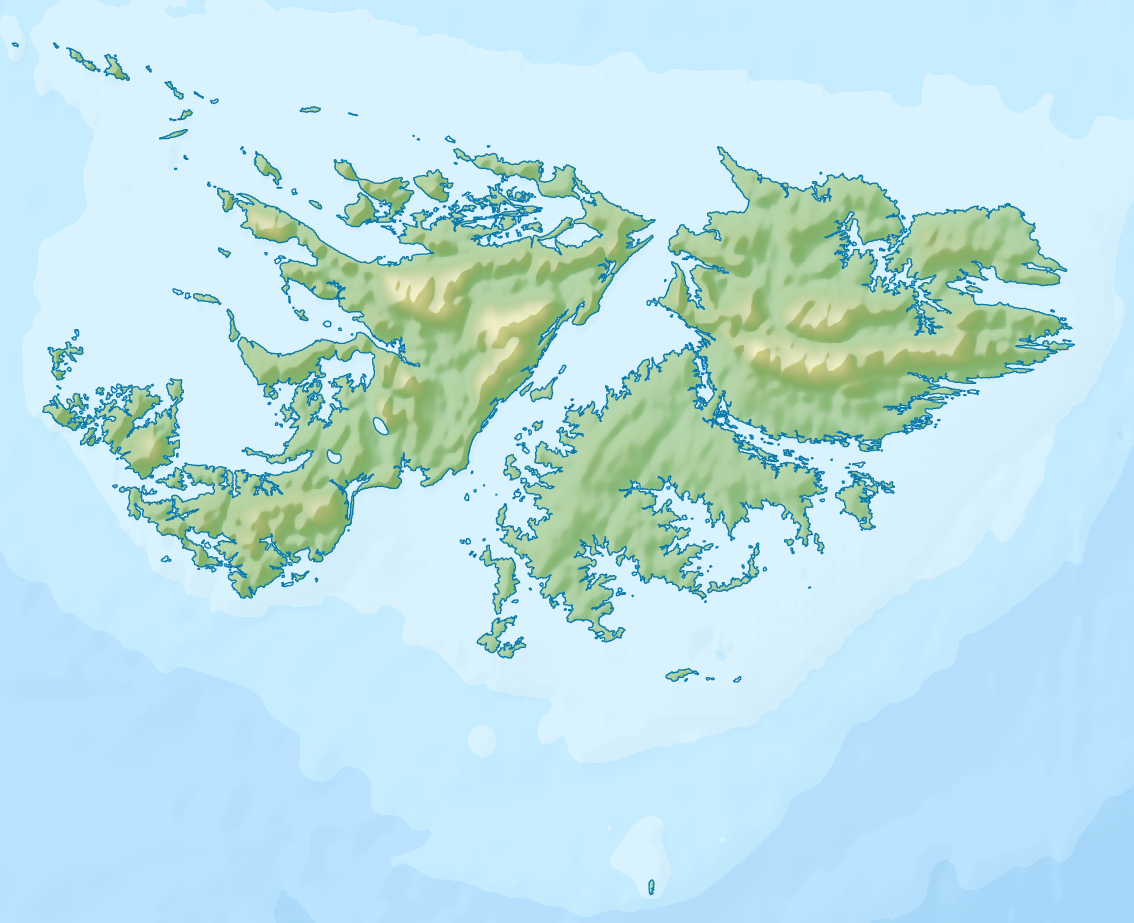
- Location within Falkland Islands

Highest point
- Elevation: 361 m (1,180 ft)
- Prominence: 361 m (1,180 ft)
- Coordinates: 52°09′14″S 60°35′54″W

Geography
- Location: Falkland Islands, South Atlantic Ocean

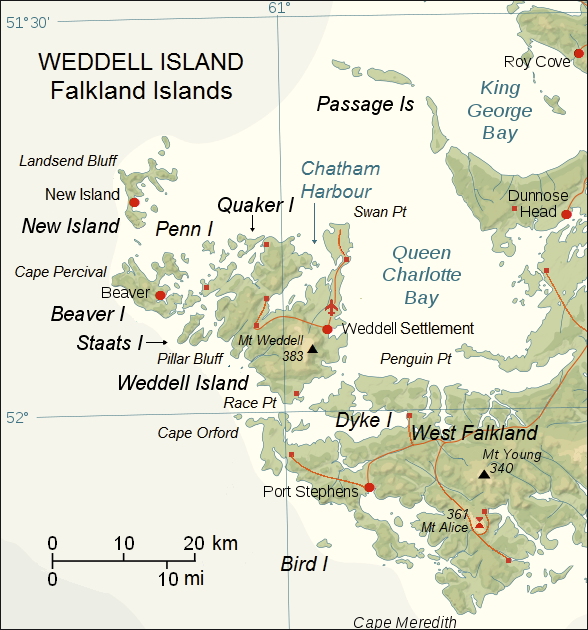
Map of Weddell Island's vicinity featuring the air defence radar station Mount Alice

Mount Alice is a mountain rising to 361 m (1,180 ft) at the south extremity of West Falkland, Falkland Islands in the South Atlantic. It is situated between the bays of Port Stephens and Port Albemarle, 12.3 km (7.6 mi) due north of Cape Meredith.

After the Falklands War the mountain became the home of No. 751 Signals Unit RAF, an air defence radar unit.

The mountain's top is now occupied by Remote Radar Head (RRH) Mount Alice of the British Forces South Atlantic Islands (BFSAI), part of an early warning and airspace control network including also RRH Byron Heights on West Falkland and RRH Mount Kent on East Falkland.
