= Byron Heights =

Mountain range on West Falkland in the Falkland Islands

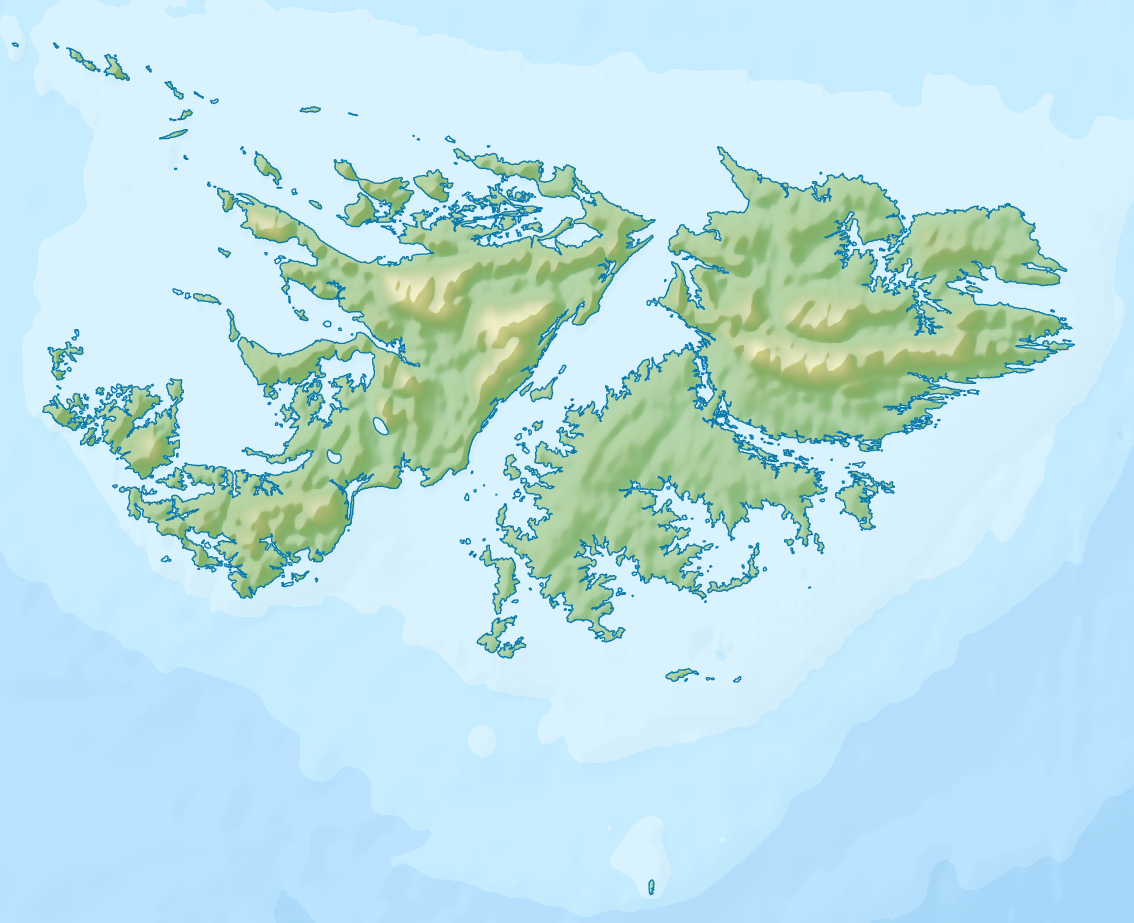
- Location within Falkland Islands

Highest point
- Elevation: 497 m (1,630 ft)
- Prominence: 497 m (1,630 ft)
- Coordinates: 51°25′29″S 60°33′53″W

Geography
- Location: Falkland Islands, South Atlantic Ocean

Byron Heights is a mountain rising to 497 m (1,630 ft) at the northwest extremity of West Falkland, Falkland Islands in the South Atlantic. It is situated 11.65 km (7.24 mi) southeast of Hope Point on a narrow peninsula which is subject to exposed weather as it is between two bays.

The mountain's top is occupied by RRH Byron Heights (Remote Radar Head Byron Heights) of the British Forces South Atlantic Islands (BFSAI), part of an early warning and airspace control network including also RRH Mount Alice on West Falkland and RRH Mount Kent on East Falkland. In the 1990s, the radar was a type 94 being operated by a detachment of No. 7 Signals Unit of the Royal Air Force. In January 2007, it was operated by No. 303 Signals Unit and was visited by Princess Anne and her husband, Rear Admiral Timothy Laurence. In 2012, it was estimated that the radar site had a coverage of 108 kilometres (67 mi) up to an altitude of 494 metres (1,621 ft). During the Falklands Conflict, the site was used by Argentine forces to site an Eltar radar which was used to track Sea Harriers.

The accommodation and working areas of the base were completely rebuilt between 2016 and 2025, having previously been made up of containers which had been there since 1984. The teams building the new blocks had to have everything shipped out from the UK and were working in 80 miles per hour (130 km/h) winds. Byron Heights is also the location of a civilian band 300-Watt FM radio transmitter.

On 5 January 1984, a Lynx helicopter crashed into the sea just north of Byron Heights, both crewmembers were found still strapped inside the helicopter.
