= Mare Harbour =

Bay in the Falkland Islands

Coordinates: 51.8992°S 58.4559°W

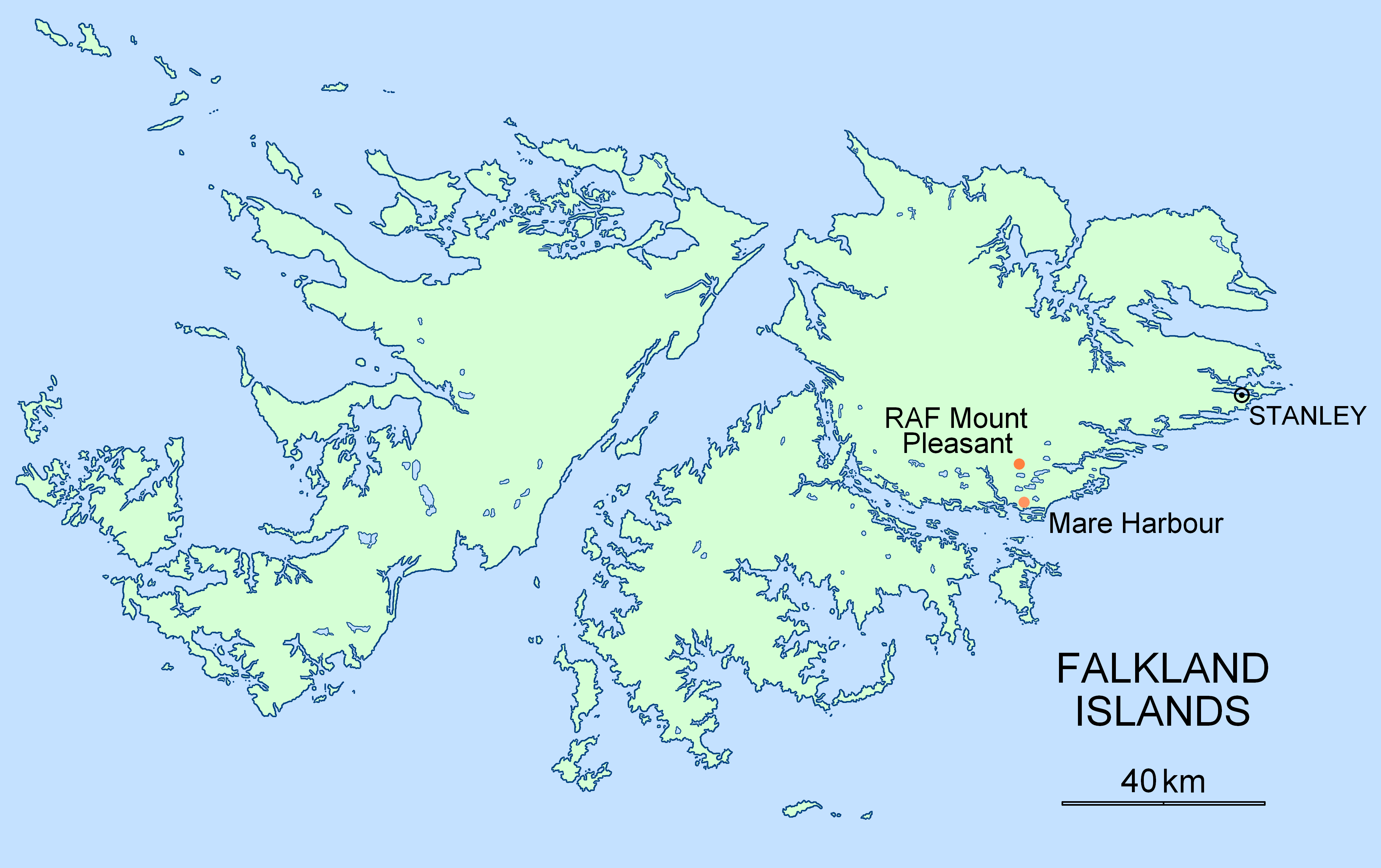
Location of Mare Harbour, Falkland Islands.

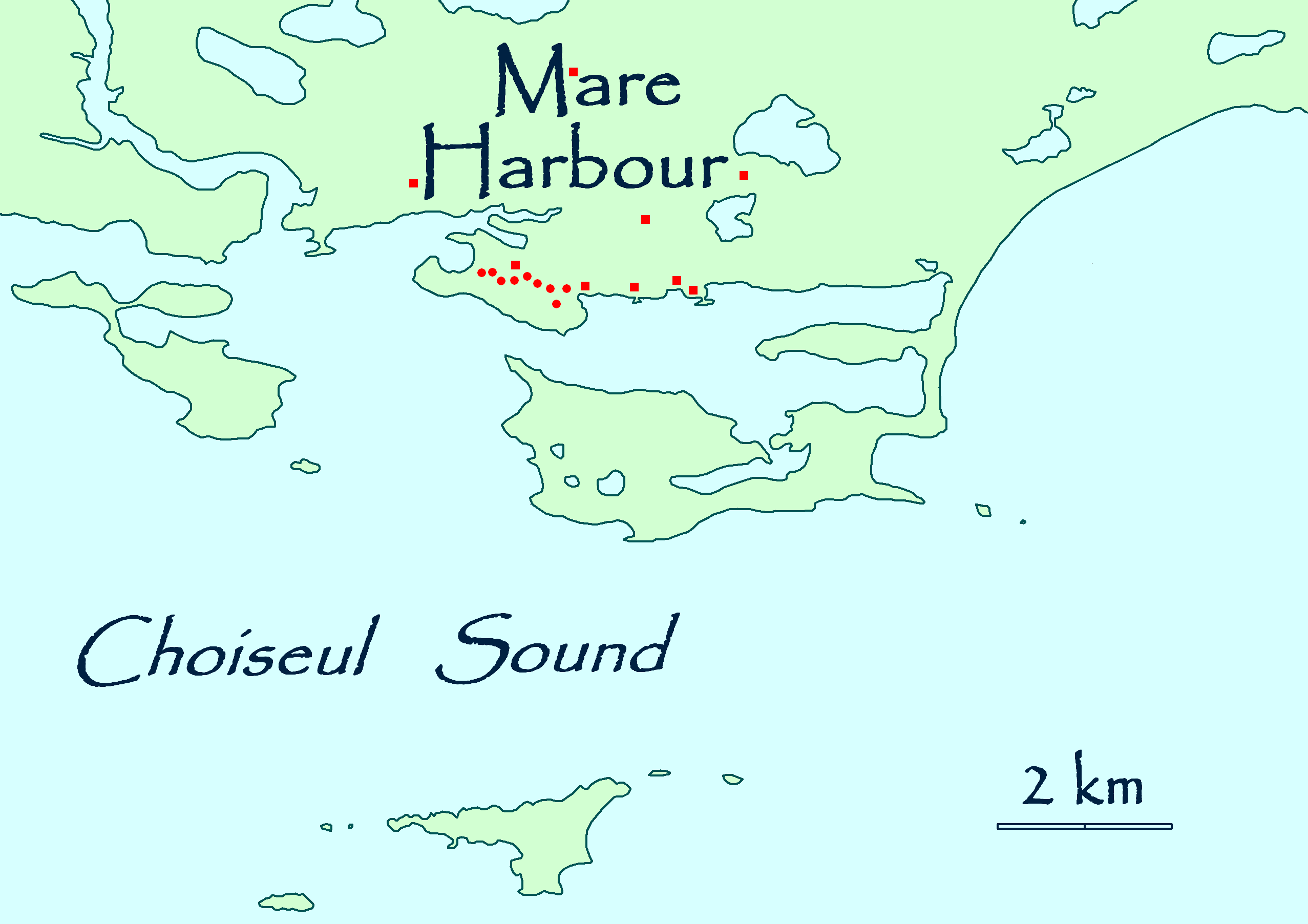
Map of the Mare Harbour naval facility.

Mare Harbour, known colloquially as East Cove Port, is a small settlement on East Falkland, on Choiseul Sound. It is mostly used as a port facility and depot for RAF Mount Pleasant, as well as a deepwater port used by the Royal Navy ships patrolling the South Atlantic and Antarctica, which means that the main harbour of the islands, Stanley Harbour, tends to deal with commercial transport.

During the 1982 Falklands War, Mare Harbour was considered as one of the potential sites for a British amphibious landing but the British landings took place on San Carlos Water in the west of East Falkland, on Falkland Sound. Mare Harbour was considered open to air attack.

In the latter 2010s, Mare Harbour berths were improved with a £22 million investment. The improvements enhanced the roll-on/roll-off jetty, used by the Ministry of Defence's Point-class sealift ships which call about once every six to eight weeks, and upgraded other facilities at Mare Harbour, including fire-fighting services.

The facilities now incorporate several berths including: the main jetty, roro jetty, west jetty (principally used to berth the Royal Navy's Falkland Islands patrol vessel HMS Medway) and the main jetty (inner) (used to berth a multi-purpose barge (MP3002) and two harbour tugs (Giesenstroom and Dintelstroom), from the contracted Netherlands Marine Services company Van Wijngaarden). In April 2024, Giesenstroom was tasked to assist the Panamanian-flagged reefer, MV Frio Chikumo, after the ship ran aground off the Falkland Islands.

The British Antarctic Survey ship, RRS Sir David Attenborough and the Royal Navy's ice patrol ship, HMS Protector, have used the port during the regional summer while the Falklands Government Fisheries Patrol Vessel, FPV Lilibet, may also call at the port periodically for fueling. Troops from the Royal Logistic Corps (460 (Port) Troop) provide cargo handling services at the port.

A daily bus service runs between Mare Harbour and Mount Pleasant.

== See also ==
- Military of the Falkland Islands
- RAF Mount Pleasant
