= HMS Medway (P223) =

2019 River-class offshore patrol vessel of the Royal Navy

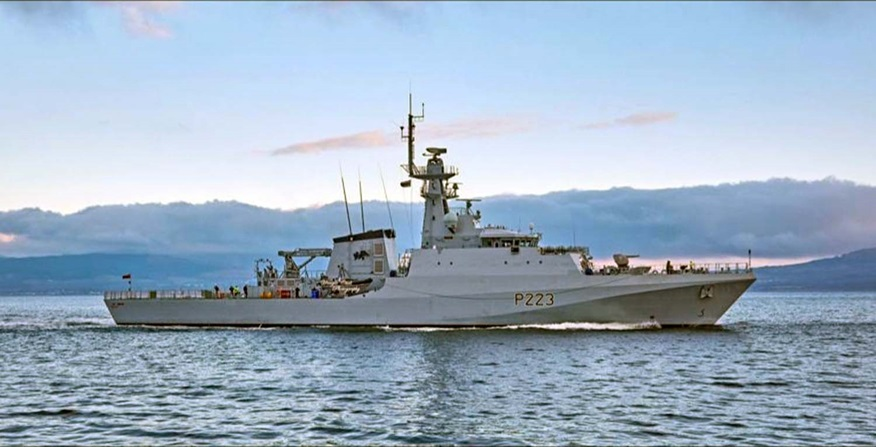
- HMS Medway on sea trials in 2018

History

United Kingdom
- Name: Medway
- Ordered: August 2014
- Builder: BAE Systems Naval Ships
- Laid down: 8 June 2015 (Steel cut)
- Launched: 23 August 2017
- Sponsored by: Wendy Fallon
- Christened: 20 October 2017
- Commissioned: 19 September 2019
- Home port: HMNB Portsmouth
- Identification: Pennant number: P223; IMO number: 9752060
- Status: In service
- Badge

General characteristics
- Class & type: Batch 2 River-class patrol vessel
- Displacement: 2,000 tonnes
- Length: 90.5 m (296 ft 11 in)
- Beam: 13 m (42 ft 8 in)
- Draught: 3.8 m (12 ft 6 in)
- Speed: 25 knots (46 km/h; 29 mph)
- Range: 5,500 nmi (10,200 km; 6,300 mi)
- Endurance: 35 days
- Boats & landing craft carried: 2 × rigid-hulled inflatable boats
- Troops: up to 50
- Crew: 34–50
- Sensors & processing systems: Kelvin Hughes Ltd SharpEye navigation radar; Terma Scanter 4100 2D radar; BAE CMS-1; Shared Infrastructure operating system
- Armament: 1 × 30 mm DS30B gun; 2 × general purpose machine guns; 2 × miniguns (replaced by Browning .50 caliber heavy machine guns as of 2023)
- Aviation facilities: Merlin-capable flight deck

HMS Medway is a Batch 2 River-class offshore patrol vessel for the Royal Navy. Named after the River Medway in Kent, she was the second Batch 2 River-class vessel to be commissioned. She has been assigned long-term as a Royal Navy guardship in the Caribbean, but as of October 2026, is stationed as a guardship in the Falkland Islands.

== Construction ==
On 6 November 2013, it was announced that the Royal Navy had signed an agreement in principle to build three new offshore patrol vessels based on the River-class design (more specifically, the larger Amazonas-class corvette derivative) at a fixed price of £348 million, including spares and support. In August 2014, BAE Systems signed a contract to build the ships on the River Clyde. The ships, which were designated Batch 2 of the River class, were to be globally-deployable and capable of carrying out constabulary tasks, such as counter-terrorism, counter-piracy and anti-smuggling. As the second ship of the new batch, Medway included some 29 modifications and enhancements over the baseline Amazonas design.

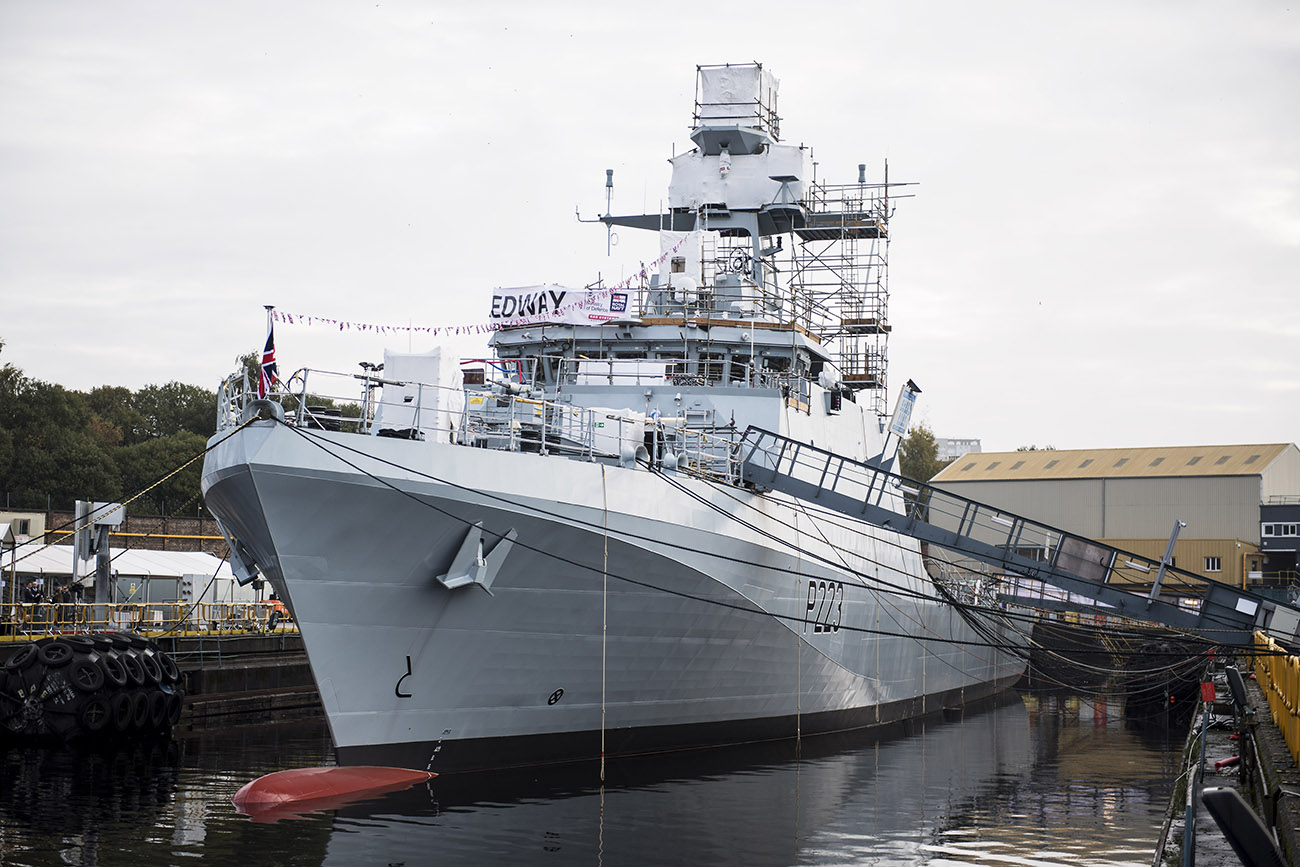
Medway before her sea trials

Steel was cut, marking the start of construction of Medway, on 8 June 2015 at BAE Systems Govan shipyard in Glasgow. Rather than being launched in the traditional manner, Medway was rolled onto a semi-submersible barge and lowered into the water on 23 August 2017 and was officially named a few weeks later on 20 October 2017. Builder's sea trials began on 9 November 2018 and were completed by 11 December 2018. Her sea trials were completed in only 75 days, a record not seen since World War II. She was then transferred to the Royal Navy on 5 March 2019.

== Operational history ==
Medway was commissioned into the Royal Navy on 19 September 2019. Arriving via her namesake river, her commissioning ceremony took place at the former Royal Navy Chatham Dockyard in Kent with her sponsor, Lady Fallon, the wife of former Defence Secretary Sir Michael Fallon in attendance. In the following month, her first operational tasking saw her escorting a Russian Navy cruiser through the English Channel.

=== Caribbean ===
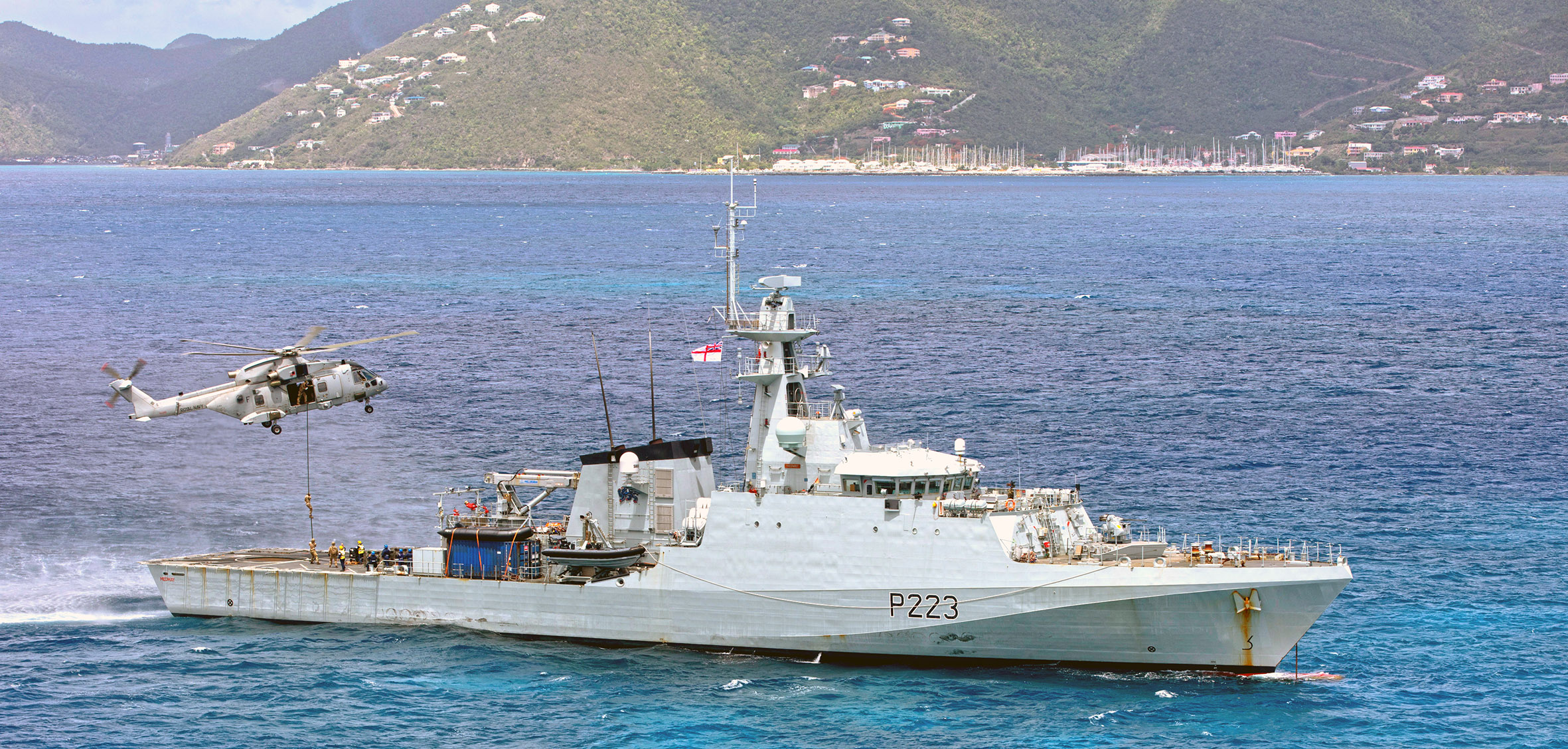
Medway conducting an exercise with a Merlin HC4 from 845 Naval Air Squadron off the coast of Curaçao

In January 2020, Medway embarked on her first overseas deployment, assigned to Atlantic Patrol Task (North) on long-term guardship duties in the Caribbean. She made a stop for final supplies and fuel in Gibraltar in what was her first visit to the territory. After arriving in the Caribbean, Medway joined Royal Fleet Auxiliary support ship RFA Argus to form a task group, offering nearby British Overseas Territories a range of support from disaster relief during the hurricane season to tackling all forms of illicit trafficking. The deployment also coincided with the COVID-19 pandemic and both ships were reported to be on standby to offer any support, if required. The Governor of the British Virgin Islands subsequently requested the assistance of Medway in securing the territory's borders in an effort to control the spread of the virus in late September. Mid-September also saw the involvement of Medway in a large counter-narcotics operation in conjunction with Argus, 47 Commando (Raiding Group) Royal Marines and the United States Coast Guard. The operation led to the seizure of cocaine with a UK street value of £81 million, according to the National Crime Agency.

In October 2022, Medway was involved in another drug seizure. She captured more than 400 kg (880 lb) of cocaine worth an estimated £24m. Three smugglers were detained and the vessel was destroyed. On 6 January 2023, Medway rescued five people from an ocean-going tug in strong winds near Sint Maarten after receiving an SOS message; the tug later sank.

=== Falklands deployment 2023 ===
In January 2023, Medway temporarily deployed to the Falkland Islands to take over the role of guardship there whilst HMS Forth underwent maintenance. In April, the patrol vessel was operating in the waters off South Georgia on sovereignty protection tasks. In May 2023, the destroyer HMS Dauntless temporarily replaced Medway on her normal Caribbean tasking.

In September, Medway conducted a search and rescue exercise with civilian-crewed helicopters from Bristow Helicopters operating in the Falkland Islands. The ship also exercised with soldiers from 2nd Battalion, the Rifles, comprising the roulement infantry company stationed in the islands.

=== 2023–2024 refit ===
In November, with the return of Forth to the South Atlantic, Medway began transit to Gibraltar for a maintenance period at the Gibraltar dockyard prior to resuming her patrol duties in the Caribbean. Given the departure of Dauntless from the Caribbean, she was temporarily replaced as Caribbean guardship by her sister ship, HMS Trent. In the later half of April 2024 nearing the end of the refit and maintenance Medway was seen with a new dazzle camouflage paint scheme similar to HMS Tamar and HMS Spey. In June 2024, during post-refit sea trials off Gibraltar, the ship was reported to have run into mechanical problems and had to be towed back to the port for further work. Purusant to repairs, sea trials were resumed in July 2024. The ship was reported to have returned to Portsmouth in August 2024 in preparation for her return to her Caribbean station.

=== Return to the Caribbean 2024/25 ===
In September 2024, HMS Medway returned to the Caribbean, stopping in the Azores to return six rare turtles to their original habitat after they had washed up on UK shores. The patrol vessel arrived in Bermuda in early October.

In late November 2024, HMS Medway visited the Turks and Caicos Islands to conduct a disaster response exercise, tours for local youth clubs and hosted the Governor of the Islands onboard. In March 2025, the patrol vessel began a three-month maintenance period in Tampa, Florida returning to sea in June 2025. In October 2025, HMS Medway was relieved by HMS Trent on the Caribbean tasking but nevertheless remained in the vicinity of the Bahamas to provide possible assistance in the aftermath of Hurricane Melissa.The ship is now under the command of Lieutenant Commander Lucia Ramsay, RN. As of December 2025, HMS Medway was reported transiting south to the Falkland Islands, visiting Brazil in the process.

=== Falklands deployment 2026 ===
In January 2026, HMS Medway officially deployed to the Falkland Islands, taking over from HMS Forth as the permanent Royal Navy patrol vessel in the South Atlantic. Shifting from her usual Caribbean deployment, her mission includes fisheries protection, joint military exercises, and delivering medical aid and supplies to remote outposts.

In April 2026, the vessel successfully navigated icy, low-visibility waters to transport paratroopers from 16 Air Assault Brigade to South Georgia for sovereignty patrols and explosive ordnance disposal (EOD).

HMS Medway was dispatched from her post in the Falkland Islands on 14 May 2026 and sailed for seven days through notoriously rough waters to reach Tristan da Cunha. HMS Medway arrived off the coast on 22 May 2026. Her primary objectives are to deliver six fresh civilian clinicians and heavy medical provisions to manage a potential Hantavirus case on the island and extract paratroopers and military medics to the Falklands who parachuted onto the island for two weeks previously. Four of the arriving medics were from the UK and two from the Falkland Islands. On 24 May, sea conditions allowed them to get the civilian medics and one crew member off first, and then the military medics and paratroopers boarded the ship using a Tristan Fisheries RIB, although some of the paratroopers' kit remained on the island and will be shipped at a later date. HMS Medway then set sail for the Falklands.

In July 2026, HMS Medway visited the Chilean port of Punta Arenas eliciting protests from Argentina due to its use of the Strait of Magellan for routine passage. Argentina claimed this represented a failure to comply with the procedures established in the Madrid II Agreement signed in February 15, 1990 between the United Kingdom and Argentina which aimed to prevent military incidents in the area.Previously Chile prevented in 2022 the resupplying of HMS Medway's sister ship HMS Forth in Punta Arenas, a move that was seen as favourable to Argentine interests.
