= River Island, Falkland Islands =

River Island Isla del Rio
- Island
- River Island shown within the Falkland Islands
- Coordinates: 51°25′14″S 59°36′32″W
- Country: Falkland Islands
- Time zone: UTC−3 (FKST)
- If shown, area and population ranks are for all islands and all inhabited islands in the Falklands respectively.

River Island (Spanish: Isla del Rio) is one of the Falkland Islands. It is located in Byron Sound to the south of East Island and Pebble Island. There is a tidal island to its west, separated by a shallow lagoon.

Despite its name, River Island is actually a salt water island.
