= Narrow Island, Falkland Islands =

Narrow Island
- Island
- Narrow Island shown within the Falkland Islands
- Coordinates: 51.383°S 59.710°W
- Country: Falkland Islands
- Time zone: UTC−3 (FKST)
- If shown, area and population ranks are for all islands and all inhabited islands in the Falklands respectively.

Narrow Island is one of the Falkland Islands, in Byron Sound. It is between Golding Island and Middle Island, and to the west of East Island. As its name implies, it is slender, and extends for several miles east–west, while only being about 200 metres (660 ft) in width at is widest point.
