= Passage Island, Falkland Islands =

Passage Island
- Island
- Passage Island shown within the Falkland Islands
- Coordinates: 51°22′15″S 59°50′50″W
- Country: Falkland Islands
- Time zone: UTC−3 (FKST)
- If shown, area and population ranks are for all islands and all inhabited islands in the Falklands respectively.

Passage Island is one of Falkland Islands, in Byron Sound, to the north of West Falkland. It is not to be confused with the Passage Islands which are to the west of West Falkland. It is to the west of Golding Island.
