= Keppel Island =

- Island
- Keppel Island shown within the Falkland Islands
- Coordinates: 51°19′15″S 59°58′07″W
- Country: Falkland Islands

Area
  - Total: 36.26 km^{2} (14.00 sq mi)
- Highest elevation: 341 m (1,119 ft)

Population (2001)
  - Total: 0
  - Density: 0.0/km^{2} (0.0/sq mi)
- Time zone: UTC−3 (FKST)
- If shown, area and population ranks are for all islands and all inhabited islands in the Falklands respectively.

Keppel Island (Spanish: Isla Vigía) is one of the Falkland Islands, lying between Saunders and Pebble islands, and near Golding Island to the north of West Falkland on Keppel Sound. It has an area of 3,626 hectares (8,960 acres) and its highest point, Mt. Keppel, is 341 metres (1,119 ft) high. There is a wide, flat valley in the centre of the island with several freshwater lakes. The central valley rises steeply to the south-west, west and north. The north-east is low-lying, with a deeply indented coastline.

The large population of Norway rats on the island constitute an invasive species. They are predators of birds that nest there, of which several species are of conservation interest.

== History ==
Early British settlers named the island after Admiral Augustus Keppel, First Lord of the Admiralty in the 18th century.

An Anglican missionary settlement set up in the mid-19th century served some Yaghan people brought there from Tierra del Fuego. They taught them farming and English, and some of the British party learned Yamana (or Yahgan). In 1885, the island was developed by European immigrants for sheep farming.

In the late 20th century, the island was designated as a nature reserve. It has a small settlement on the east coast, but no permanent population.

=== Missionary station ===
The mission on Keppel Island was established in 1855 by the South American Missionary Society (then the Patagonian Mission Society), initially under Captain William Parker Snow. It operated until 1898. Captain Allen Gardiner, founder of the society, had proposed use of this island, as a less hostile climate and environment than Tierra del Fuego, from which missionaries could gain the confidence of the Yaghan and learn their language.

Anglican Mission station of the South America Mission Society on Keppel Island, West Falklands at some time shortly before or during 1867.

== In Patagonia ==
From 1856, Anglican missionaries persuaded several Yaghan to move from Tierra del Fuego to Keppel Island, where they learnt farming techniques and some English. The Yahgan did not go to Keppel Island until a few years after the British built "Cranmer Station" near Committee Bay, named for Thomas Cranmer, the Protestant martyr. One of the more notable visitors to Cranmer Station (in 1860) was Jemmy Button, a Yahgan who had learnt English and was taken to England as a visitor with two other Yahgans aboard HMS Beagle in 1830–31, on its first return trip.

After some setbacks, the mission succeeded in 1869 in founding another mission on Tierra del Fuego, at Ushuaia near the Beagle Canal, under the leadership of Waite Stirling, who later became a bishop in the region. Thomas Bridges was a young Anglican missionary who started there in 1871, having already learned the Yahgan language while on Keppel Island. He became fluent, and over a decade, wrote a Yámana grammar and dictionary containing 30,000 words. It was considered valuable for ethnological study of the people.

Today, the mission bailiff's house, the chapel, and the stone walls of some of the Yaghan dwellings remain intact on Keppel Island. Some stone walls have been used to provide foundations for present-day buildings. The ruins are listed buildings and represent amongst the oldest in the islands.

== Important bird area ==
Keppel Island has been identified by BirdLife International as an Important Bird Area (IBA). Birds for which the site is of conservation significance include Falkland steamer ducks, ruddy-headed geese, gentoo penguins (1250 breeding pairs) southern rockhopper penguins (780 pairs), Magellanic penguins, black-browed albatrosses (1800 pairs) and white-bridled finches.

Birds of Keppel Island
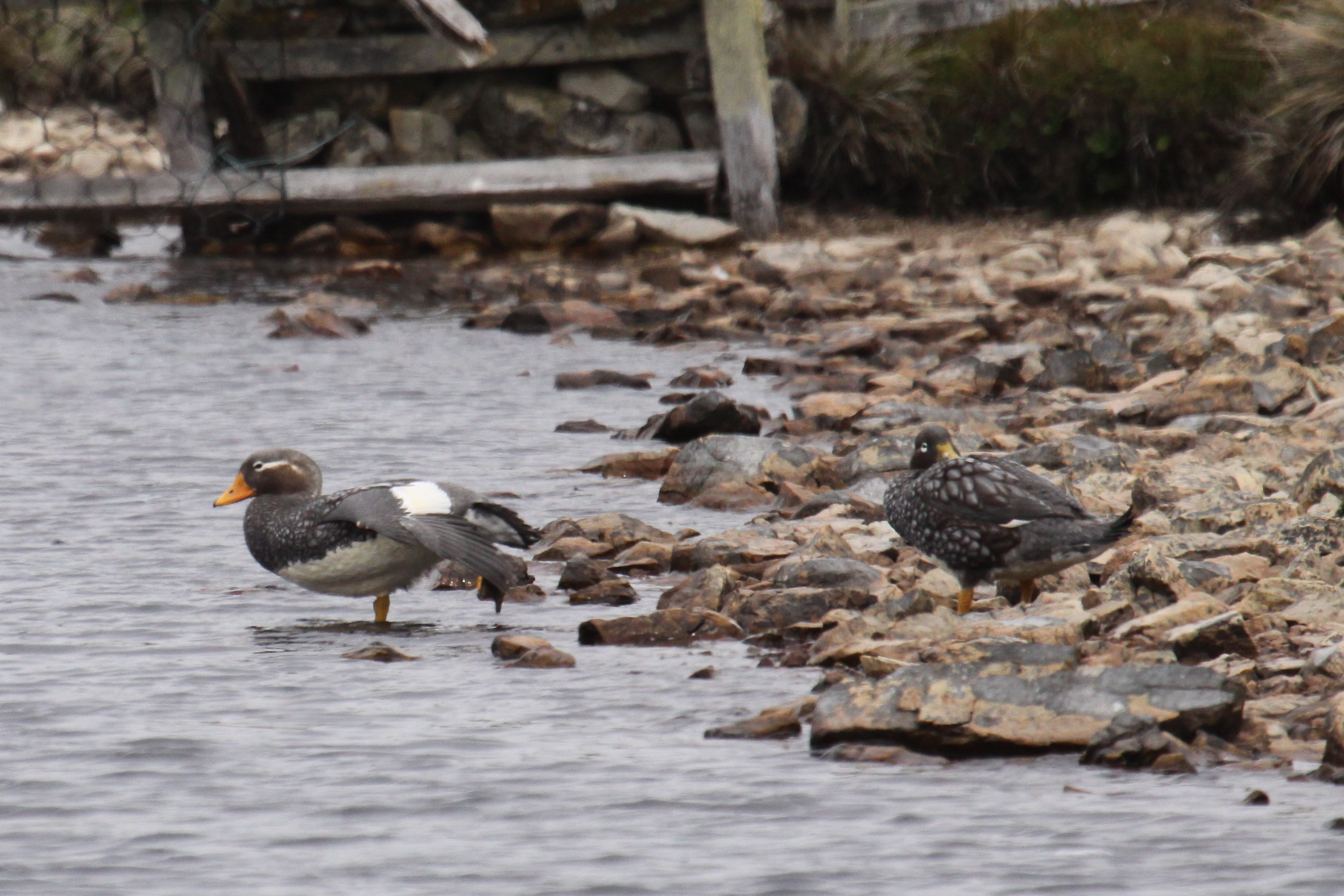
Falkland steamer duck

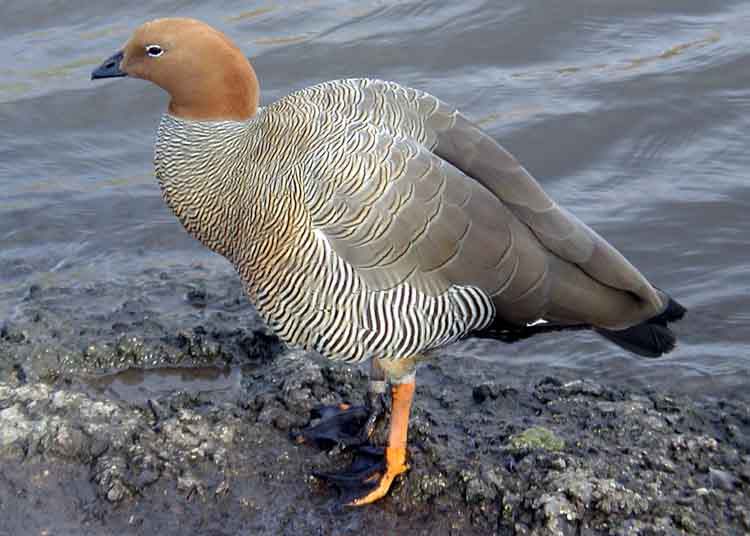
Ruddy-headed goose

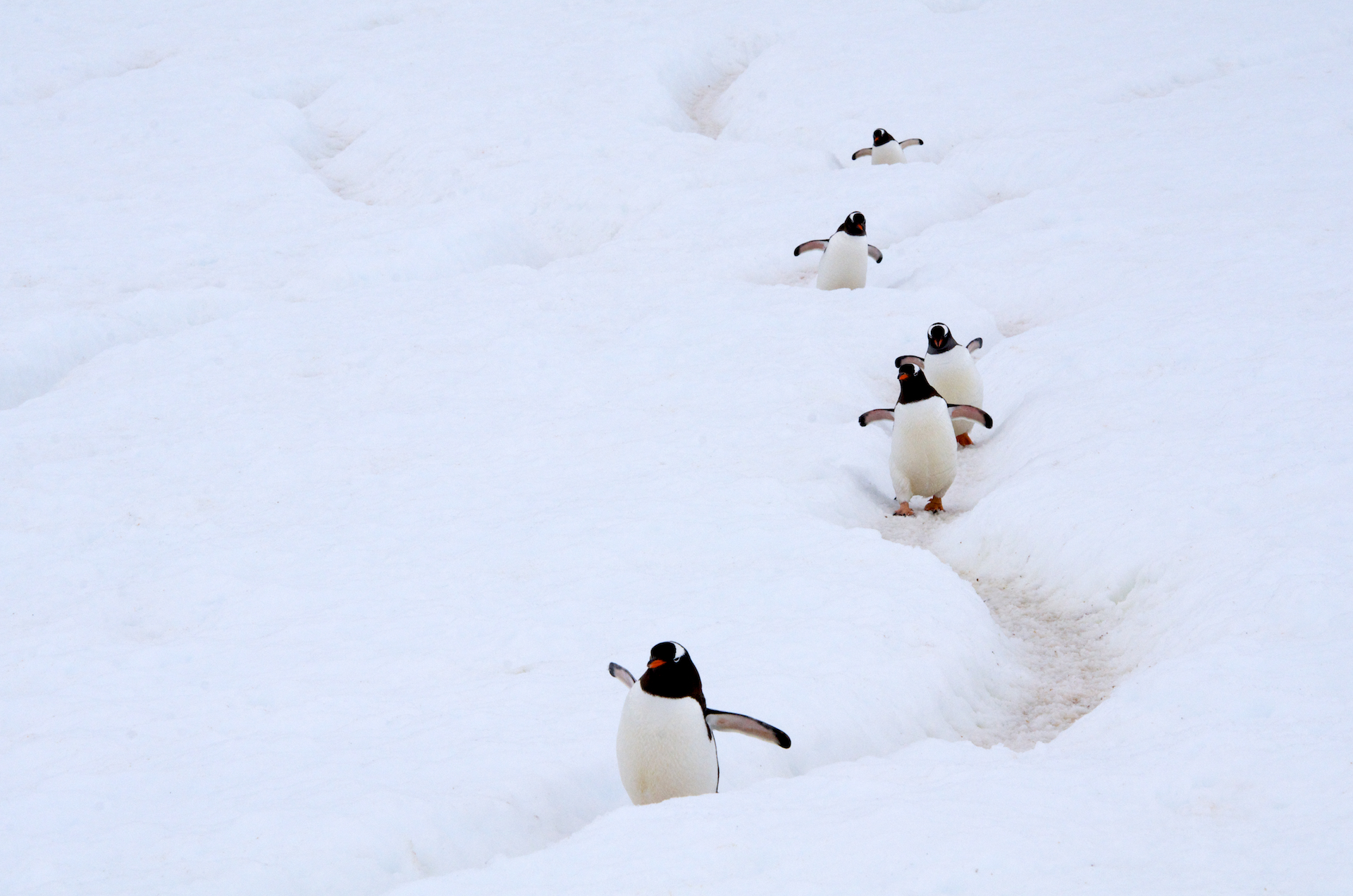
Gentoo penguin

Southern rockhopper penguin

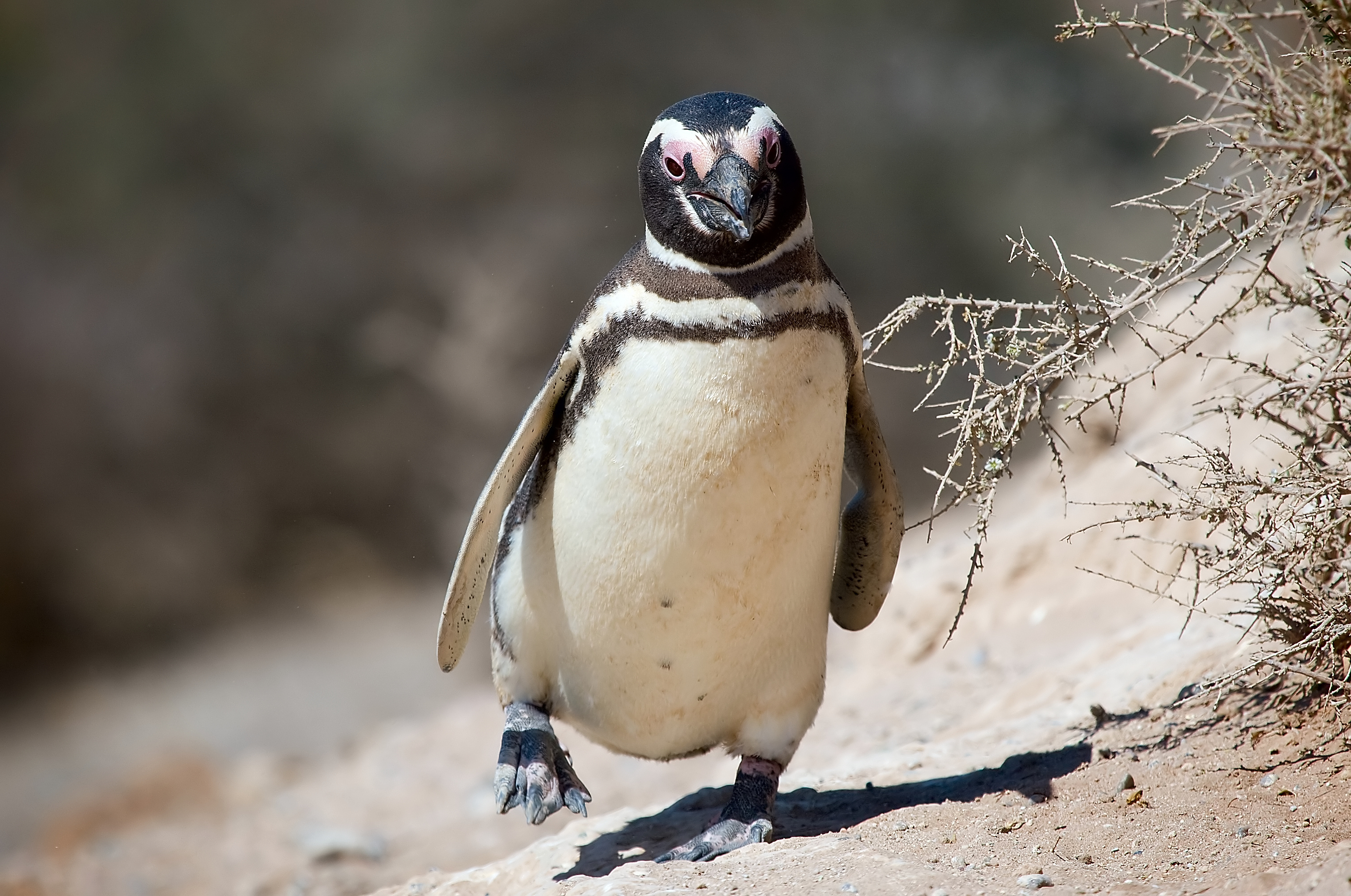
Magellanic penguin

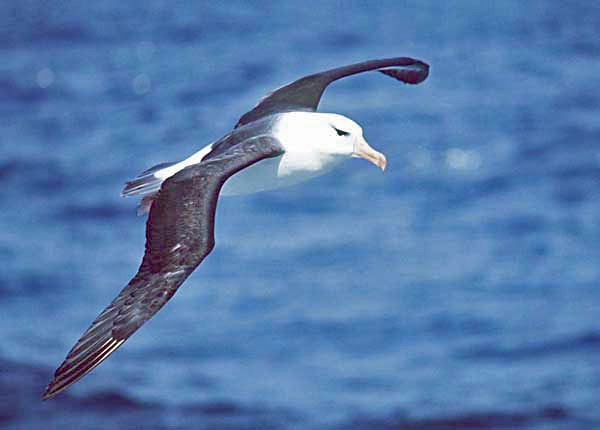
Black-browed albatross

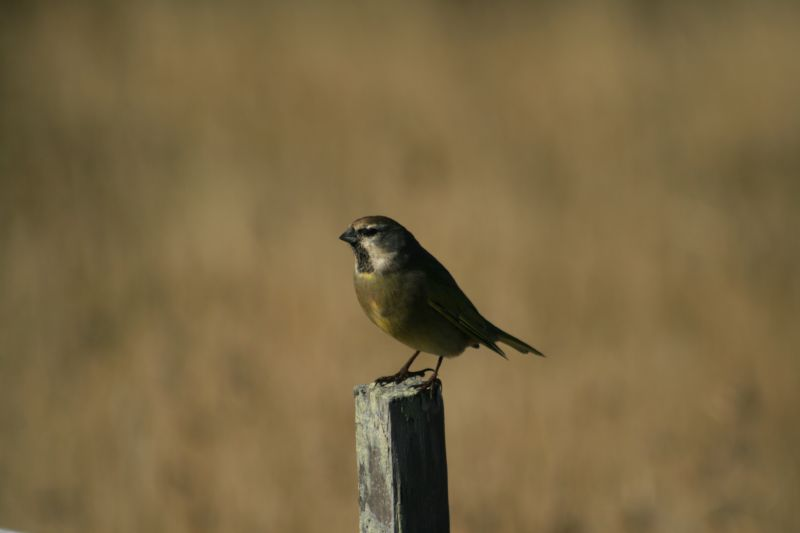
Canary-winged finch

== See also ==
- Thomas Bridges
