= New Island =

- Island
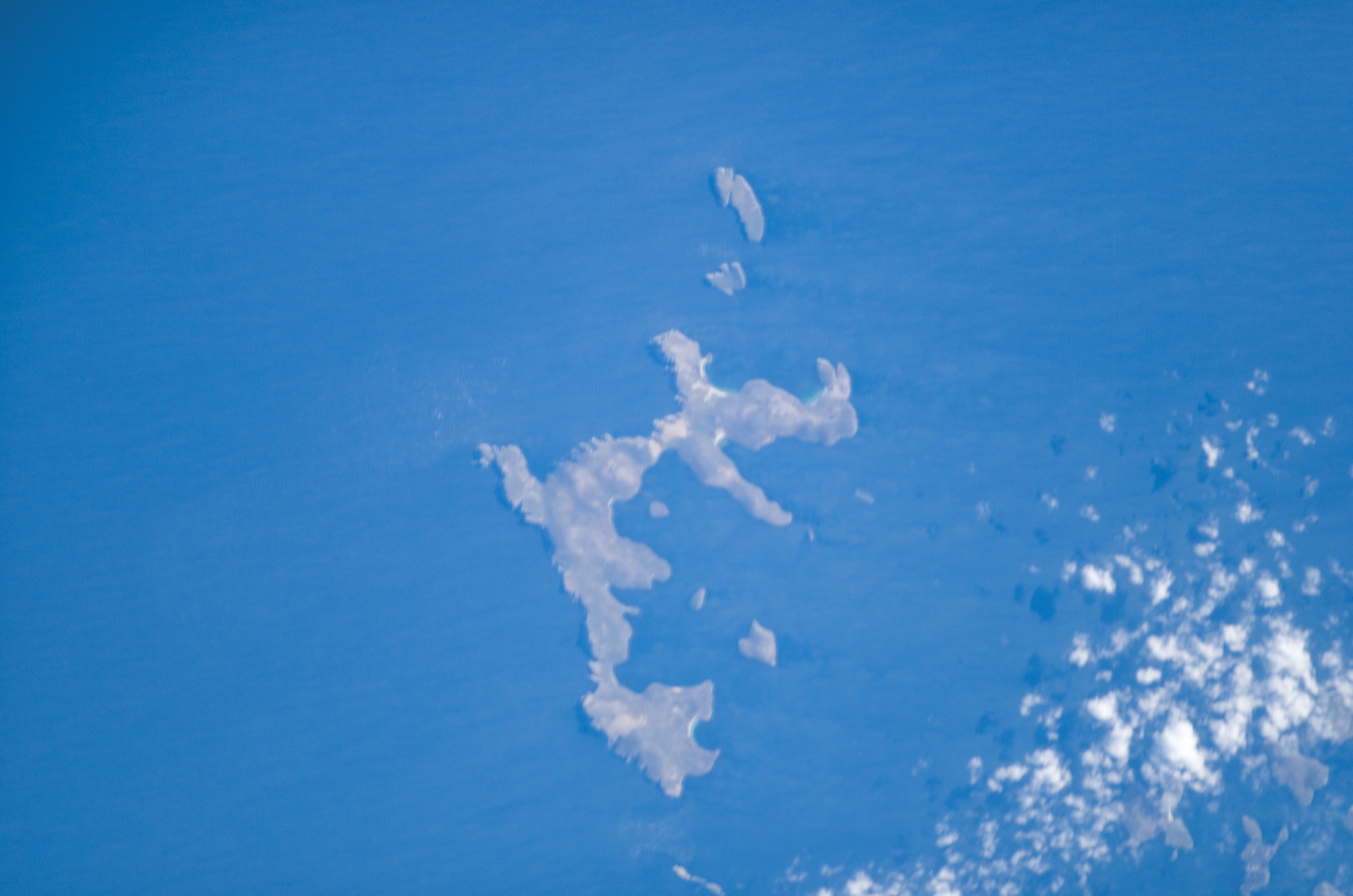

- New Island shown within the Falkland Islands
- Coordinates: 51°43′18″S 61°18′01″W
- Country: Falkland Islands

Area
  - Total: 22.7 km^{2} (8.8 sq mi)
- Highest elevation: 226 m (741 ft)
- Time zone: UTC−3 (FKST)
- If shown, area and population ranks are for all islands and all inhabited islands in the Falklands respectively.

New Island (Spanish: Isla de Goicoechea) is one of the Falkland Islands, lying north of Beaver Island. It is 238 km (148 mi) from Stanley and is 13 km (8.1 mi) long with an average width of 750 m (820 yd). The highest point is 226 metres (741 ft). The northern and eastern coasts have high cliffs but the eastern coasts are lower lying, with rocky shores and sandy bays. There are several smaller offshore islands in the group; North Island and Saddle Island have high cliffs but Ship Island and Cliff Knob Island are lower lying.

Long used as a base for whaling, as a sheep farm and for occasional attempts to collect guano, New Island is considered by some to be one of the most beautiful islands in the Falklands archipelago, as well as having possibly the most diverse range of wildlife in the region. It is a nature reserve, established by Ian Strange in 1972.

A settlement lies in the middle of the east coast of the island, some distance north of an airstrip.

== History ==
New Island was one of the earliest of the Falkland Islands to be colonised, and American whalers may have arrived as early as the 1770s. Two place names on or near the island, Coffin's Harbour and Coffin's Island, commemorate the Coffin family of Nantucket. Nearby Quaker, Barclay, Fox and Penn islands reflect the New England and Quaker provenance of some of the earliest settlers.

In 1813, Captain Charles H. Barnard, from Nantucket, was marooned with his crew on the island. They survived on the island for two years, and constructed a crude stone building, which is probably incorporated into the Barnard Building, the oldest standing building in the Falklands and now a museum restored in 2006. In December 1814 HMS Indispensable, William Buckle, master, and Asp, John Kenny, master, rescued them.

In 1823, Antarctic explorer Captain James Weddell anchored at the island, and commented on its excellent harbours and its natural food and water supplies. In the 1850s and 60s, the island's guano deposits were mined.

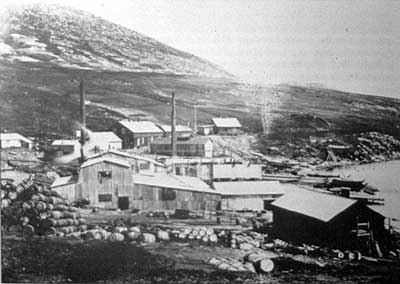
New Whaling Company's whaling station on New Island, operated from 1908 to 1916.

The Norwegian whaling company Ørnen, controlled by Christen Christensen of Sandefjord, sent the first modern floating whaling factory, Admiralen, to New Island in 1905. The vessel arrived on 24 December, but during one month of operation only 40 whales (24 fin, 12 sei, 3 sperm, and 1 humpback) were caught. Admiralen proceeded to Admiralty Bay in the South Shetland Islands to look for blue and right whales, thus becoming the first floating factory to operate in the Antarctic.

From 1908, the Scottish company Christian Salvesen operated a land based whaling station under the name New Whaling Company. A transport vessel and a whale catcher arrived on 22 December and brought a decommissioned land station from Fáskrúðsfjörður in Iceland. The first whale was caught on 16 January 1909, with 226 whales (215 sei) being caught the first season. Results were unsatisfactory though, with the station last operating in 1915. Of the reported catch, over 900 were sei whales (about two-thirds of the total). Remains of the station is still visible.

The island holds the shipwreck of a sealing vessel, the Protector III, which beached in 1969. Protector III was built in 1942, and was one of 12 minesweepers constructed for the Royal Navy by the Wagstaff Hatfield Shipyard in Port Greville, Nova Scotia. The vessel served the navy until the end of World War 2, when it was sold to Italy in 1946. The Italians then sold it to sealers in 1955, who took the Protector III to the Falklands.

== Ownership ==
From 1996 to 2020 the island was owned and run by The New Island Conservation Trust which acquired the freehold of the entire property in 2005. The Trust was managed by a Board of Trustees under the Chairmanship of Air Vice-Marshal David Crwys-Williams CB, a former Commander of the British Forces, Falkland Islands, in the 1980s. The major benefactor to the Trust has been the Geoffrey C Hughes Charitable Trust which not only made the purchase possible, but also funded the well-equipped Field Centre used as a base for teams of wildlife researchers from many different countries. In 2020 the Trust merged with Falklands Conservation, and the combined organisation now oversees and manages New Island for conservation and as a tourist destination.

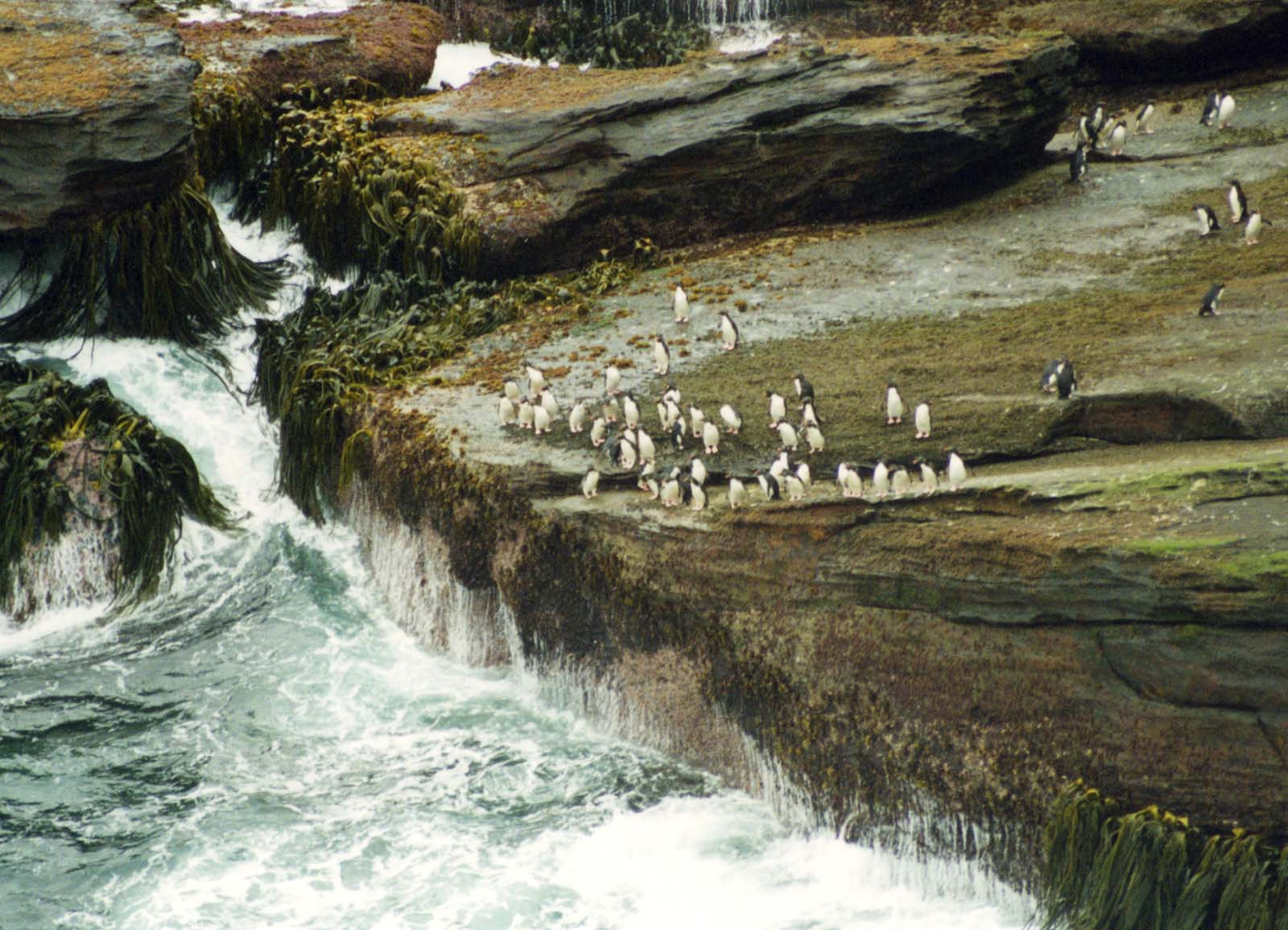
Eudyptes chrysocome on New Island.

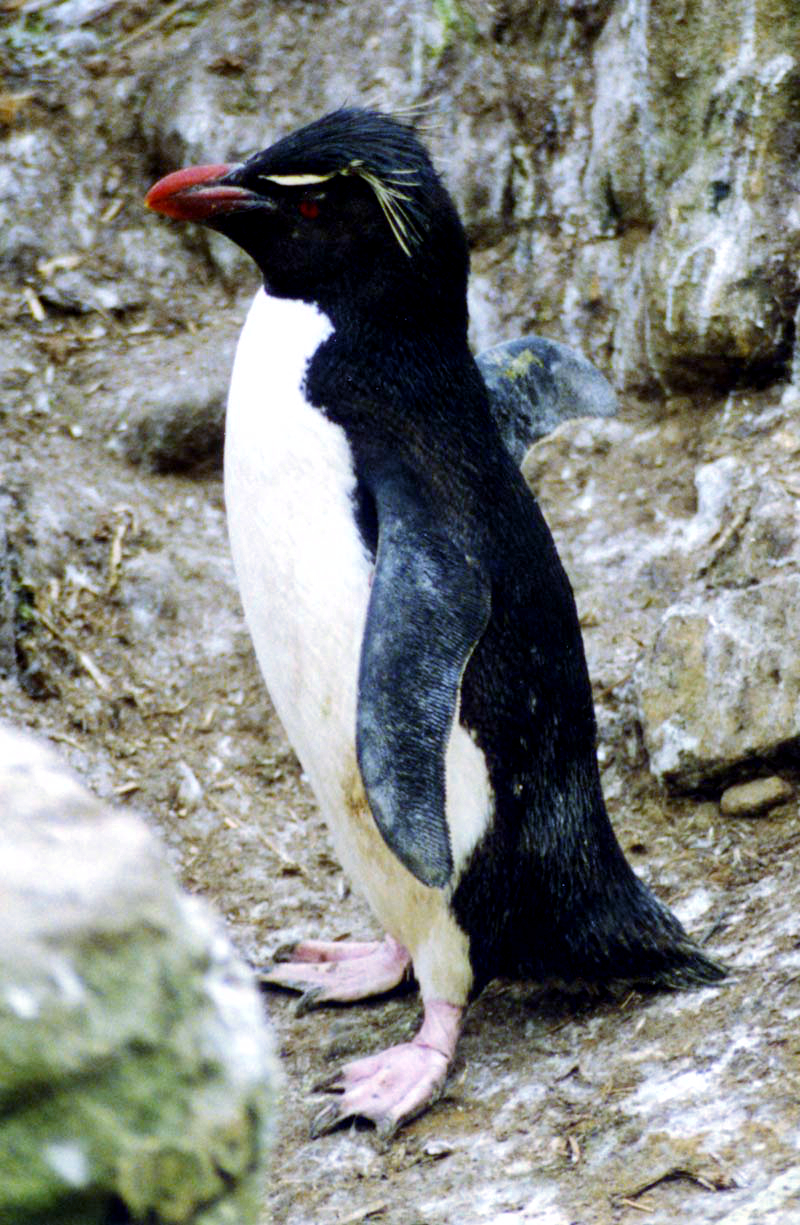
Adult rockhopper in a New Island rookery.

== Wildlife ==
The island is largely vegetated with grasses; there are no native trees, though shrubs have been introduced. Wildlife includes South American fur seals and southern sea lions. There are no native land mammals though the island contains a population of introduced cottontail rabbits (Sylvilagus sp.). Resident pods of Peale's dolphins frequent the bays of New Island and Southern Elephant seals are occasionally found here but do not breed.

=== Birds ===
The New Island group has been identified by BirdLife International as an Important Bird Area (IBA). Birds for which the site is of conservation significance include Falkland steamer ducks, ruddy-headed geese, gentoo penguins (ca. 6600 breeding pairs), southern rockhopper penguins (ca. 13,000 pairs), Magellanic penguins, black-browed albatrosses (ca. 29,000 pairs), thin-billed prions, white-chinned petrels, imperial shags, striated caracaras, white-bridled finches, blackish cinclodes and Cobb's wrens. It is also home to dolphin gulls, Falkland skuas, upland geese and long-tailed meadowlarks amongst other species.
