= East Island, Falkland Islands =

East Island
- Island
- East Island shown within the Falkland Islands
- Coordinates: 51.375°S 59.640°W
- Country: Falkland Islands
- Time zone: UTC−3 (FKST)
- If shown, area and population ranks are for all islands and all inhabited islands in the Falklands respectively.

East Island is one of the Falkland Islands off Pebble Island and Broken Island in Byron Sound.
