= Broken Island, Falkland Islands =

Broken Island
- Island
- Broken Island shown within the Falkland Islands
- Coordinates: 51.344°S 59.673°W
- Country: Falkland Islands
- Time zone: UTC−3 (FKST)
- If shown, area and population ranks are for all islands and all inhabited islands in the Falklands respectively.

Broken Island is one of the Falkland Islands, in Byron Sound, due north of West Falkland.

== Geography and geology ==
The island gains its name from its terrain which contains many bays, and inlets. It has a central portion in a circular shape, with one spit extending to the west, and another to the east, in twisted fashion. It is shaped like and S on its side.

There are a number of small islets off it.

It is due south of Pebble Island and east of Golding Island.

== Falklands War ==
During the Falklands War, the Argentine Navy bombed the island on the same day that the Sir Galahad was targeted and destroyed. David Brown comments that the island seemed and unlikely location to be targeted, and postulates that perhaps the attacking forces thought some British forces may be present there.
