= Sandy Bay Island =

- Island
- Sandy Bay Island shown within the Falkland Islands
- Coordinates: 52°11′39″S 58°48′09″W
- Country: Falkland Islands
- Elevation: 1 m (3.3 ft)
- Time zone: UTC−3 (FKST)

Sandy Bay Island (Spanish: Isla Bahía Arenosa) is a small, uninhabited island lying off the eastern coast of Bleaker Island in the Falkland Islands. It has a surface area of 0.32 square kilometres and a coastline of 2.4 kilometres. The island is situated at an average elevation of 1 metre above the sea level.
