= Tea Island =

- Island
- Location of Tea Island within the Falkland Islands
- Coordinates: 51.9°S 61.16667°W
- Country: Falkland Islands
- Time zone: UTC−3 (FKST)
- If shown, area and population ranks are for all islands and all inhabited islands in the Falklands respectively.

Tea Island is one of the Falkland Islands. It is beside Staats Island, and is just to the south west of Weddell Island. It is shaped like an upside down "h". It has some of the few examples of Felton's Flower, a rare endemic Falkland species.

It was also a site where the Patagonian fox was introduced in the early 1930s, along with other islands in the Weddell group, such as Staats and Beaver Island. In 2009, Tea Island became the first site of multispecies eradication of both Patagonian foxes and Norway rats, resulting in significant increases in bird populations.
