= Isla María =

Isla María may refer to:

- Islas Marías, an archipelago of four islands that belong to Mexico
- Bleaker Island, known as Isla Maria, Falkland Islands
