= Eddystone Rock, Falkland Islands =

Eddystone Rock
- Island
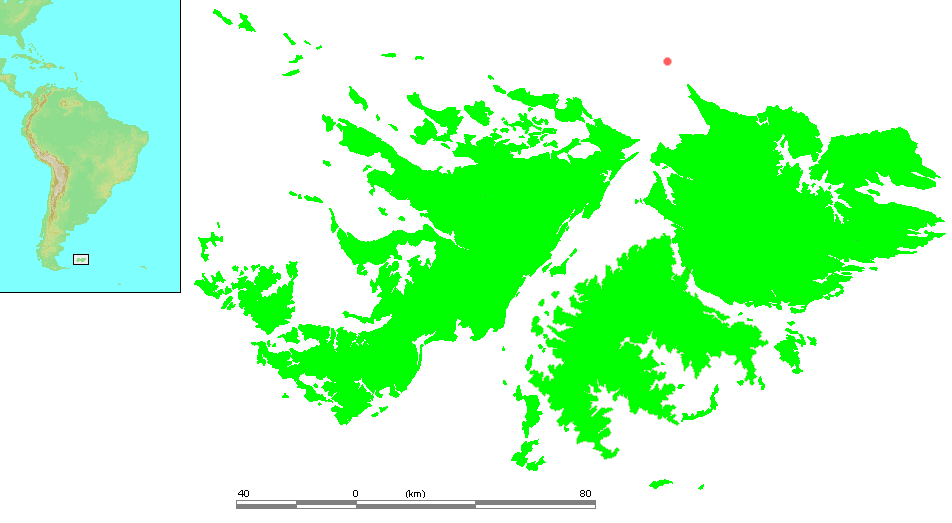
- Eddystone Rock within the Falkland Islands
- Coordinates: 51.11°S 59.03°W
- Country: Falkland Islands
- Named for: Spanish: Eddies Rock
- Highest elevation: 44 m (144 ft)

Population (2001)
  - Total: 0
- Time zone: UTC−3 (FKST)
- If shown, area and population ranks are for all islands and all inhabited islands in the Falklands respectively.

Eddystone Rock (Spanish: Roca Remolinos, meaning "Eddies Rock") is a rock and reef located to the north of Falkland Sound in the Falkland Islands. It is 44 m (144 ft) high. There is a lighthouse here, which is named after a more famous light of the same name in England.

== History ==
Some of the first people to sight the rock were the crew of Louis Antoine de Bougainville's ship, who named it the "Tower of Bissy".

Lieut. Lowcay during his 1837 survey of the Falkland Islands noted in his journal:

Sunday, 10 Dec...At 8 a.m. observed the Eddystone; this remarkable rock lies off the entrance of Falkland Sound and making it from the eastward it has the appearance of a round island, and from the westward it looks like a sail.
