= Centre Island, Falkland Islands =

Centre Island
- Island
- Centre Island shown within the Falkland Islands
- Coordinates: 51.4243°S 58.3105°W
- Country: Falkland Islands
- Time zone: UTC−3 (FKST)
- If shown, area and population ranks are for all islands and all inhabited islands in the Falklands respectively.

Centre Island (Spanish: Isla Centre) is a small island in Salvador Water, East Falkland, Falkland Islands.

It is a breeding place for seals, including elephant seals, and sea lions.
