= Sea Dog Island =

- Island
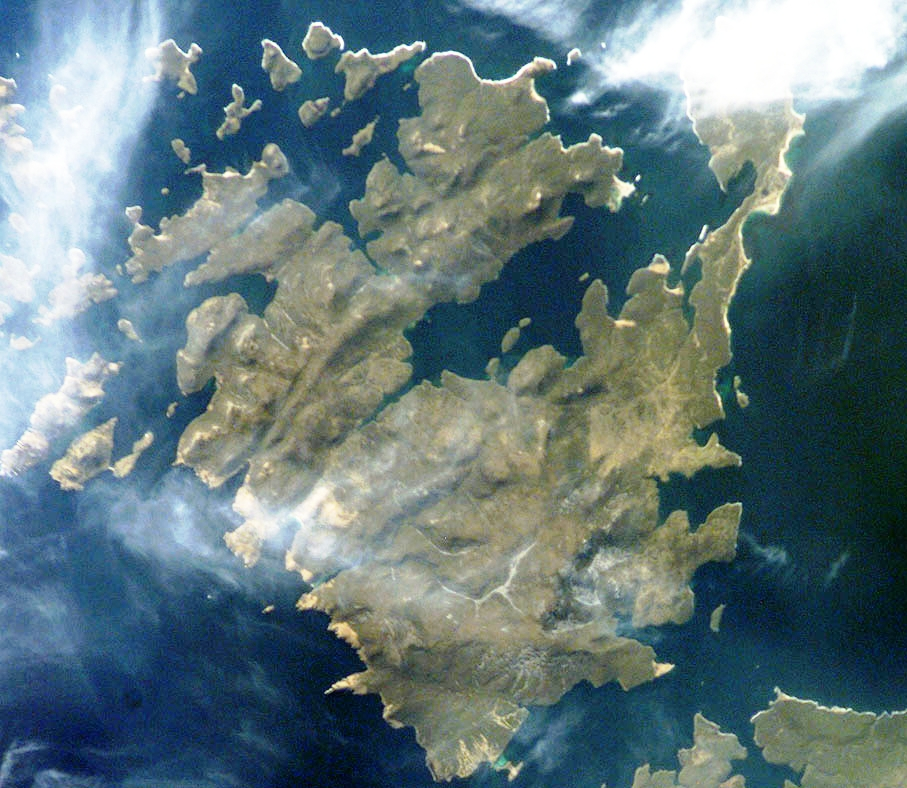
- Satellite image of Weddell Island

- Sea Dog Island shown within the Falkland Islands
- Coordinates: 52.004722°S 61.094722°W
- Country: Falkland Islands
- Time zone: UTC−3 (FKST)
- If shown, area and population ranks are for all islands and all inhabited islands in the Falklands respectively.

Sea Dog Island is an uninhabited island lying off West Falkland in the Falkland Islands. It lies west by south of Race Point on Weddell Island and northwest of Cape Orford on West Falkland. The island is a designated National Nature Reserve.

== Maps ==
- The Falkland Islands. Scale 1:401280 map. London: Edward Stanford, 1901
- Falkland Islands Explorer Map. Scale 1:365000. Ocean Explorer Maps, 2007
- Falklands Topographic Map Series. Scale 1:50000, 29 sheets. DOS 453, 1961-1979
- Falkland Islands. Scale 1:643000 Map. DOS 906. Edition 3-OS, 1998
