= Beaver Island, Falkland Islands =

Beaver Island
- Island
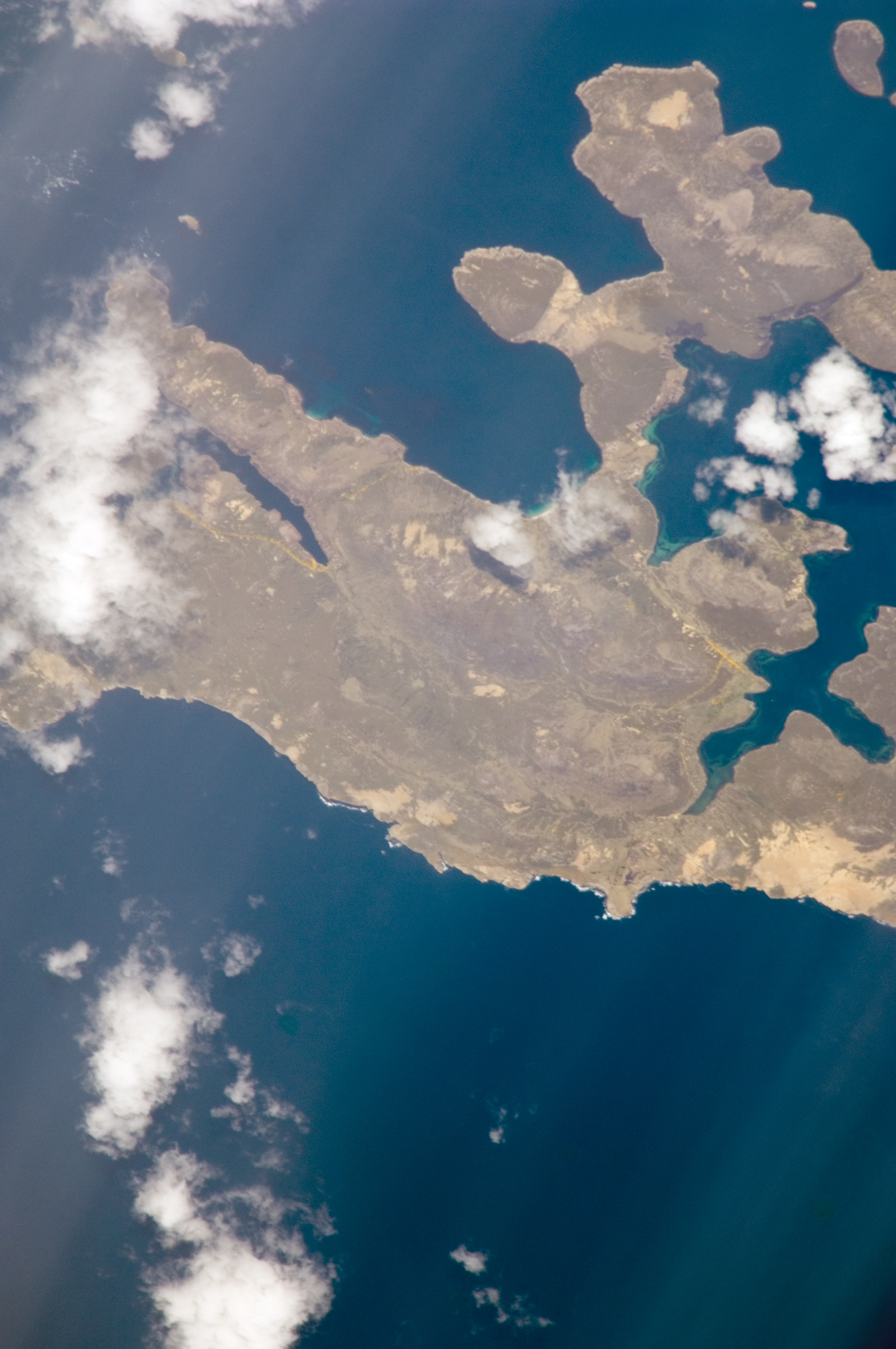

- Coordinates: 51°50′20″S 61°16′40″W
- Country: Falkland Islands
- Named for: English: from Beaver, a whaling ship

Area
  - Total: 48.56 km^{2} (18.75 sq mi)
- Time zone: UTC−3 (FKST)
- If shown, area and population ranks are for all islands and all inhabited islands in the Falklands respectively.

Beaver Island (Spanish: Isla San Rafael) is one of the Beaver Island group of Falkland Islands. It lies west of Weddell Island and south of New Island and has an area of 4,856 hectares (12,000 acres).

Other islands in the group include Staats Island, with an area of 500 hectares (1,200 acres); Tea Island, which covers 310 hectares (770 acres); Governor Island, which covers 220 hectares (540 acres); Split Island, with an area of 70 hectares (170 acres) and a few smaller islands. Though the smaller islands in the group are low-lying, the larger islands are very hilly, with many peaks of more than 150 metres (490 ft) and some more than 200 metres (660 ft). The highest elevation in the Beaver Island Group is 234 metres (768 ft).

== History and population ==
Beaver Island was named after the whaling vessel "Beaver" which was recorded as being the first whaling ship to double Cape Horn.

Beaver Settlement lies on the island, with an airstrip nearby. It is owned by Sally and Jerome Poncet.

== Wildlife ==
Wildlife on the island includes gentoo penguins, South American gray foxes (introduced, not to be confused with the Falkland Islands wolf), peregrine falcons, crested and striated caracaras, guanacos, fur seals, and many seabirds. Beds of kelp can be found offshore.

The Beaver Island Group has been identified by BirdLife International as an Important Bird Area. At least 40 species have been recorded, with 34 known to breed there. Species for which the group is an important breeding site include Falkland steamer ducks (245 pairs), gentoo penguins (2850 pairs), Magellanic penguins (2000 pairs), and southern giant petrels (300 pairs).
