= Ruggles Island =

Island of the Falkland Islands

- Island
- Interactive map of Ruggles Island
- Coordinates: 52°04′30″S 59°44′12″W
- Country: Falkland Islands
- Time zone: UTC−3 (FKST)
- If shown, area and population ranks are for all islands and all inhabited islands in the Falklands respectively.

Ruggles Island (Spanish: Isla Calista) is a small island, off East Falkland in the Falkland Islands. The island is contained within Falklands Sound, and to its east is Ruggles Bay, which forms the coast of Lafonia on East Falkland. It is just north of Speedwell Island, with Clump island to the north-west, and Flat Wolfe Island to the east.

The island, and Ruggles Bay, have shipwrecks; In September 1860, the US clipper Sea Ranger was lost off the island, and in September 1874, the Sangreal was lost in Ruggles Bay. In September 1885, the Italian ship Luigia sank here, with a hold full of marble statues. However, some of the cargo was saved and it was forwarded to Valparaiso for auction, with 50% of the proceeds going to the salvage crew.

In the late 19th-century, parties would travel to the island to shoot the wild cattle that were on the island. During the first half of the 1920s, the island was used to house 300 sheep in quarantine from the mainland of South America. By this time, the tenancy had lapsed and only 20 sheep were on the island. In 1988, the island, along with various others within Falkland Sound were sold by private bid by the Falkland Islands Corporation.

Flanagan Bay on the north shore of Ruggles Bay was named after a fallen British serviceman during the Falklands War. This was a project commissioned in 2022 as part of the 40th anniversary commemorations where over 250 landforms were identified and named after those who had died in the conflict. The adjacent bay has two Hispancized names; Bahia Ruggles is more common, but Bahia Libertad has also been used.
