= Saunders Island, Falkland Islands =

Island in the Falkland Islands

Saunders Island
- Island
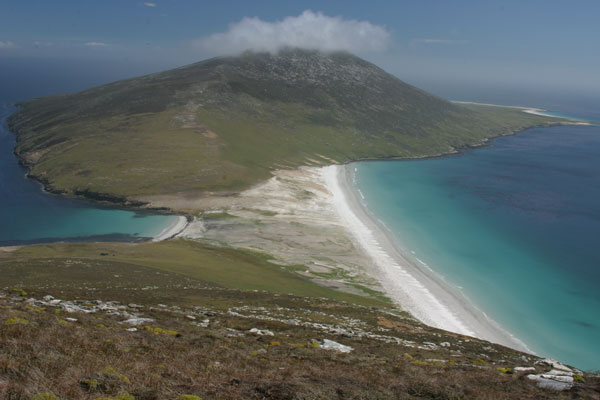

- Saunders Island shown within the Falkland Islands
- Coordinates: 51°20′34″S 60°10′50″W
- Country: Falkland Islands
- Named for: Spanish: Trinity Island
- Main settlement: Saunders Island Settlement

Area
  - Total: 131.6 km^{2} (50.8 sq mi)
  - Rank: 4th
- Highest elevation: 457 m (1,499 ft)
- Time zone: UTC−3 (FKST)
- If shown, area and population ranks are for all islands and all inhabited islands in the Falklands respectively.

Saunders Island (Spanish: Isla Trinidad) is the fourth largest of the Falkland Islands, lying north west of West Falkland. The island is run as a sheep farm.

The island has an area of 131.6 km^{2} (50.8 sq mi) and a coastline of 106.8 km (66.4 mi). It is about 21 km (13 mi) from east to west and almost that distance from north-east to south-west. It consists of three peninsulas linked by narrow necks, and it has three large upland areas. The highest point, Mount Richards, is 457 m (1,499 ft) high.

== History ==
Port Egmont on the island was the site of the first British settlement, established in 1765.

Unaware of the French presence at Port Louis, in January 1765, British captain John Byron explored and claimed Saunders Island, at the western end of the Falkland Islands, where he named the harbour of Port Egmont, and sailed near other islands, which he also claimed for King George III. A British settlement was built at Port Egmont in 1766. Also in 1766, Spain acquired the French colony, and after assuming effective control in 1767, placed the islands under a governor subordinate to Buenos Aires.

During the Falkland Crisis of 1770, five Spanish frigates entered the port and the small British force had to surrender. This edged Britain and Spain closer to war. In 1771, Spain agreed to abandon Port Egmont to the British. In 1776, for economic reasons, the British abandoned Port Egmont. At that time, they placed a plaque at the site proclaiming their sovereignty over the Falklands. The island's present settlement, Saunders Island Settlement, lies on the east coast and has an airstrip.

There is one listed building here, known as the Stone House. There are permanent structures outside the Settlement with heat, electricity and running water for the island's tourist industry. There is a building that holds eight guests at the Neck and an additional building that holds four guests called the Rookery Inn. The island is currently owned by the Pole-Evans family that maintains the farm at the Settlement.

== Conservation ==
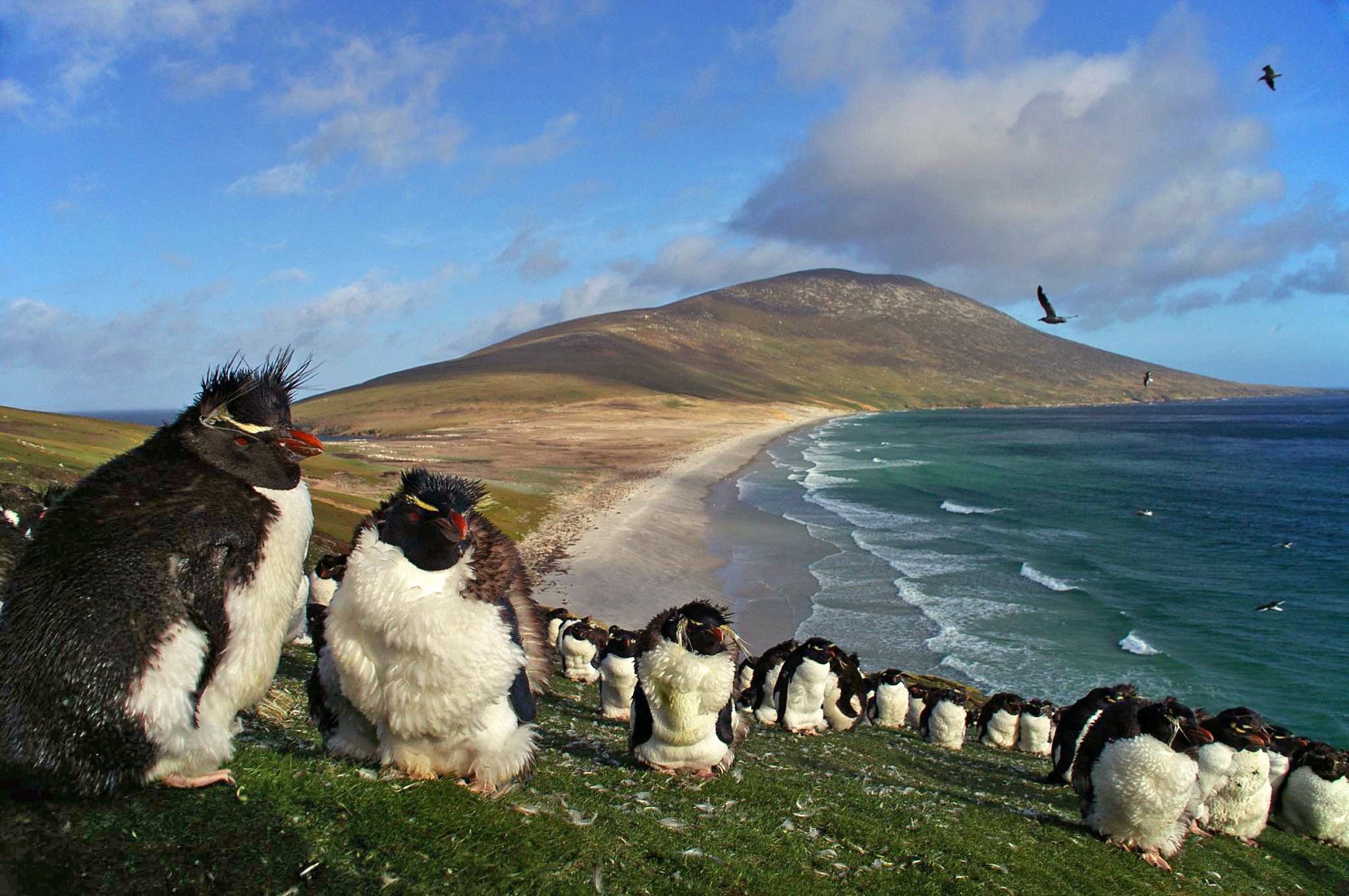
The isthmus of The Neck with rockhoppers

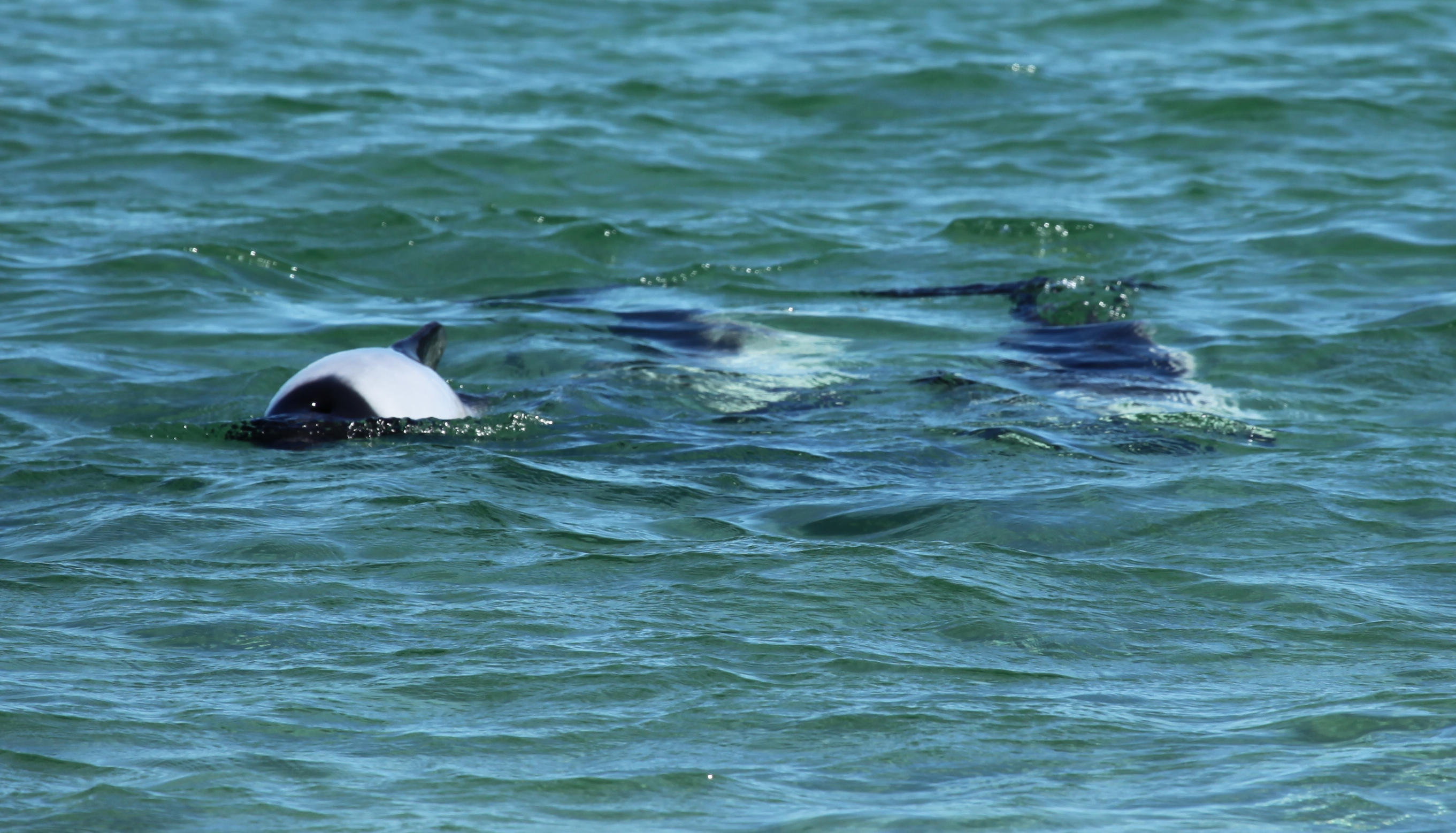
Commerson's dolphins swimming near the shore

Neck of Saunders Islands

Conservation issues include the danger of fire, some erosion prone areas near the coast, overgrazing and the presence of feral cats, mice, rats and rabbits. Clearance of these introduced species is unlikely in the near future because of the size of the island and the varied geography. Spear thistle, accidentally introduced to the island, is a problem; volunteers from Falklands Conservation continue to help control the infestation and there are hopes that the plant can eventually be eradicated. There is a small breeding colony of southern elephant seals at Elephant Point, while a few southern right whales come into bays to rest or feed.

=== Important Bird Area ===
Saunders Island has been identified by BirdLife International as an Important Bird Area (IBA). Birds for which the site is of conservation significance include Falkland steamer ducks (250 breeding pairs), ruddy-headed geese, king penguins, gentoo penguins (6700 pairs), southern rockhopper penguins (6900 pairs), magellanic penguins (4200 pairs), black-browed albatrossess (11,000 pairs) and white-bridled finches. The island is near the southernmost range limit of the Magellanic penguin, while gentoos range much further south into Antarctica. The island also supports near threatened striated caracaras, who closely associate with the abundant seabird colonies at the island's primary isthmus during austral summer. The Royal Air Force Ornithological Society's members conducted a complete coastal survey in 1995.
