= Broken Island =

Broken Island may refer to one of the following:

- Broken Island (Antarctica)
- Broken Island, Falkland Islands
- Broken Island (Seattle)
