= Bleaker Island =

Bleaker Island Former names: Long Island Breaker Island
- Island
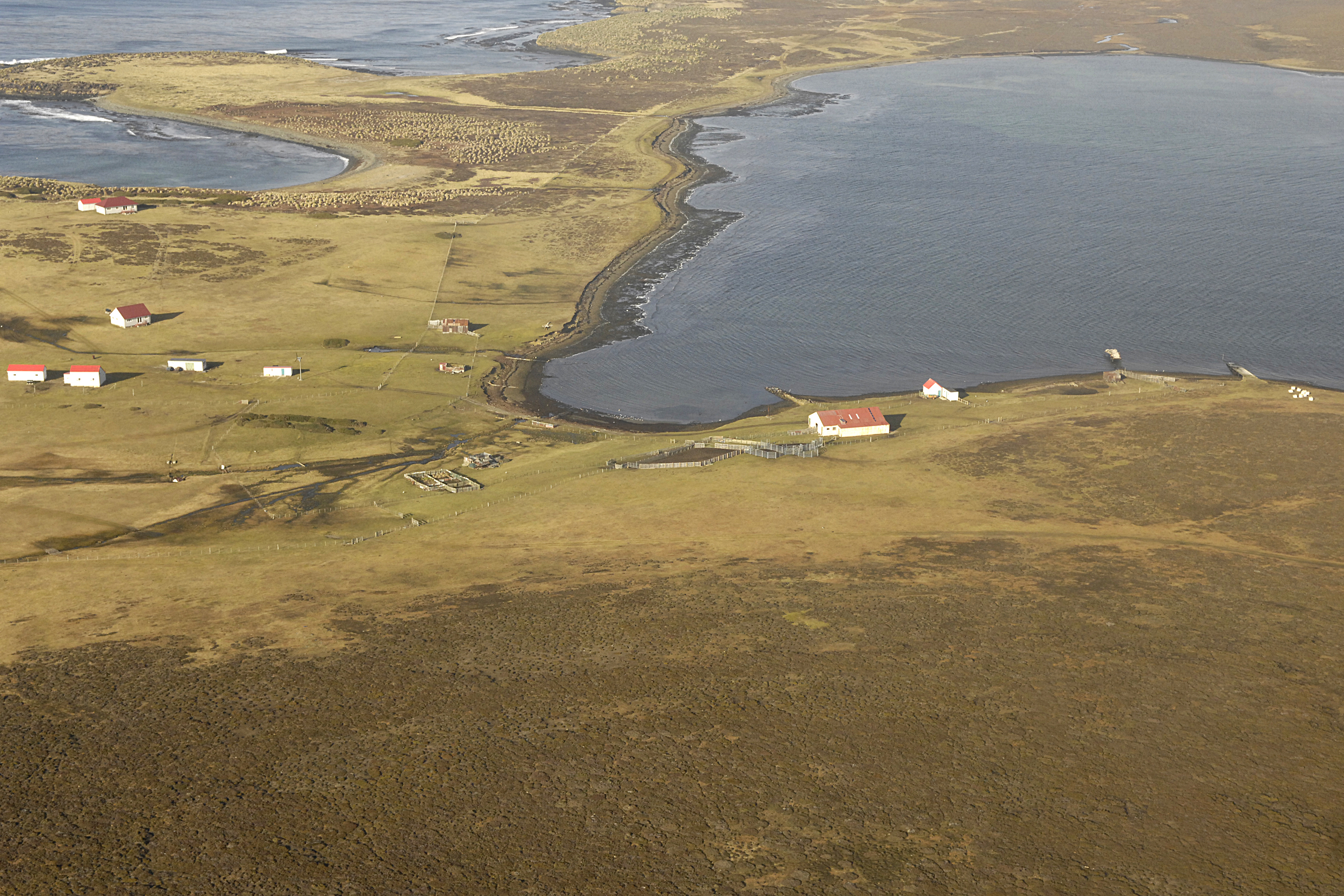
- Bleaker Island Settlement

- Bleaker Island shown within the Falkland Islands
- Coordinates: 52°12′24″S 58°51′02″W
- Country: Falkland Islands

Area
  - Total: 20.7 km^{2} (8.0 sq mi)
- Highest elevation (Semaphore Hill): 27 m (89 ft)

Population (2001)
  - Total: 2
  - Density: 0.097/km^{2} (0.25/sq mi)
- Time zone: UTC−3 (FKST)
- Website: bleakerisland.com
- If shown, area and population ranks are for all islands and all inhabited islands in the Falklands respectively.

Bleaker Island (Spanish: Isla María) is one of the Falkland Islands, lying off south east Lafonia (the southern peninsula of East Falkland). The name is a corruption of "Breaker Island" due to the waves that break on it. It was also known as "Long Island" at one point.

== Geography ==
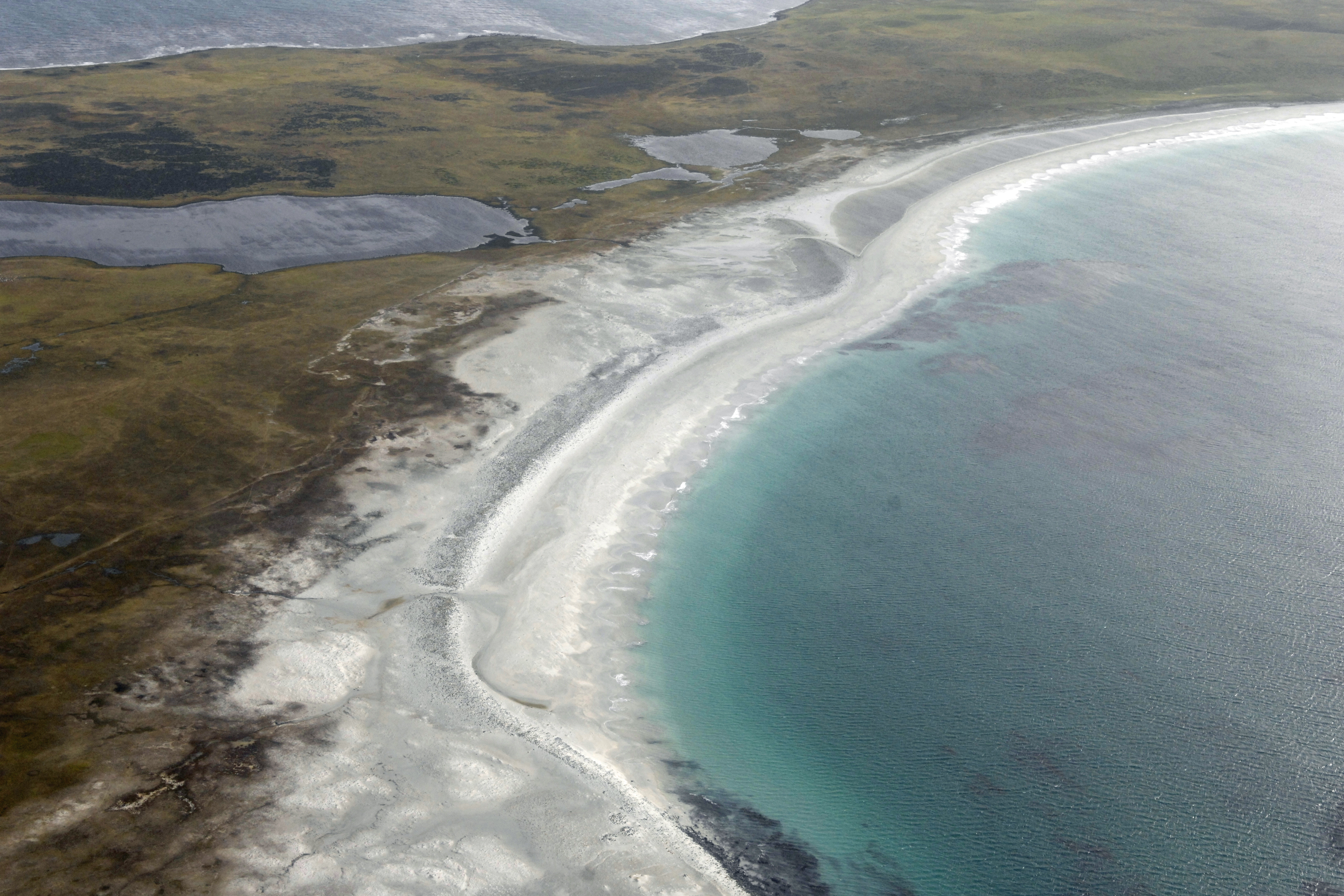
Sandy Bay, Bleaker Island

Bleaker Island is long, narrow and low-lying and the southern tip of the Island is separated from Lafonia by a thin stretch of water named 'The Jump'. It has an area of 20.70 square kilometres (7.99 sq mi) and is 19 kilometres (12 mi) long. The island is no wider than 2.5 km (1.6 mi) at any point and tapers to several thin necks of land at various points down its length. The highest point is Semaphore Hill, at 27 metres (89 ft). The western shores of Bleaker Island are low-lying and fringed by shallow stone beaches. The east coast of the island is characterised by low cliffs, interspersed with sand and pebble beaches and gulches and is directly exposed to the Atlantic Ocean. The island has several large ponds and the most impressive beach is the 2 kilometres (1.2 mi) 'Sandy Bay'.

== History ==
Bleaker Island has been a sheep farm for over a hundred years. The island was managed by Arthur Cobb, a locally well-known agriculturalist and amateur naturalist, in the early 20th century who wrote a book on the subject, containing forty six of his own black and white photographs.

The low aspect of the Island resulted in many ship-wrecks off the Island in the 19th and 20th centuries. There were five ship-wrecks on Bleaker Island in the first quarter of the 20th century. The most famous of these was the French tall ship 'Cassard' wrecked on the southern tip of the Island carrying a cargo of coal in May 1906.

The Island has been run as an organic sheep and cattle farm by Mike and Phyll Rendell since 1999, and has the small Bleaker Island Settlement located on an isthmus in the centre of its length. They built a self-catering cottage, "Cobb's Cottage", and a house there in 2000 called "The Outlook", and in 2011 they added a new house, called "Cassard House". They employ a farming couple who live there.

In 2017 British writer Nell Stevens published a memoir, Bleaker House, about living on Bleaker Island for several months.

== Wildlife ==
The northern half of Bleaker Island is a National Nature Reserve – being designated in 1967. A total of 79 species of flowering plant have been identified on Bleaker Island. Flora includes the yellow and dog orchid, and lady's slipper. A stretch of several kilometres of the east coast is vegetated by stands of tussac grass. The island is home to a wide variety of wildlife including southern sea lions with some visiting southern elephant seals.

Norway rats were accidentally introduced to the island in the 1980s. They have now spread throughout the island and onto First, Second and Third Islands. Overgrazing was a problem but reduced grazing pressure is helping the slow regeneration of tussac and native flowering plants.

=== Birds ===
The Bleaker Island group has been identified by BirdLife International as an Important Bird Area. A survey identified 49 bird species on the islands, 37 of which were confirmed as breeding there. Breeding species include rockhopper, Magellanic and gentoo penguins, king and rock cormorants, many small bird species and several birds of prey, including striated and crested caracaras.
