= List of islands of the Falkland Islands =

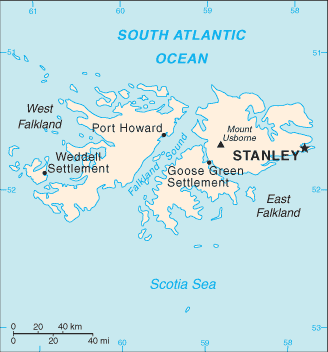
A map of the Falkland Islands

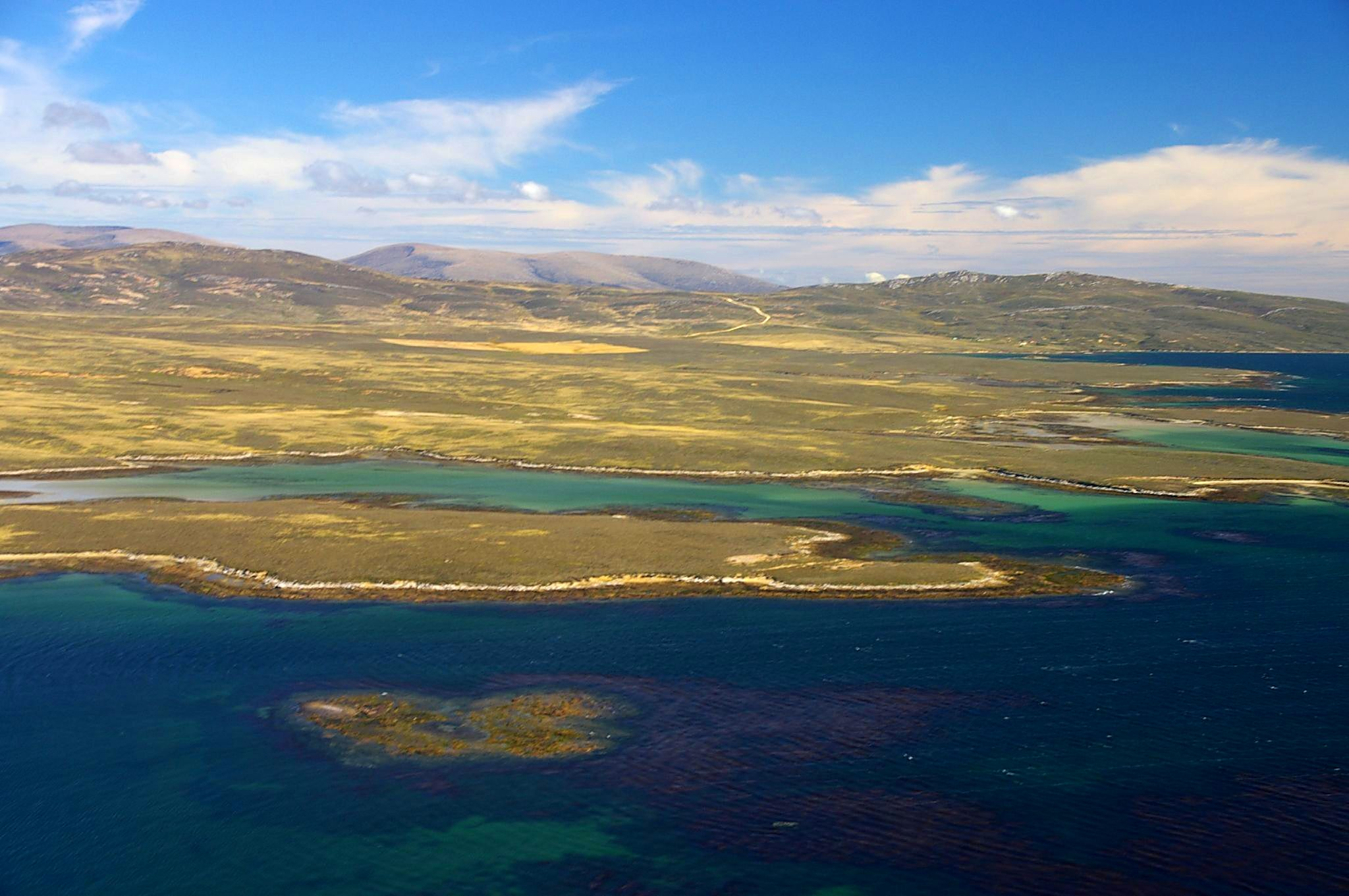
West Falkland from near Keppel Island

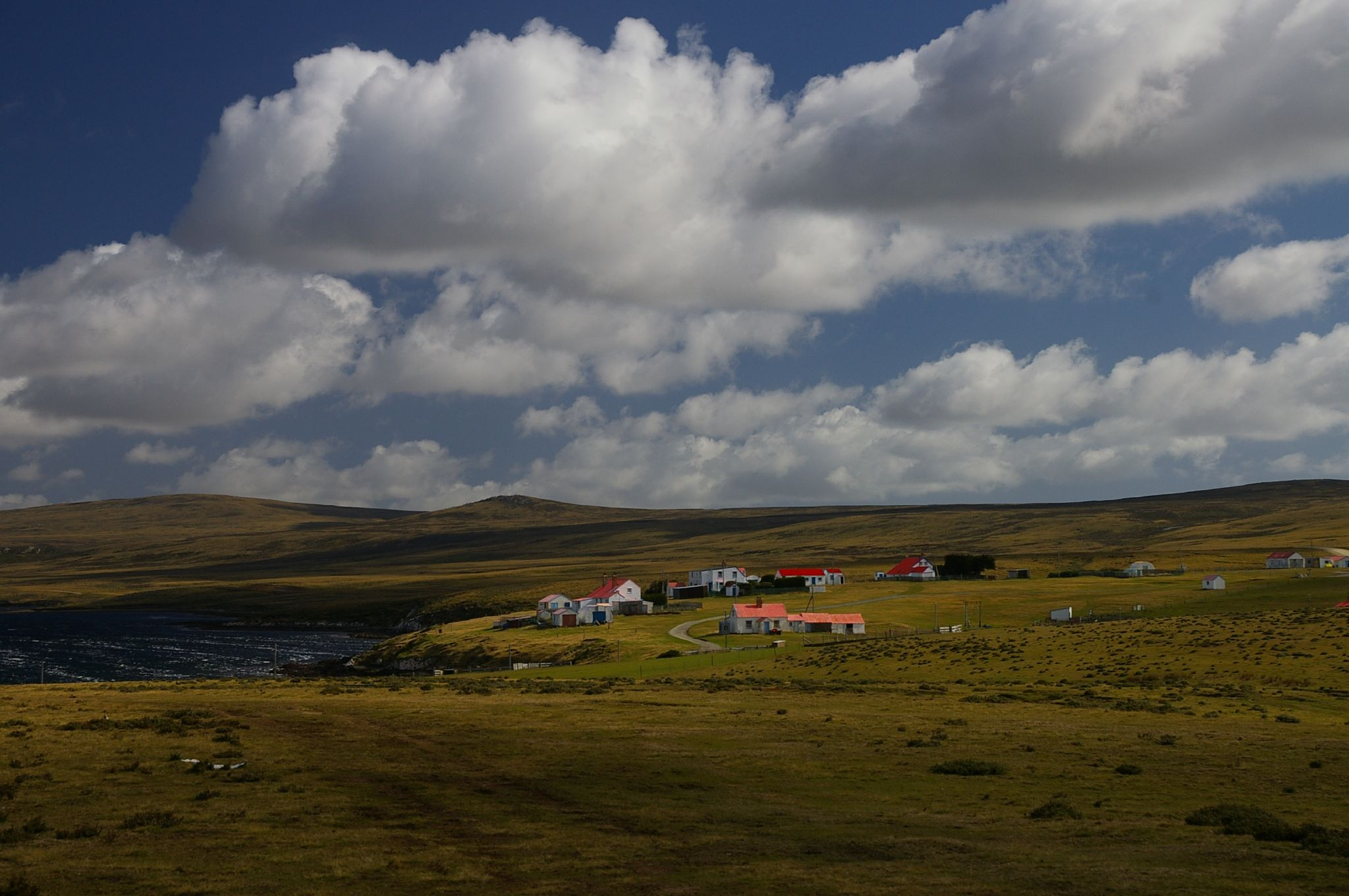
Johnson's Harbour settlement, East Falkland.

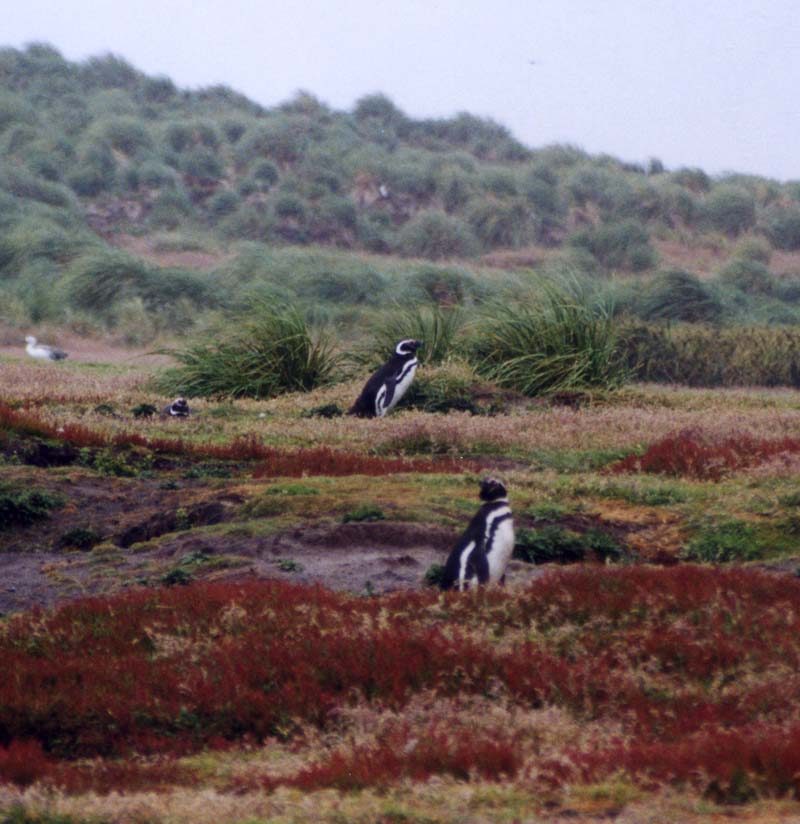
Spheniscus magellanicus on Carcass Island.

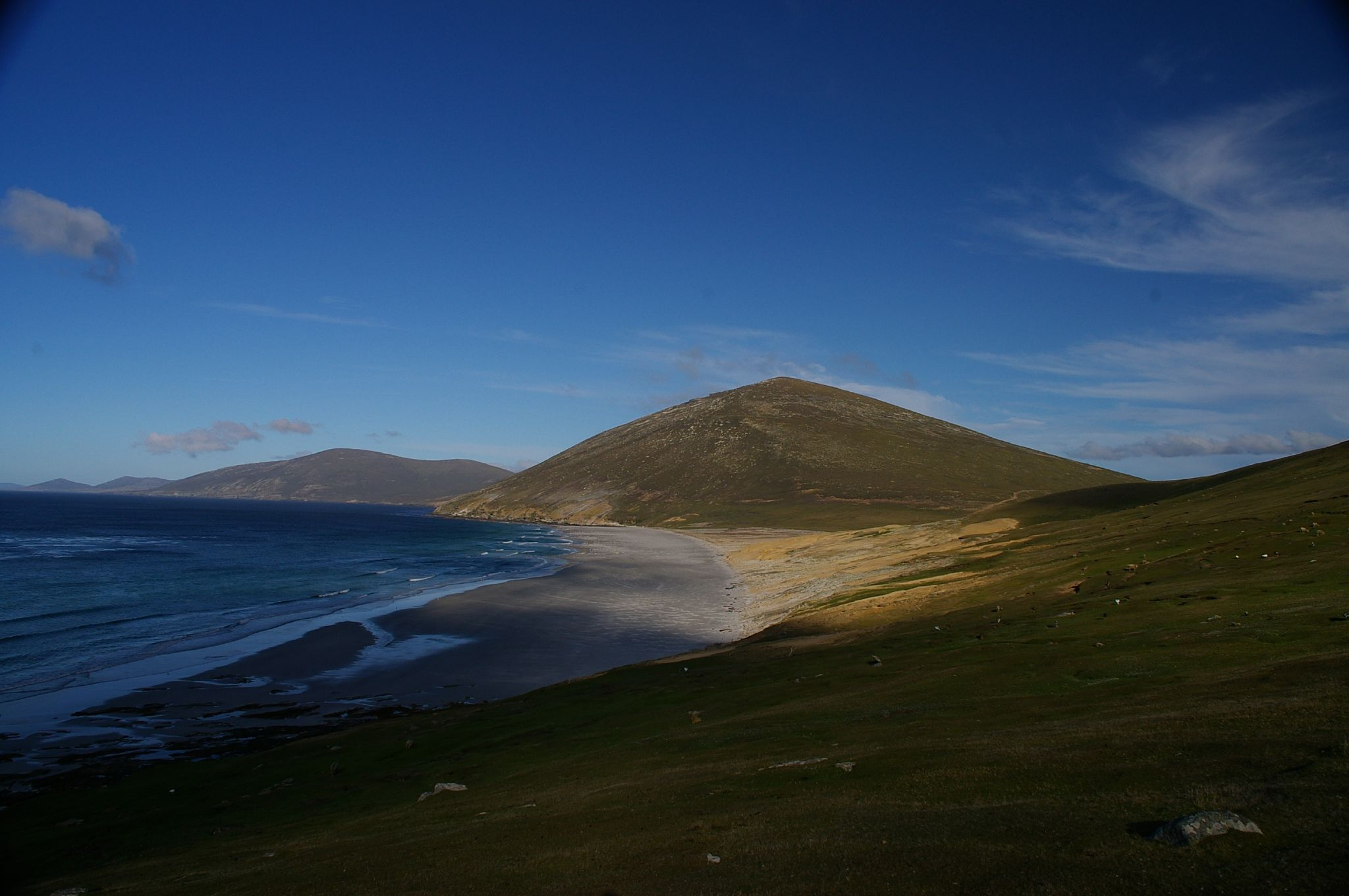
The Neck on Saunders Island.

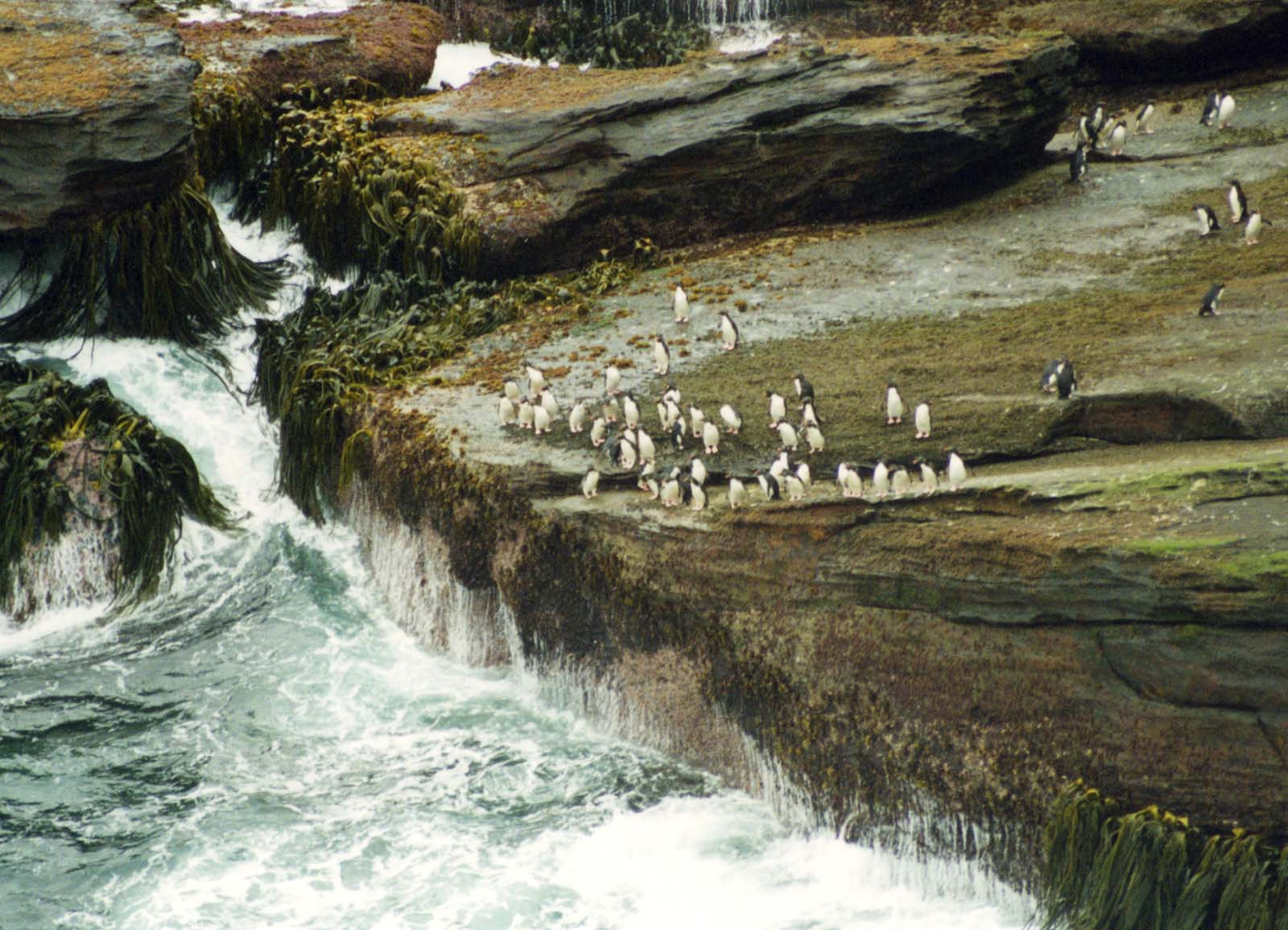
Eudyptes chrysocome on New Island.

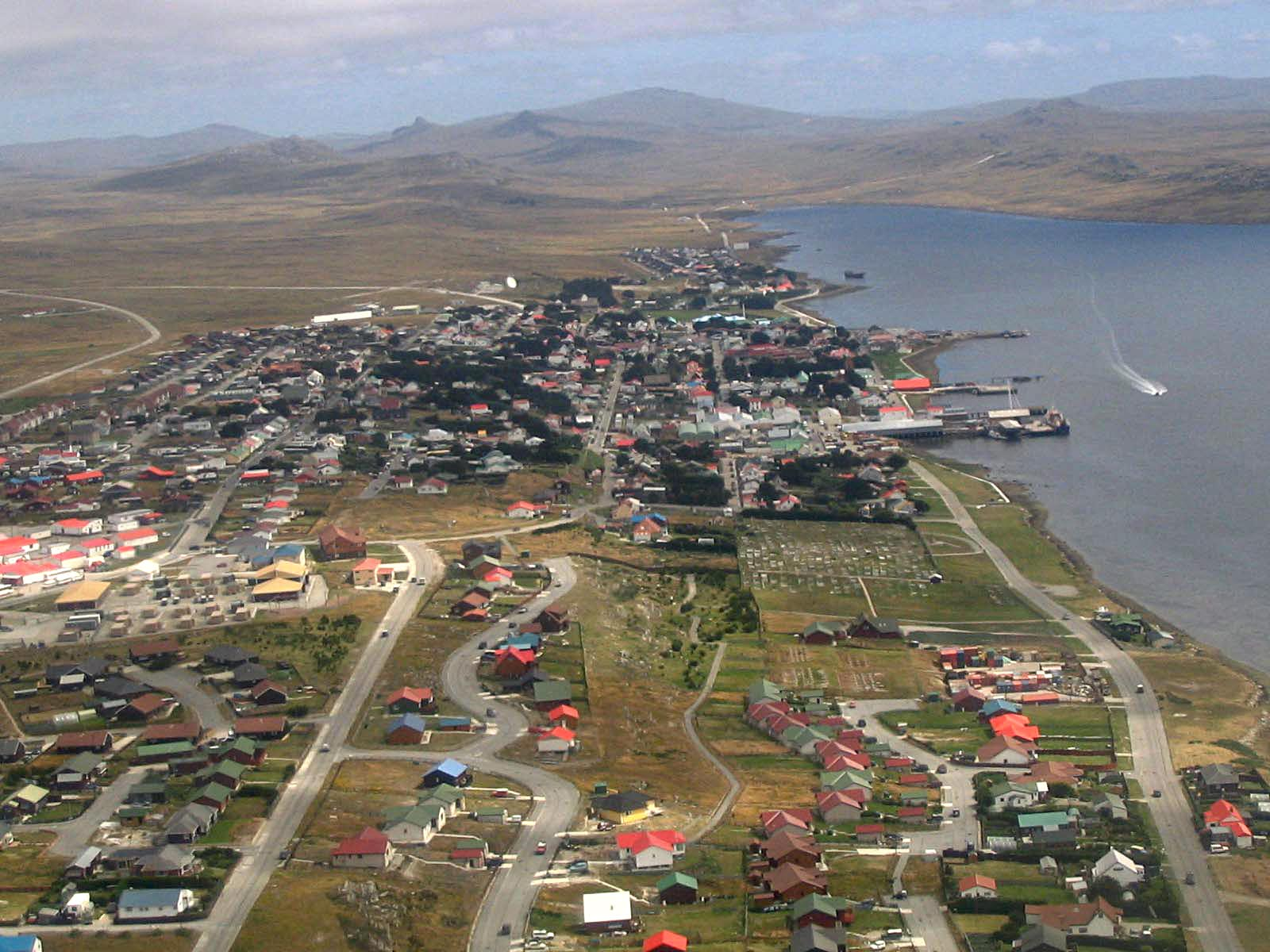
Stanley Harbour, Stanley with mountains in the distance.

The following list contains larger islands and other notable islands in the Falklands. Area data are from the USGS unless otherwise specified.

== Islands larger than 1km^{2} ==
Island	Area (km^{2})	Lat	Long	Highest Point (m)	Group / Area	Ref
East Falkland	6,512.2	-51.750	-58.840	705	main islands	
West Falkland	4,457.3	-51.750	-60.000	700	main islands	
Weddell Island	259.1	-51.904	-61.000	383	Weddell Island Group	
Saunders Island	126.0	-51.344	-60.172	457		
Pebble Island	113.4	-51.299	-59.610	277	Pebble Island Group	
Lively Island	58.3	-52.035	-58.490	37	Lively Island Group	
Speedwell Island	54.0	-52.222	-59.714		Speedwell Island Group	
Keppel Island	41.0	-51.325	-59.975	341		
Beaver Island	38.8	-51.842	-61.276		Beaver Island Group	
George Island	27.2	-52.343	-59.754	18	Speedwell Island Group	
Bleaker Island	22.4	-52.214	-58.872		Bleaker Island Group	
New Island	20.5	-51.719	-61.287	100	New Island Group	
Golding Island	19.4	-51.351	-59.745			
Carcass Island	18.2	-51.280	-60.569	220	West Point Island Group	
Dyke Island	15.9	-51.993	-60.887			
Swan Island	13.7	-51.793	-59.588		Swan Islands	
Grand Jason Island	13.2	-51.057	-61.096	361	Jason Islands	
West Point Island	12.0	-51.356	-60.700	350		
Great Island	12.0	-51.969	-59.695			
Barren Island	11.6	-52.382	-59.709	18	Speedwell Island Group	
Middle Island	9.3	-51.406	-59.710		(Byron Sound)	
Sea Lion Island	9.0	-52.432	-59.104	30	Sea Lion Islands Group	
Steeple Jason Island	8.8	-51.036	-61.212	290	Jason Islands	
First Island	7.8	-51.653	-60.679		Passage Islands	
Second Island	7.3	-51.578	-60.774		Passage Islands	
Broken Island	6.3	-51.344	-59.672			
Ruggles Island	6.3	-52.073	-59.732			
East Island	5.7	-51.375	-59.637		(Byron Sound)	
Fox Island	5.4	-51.841	-60.488		(Spring Point)	
Pebble Islet	5.3	-51.251	-59.874	20	Pebble Island Group	
River Island	5.0	-51.414	-59.616			
Staats Island	4.7	-51.890	-61.189		Beaver Island Group	
South Jason Island	4.3	-51.205	-60.882	300	Jason Islands	
Flat Jason Island	3.6	-51.109	-60.885		Jason Islands	
Sedge Island	3.6	-51.149	-60.404			
Motley Island	3.5	-52.134	-58.616		Lively Island Group	
Long Island	3.3	-51.557	-58.070			
Tea Island	3.3	-51.904	-61.174		Beaver Island Group	
North East Island	3.2	-52.006	-58.369		Lively Island Group	
Hummock Island	3.1	-51.616	-60.441	190	Hummock Island Group	
Philimore Island	3.1	-51.980	-58.466		Lively Island Group	
West Swan Island	3.1	-51.785	-59.645		Swan Islands	
Passage Island	3.0	-51.371	-59.849		(Byron Sound)	
Elephant Jason Island	3.0	-51.159	-60.848	208	Jason Islands	
North Tyssen	2.7	-51.868	-59.604		Tyssen Islands	
Governor Island	2.6	-51.857	-61.187		Beaver Island Group	
Dunbar Island	2.6	-51.363	-60.390	89	West Point Island Group	
Narrow Island	2.4	-51.382	-59.702			
Johnsons Island	2.3	-51.907	-58.523			(Note: Called Seal Island or Lobo Island on some maps.)
Split Island	2.2	-51.474	-60.708		(King George Bay)	
Quaker Island	2.1	-51.785	-61.063		Weddell Island Group	
Rabbit Island	1.9	-51.555	-60.494	91	Hummock Island Group	
Triste Island	1.8	-52.132	-58.718			
Big Arch Island	1.8	-52.213	-60.446		Arch Islands	
Pleasant Island	1.8	-51.805	-58.199			
Blind Island	1.7	-52.274	-59.548			
Penn Island	1.7	-51.789	-61.151		Weddell Island Group	
Beauchene Island	1.6	-52.901	-59.185	70		
Middle Island	1.6	-51.636	-60.349		(King George Bay)	
Fourth Island	1.6	-51.563	-60.874		Passage Islands	
Large Island	1.6	-52.144	-59.006			
Government Islet	1.5	-51.216	-59.917	15	Pebble Island Group	
North Swan Island	1.5	-51.742	-59.518		Swan Islands	
Middle Island	1.5	-51.956	-58.467		Lively Island Group	
West Tyssen	1.4	-51.894	-59.673		Tyssen Islands	
Sandbar Island	1.4	-51.924	-59.648		Tyssen Islands	
Wolfe Island	1.3	-52.024	-59.676			
Box Island	1.2	-51.350	-59.841			
Bense Island	1.1	-51.494	-60.524			
Sea Lion Island	1.1	-51.925	-58.707		(Choiseul Sound)	
Sunday Island	1.1	-51.391	-59.668			
Barclay Island	1.1	-51.787	-61.101		Weddell Island Group	
East Island	1.1	-51.790	-58.064		(Fitzroy)	
Tickle Island	1.1	-51.992	-59.654			
Bird Island	1.1	-52.168	-60.927			
Dry Island	1.0	-51.372	-59.895			
Burnt Island	1.0	-51.418	-60.133			
Third Island	1.0	-51.572	-60.843		Passage Islands	
Tussac Island	1.0	-52.020	-60.968			

== Other notable islands ==
Island	Area (km^{2})	Lat	Long
Sea Dog Island	0.3	-52.005	-61.096
Kidney Island	0.3	-51.624	-57.751
Hog Island	0.3	-51.540	-58.087
Centre Island	0.3	-51.424	-58.310
Sandy Bay Island	0.2	-52.194	-58.804
Eddystone Rock	0.01	-51.189	-59.054
Horse Block	0.003	-51.941	-61.115

== List of Falkland Islands named after people ==
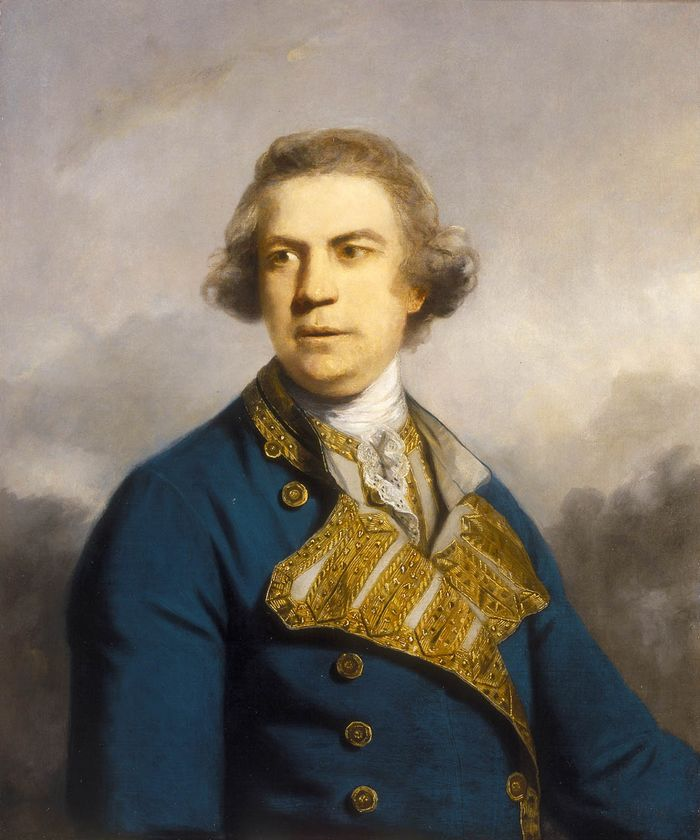
Augustus Keppel, wearing flag officer's undress uniform, 1765, by Reynolds (National Maritime Museum)

This is a short list of islands, which are known to be named after someone. Until at least 1781, the Falklands as a whole were known as the Sebald or Sebaldine Island after Sebald de Weert, who sighted them and tried to make landfall on the Jason Islands in January 1600.

- Beauchene Island - Jacques Gouin de Beauchêne
- Keppel Island - Augustus Keppel
- Lafonia (peninsula) - Samuel Fisher Lafone
- Saunders Island - Charles Saunders
- Tyssen Islands - John Tyssen (1811–1893), British naval officer
- Weddell Island - James Weddell

=== Spanish names derived from people ===
A list of the derivations of Spanish names, where they differ substantially from the English versions.

- Beaver Island - Isla San Rafael - The archangel Raphael
- Lively Island - Isla Bougainville - Louis Antoine de Bougainville
- Jason Islands - Isla Sebaldes - Sebald de Weert
- Pebble Island - Isla (de) Borbón/Isla Bourbon - House of Bourbon
- Weddell Island - Isla San José - Saint Joseph

== See also ==
- Falkland Islands
  - Geography of the Falkland Islands
  - List of Falkland Islands-related topics
- List of islands by area
- List of islands by highest point
- List of islands in the Atlantic Ocean
