= Blackburn River =

River in the Falkland Islands

Coordinates: 51°28′S 59°59′W

The Blackburn River is on West Falkland in the Falkland Islands. It is in the north of the island, and empties into Byron Sound. The name is a tautology, since "burn" is a Lowland Scots/Northern English word referring to a small river or large brook.
