= Keppel Sound =

Coordinates: 51.287°S 59.886°W

Map of the Falkland Islands showing Keppel Sound

Keppel Sound (Spanish: Bahía de la Cruzada ) is a bay to the north of West Falkland in the Falkland Islands. Islands in/bordering the sound include Golding Island and Keppel Island.
