= Golding Island =

- Island
- Golding Island shown within the Falkland Islands
- Coordinates: 51°20′56″S 59°44′49″W
- Country: Falkland Islands
- Time zone: UTC−3 (FKST)
- If shown, area and population ranks are for all islands and all inhabited islands in the Falklands respectively.

Golding Island (sometimes seen spelt as "Goulding Island") is one of the Falkland Islands, just to the north of West Falkland in Keppel Sound and near Keppel and Pebble Islands. It has a complex shape, with narrow headlands and bays, and a pond in the middle.

Golding Island is a sheep farm, and was previously farmed together with Pebble Island and Keppel Island by the Dean Brothers. The settlement is in the south east, near Hummock Point.

After a raid on San Carlos Water during the Falklands War, Capitan Garcia, an Argentine airman, ejected from his aircraft, an Argentine A-4C Skyhawk . At the time, his body was not recovered, but was washed ashore in a dinghy in 1983. The island was also bombed during the War by the Argentines who thought that they picked up a radio transmission from here.
