= Falklands Conservation =

Charitable organisation

Falklands Conservation (FC) is a charitable organisation formed to protect the wildlife and the natural environment of the Falkland Islands in the South Atlantic Ocean. It intends to conserve and undertake scientific research in the biosphere of the Falkland Islands and publish the results of the research to inform the public in the field of nature conservation. They also intend to preserve the Falkland Islands heritage and carry out other charitable activities. Falklands Conservation is a member of the International Union for Conservation of Nature and has a partnership with BirdLife International, representing the Falkland Islands.

== History ==
The origins of FC go back to 1979 when a group of naturalists, including Peter Scott, established a UK registered charity, the Falkland Islands Foundation (FIF), to protect the wildlife of the Falklands and its historic shipwrecks. In 1980 another body, the Falkland Islands Trust (FIT) was formed in the Islands.

In 1982, following the Falklands War, FIF became a membership-based organisation. With the merger of FIT and FIF in 1991, it was formally launched on 1 August by David Attenborough as Falklands Conservation.

== Sei whale surveys ==
From 2017 Falkland Conservation was involved in a five-year monitoring project for globally endangered sei whales, conducting surveys and collecting data on the species on the Falkland Islands' inner shelf waters, down to a depth of 100 m (330 ft), determining that it formed a Key Biodiversity Area for the species.
