= Pebble Island =

- Island
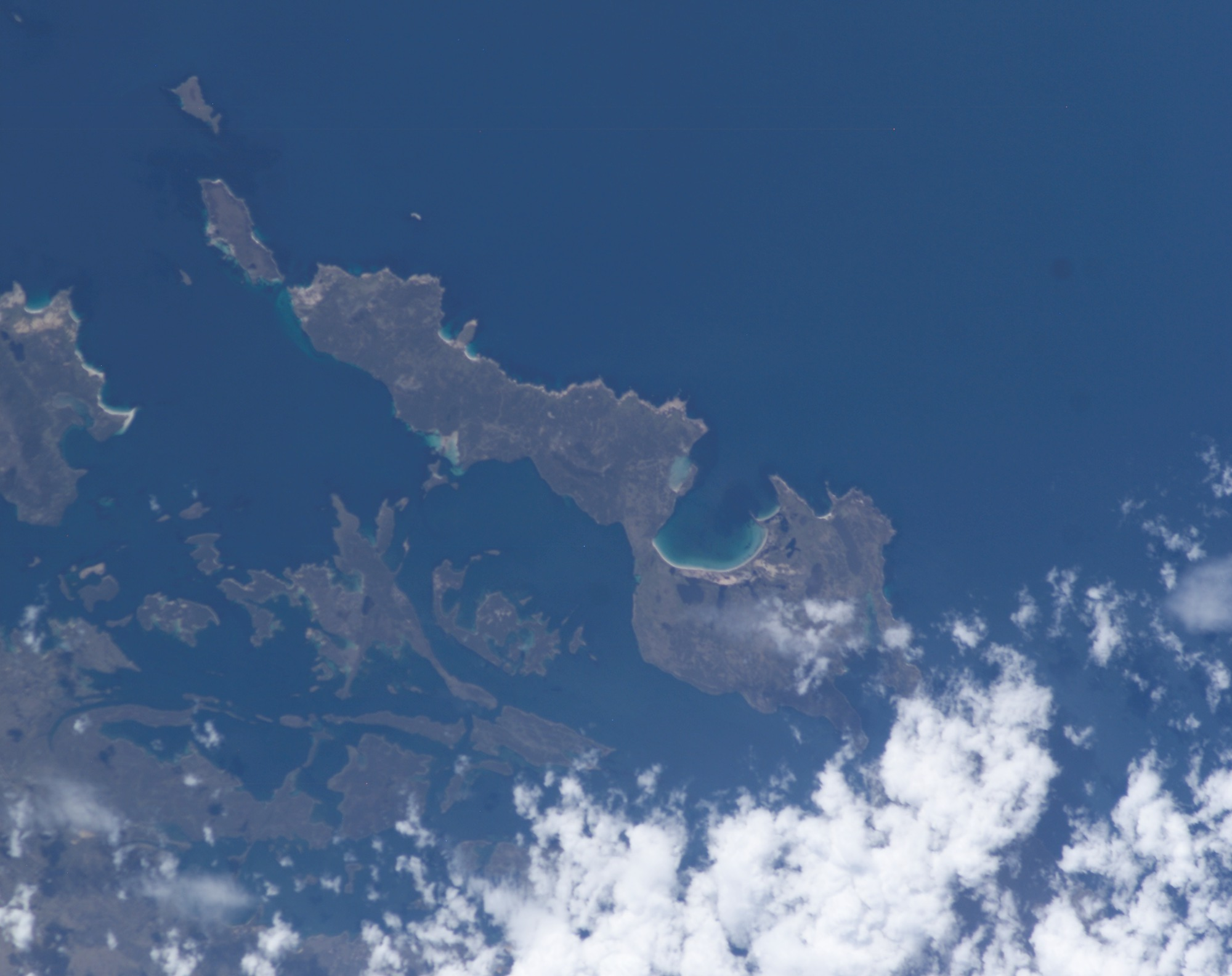

- Location of Pebble Island
- Coordinates: 51°18′11″S 59°37′46″W
- Country: Falkland Islands
- Main settlement: Pebble Island Settlement

Area
  - Total: 103.36 km^{2} (39.91 sq mi)
- Highest elevation: 277 m (909 ft)

Population (circa 1982)
  - Total: 25
  - Density: 0.24/km^{2} (0.63/sq mi)
- Time zone: UTC−3 (FKST)
- If shown, area and population ranks are for all islands and all inhabited islands in the Falklands respectively.

Pebble Island is one of the Falkland Islands, situated north of West Falkland. It is possibly named after the peculiarly spherical pebbles found at its western tip.

== Description ==
The island, the fifth largest in the Falklands archipelago, stretches for 35 kilometres (22 mi) and about 6 kilometres (4 mi) at its widest point, with a total area of 103.36 km^{2} (39.91 sq mi). Its three high points are First Mountain 277 m (909 ft), Middle Mountain 214 m (702 ft) and Marble Mountain 237 m (778 ft), all of which lie in the western part of the island. The eastern part of the island has lakes and wetlands and is of high conservation value. The two halves are joined by an isthmus on which lies Pebble Island Settlement where the inhabitants live. The island has been a sheep farm since 1846; 6,000 Corriedale sheep are farmed, along with 125 head of beef and dairy cattle.

== Settlement ==
Pebble Island Settlement (Spanish/Argentine name: Puerto Calderón)(51°18′32″S 59°36′37″W) is the headquarters of the Pebble Island farm, and is located on the island's isthmus. There is a shop (open three days a week), a one classroom school, an airstrip, a hotel and a golf course.

== History ==
The settlement's Spanish name "Puerto Calderón" (meaning "port of the cauldron [or vat]") reflects the area's early history in sealing, and hunting penguins for oil.

The farm was established in 1846 by John Markham Dean (elsewhere, John Henry Dean), an Englishman who bought Pebble and three neighbouring islands for £400. Dean's family concern passed on to Dean Brothers Ltd, and was managed locally by Raymond Evans (and formerly his father Griff), the great nephew of Johnny Evans who introduced sheep to the island and slaughtered the first feral cattle. The ownership of Pebble Island and several outlying islands passed from Dean Brothers Ltd to the Goulds in 2025.

In the early 1900s, an extensive set of fossils was collected on Pebble island by Constance Allardyce, the wife of the Governor, William Allardyce; she shared many of these with John Mason Clarke, an American paleontologist, and they proved to be of significance for understanding the geological history of the South Atlantic.

During the Falklands War, the island was occupied by Argentine forces which created the Estación Aeronaval Calderón (naval air station Calderon), protected by elements of 2nd Naval Infantry Battalion, which was assaulted successfully by the British Special Air Service. Thirty to one-hundred and fifty Argentine soldiers were based here to protect the airfield.

HMS Coventry was sunk off the coast of Pebble Island. According to the inquiry into its loss, the ship sank 10 miles (16 km) north of Pebble Island in May 1982. The co-ordinates of the sinking are 51 03.6S, 59 42.2W and this is about 11.5 nautical miles (21.3 km; 13.2 mi) from the nearest point on Pebble Island. There are memorials on the island to the British destroyer HMS Coventry and to an Argentinian Lear Jet, both destroyed during the conflict.

More recently, Pebble Island Settlement became one of the first in the Falkland Islands to use wind turbines to generate most of its electricity.

In October 2018, it was announced that Pebble Island was up for sale by Claire Harris, descendant of John Markham Dean. The new buyer would need to obtain a licence from the Falklands Government to ensure that the island is kept in line with the rest of the islands.

== Important bird area ==
Pebble Island can be divided into a marshy east, known for its waterfowl and wading birds as well as a hilly west, known for its penguins. The Pebble Island group, including the much smaller White Island and some islets, has been identified by BirdLife International as an Important Bird Area (IBA). Birds for which the site is of conservation significance include Falkland steamer ducks (100 breeding pairs), ruddy-headed geese (175 pairs), gentoo penguins (1700 pairs), southern rockhopper penguins (6800 pairs), macaroni penguins (10 pairs), southern giant petrels (20 pairs), sooty shearwaters (100 pairs), striated caracaras, white-bridled finches, blackish cinclodes and Cobb's wrens. black-necked and Coscoroba swans breed on the main island.
