= Byron Sound =

Bay on the coast of West Falkland

Coordinates: 51.435°S 60.299°W

Map of the Falkland Islands showing Byron Sound

Byron Sound (Spanish: Bahia San Francisco de Paula) is a large fjord-like bay on the coast of West Falkland in the Falkland Islands, facing northwards. There is one main settlement on the bay: Hill Cove, and it contains numerous islands, including Saunders Island. It appears to be the glacially enlarged estuary of the Blackburn River.

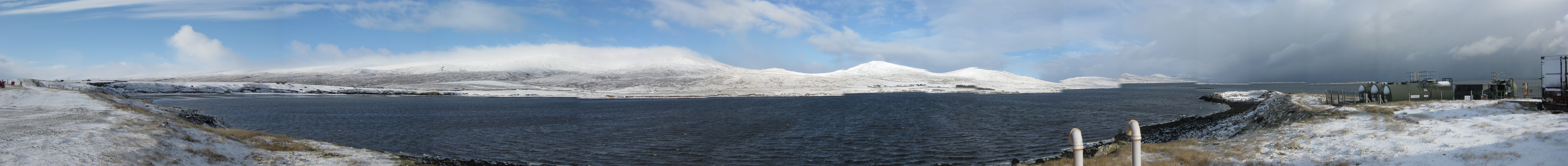
Panorama of Byron Sound
