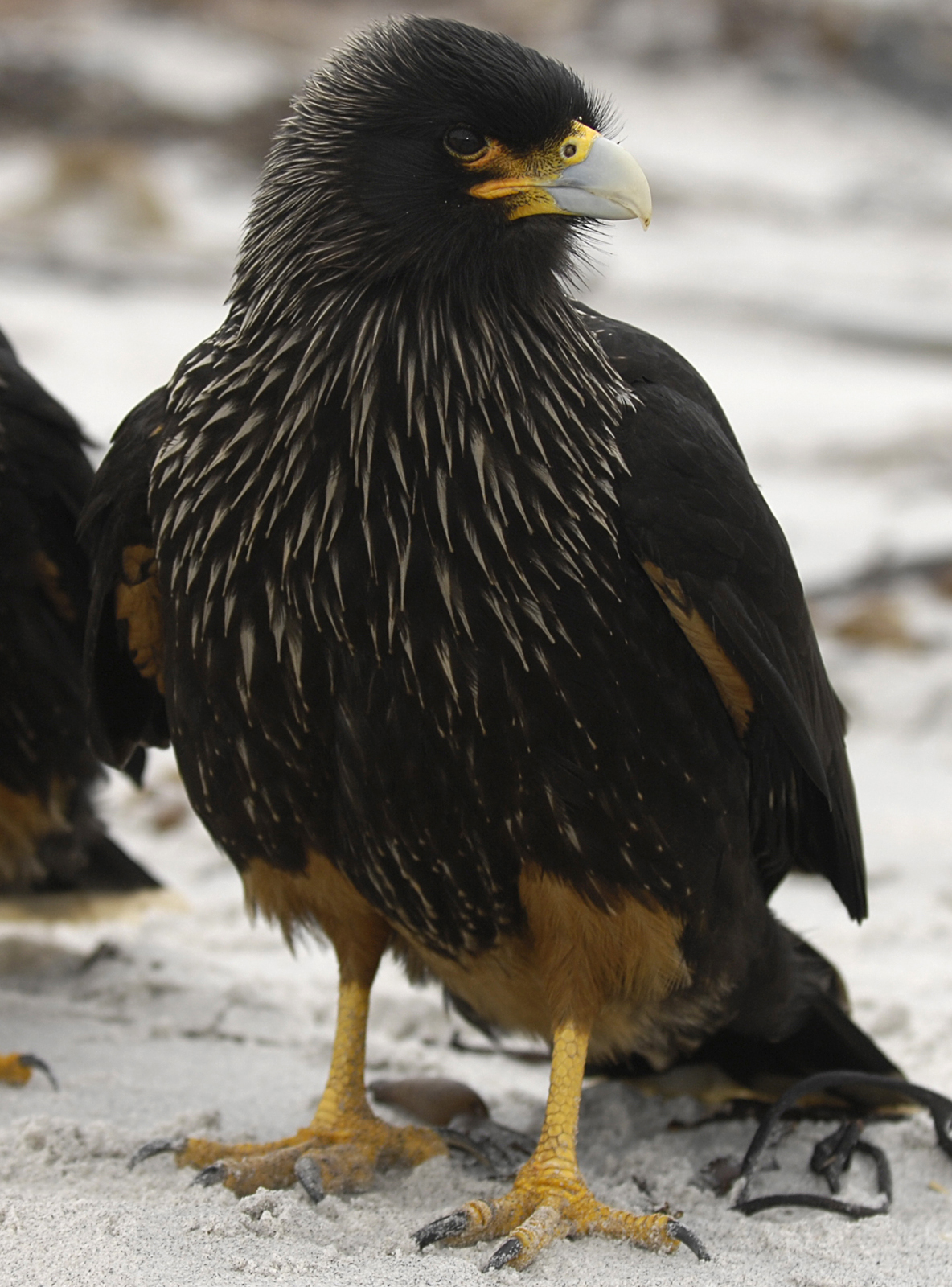
- Striated caracara adult on Sea Lion Island, Falkland Islands

Conservation status
- Near Threatened (IUCN 3.1)
- CITES Appendix II

Scientific classification
- Kingdom: Animalia
- Phylum: Chordata
- Class: Aves
- Order: Falconiformes
- Family: Falconidae
- Genus: Daptrius
- Species: D. australis

Binomial name
- Daptrius australis (Gmelin, JF, 1788)

Synonyms
- Phalcoboenus australis

= Striated caracara =

Species of bird

The striated caracara (Daptrius australis), also known as Forster's caracara, is a Near Threatened bird of prey of the family Falconidae, the falcons and caracaras. It is found in Tierra del Fuego and the Falkland Islands. In the Falklands it is known as the Johnny rook, probably named after the Johnny penguin (gentoo penguin).

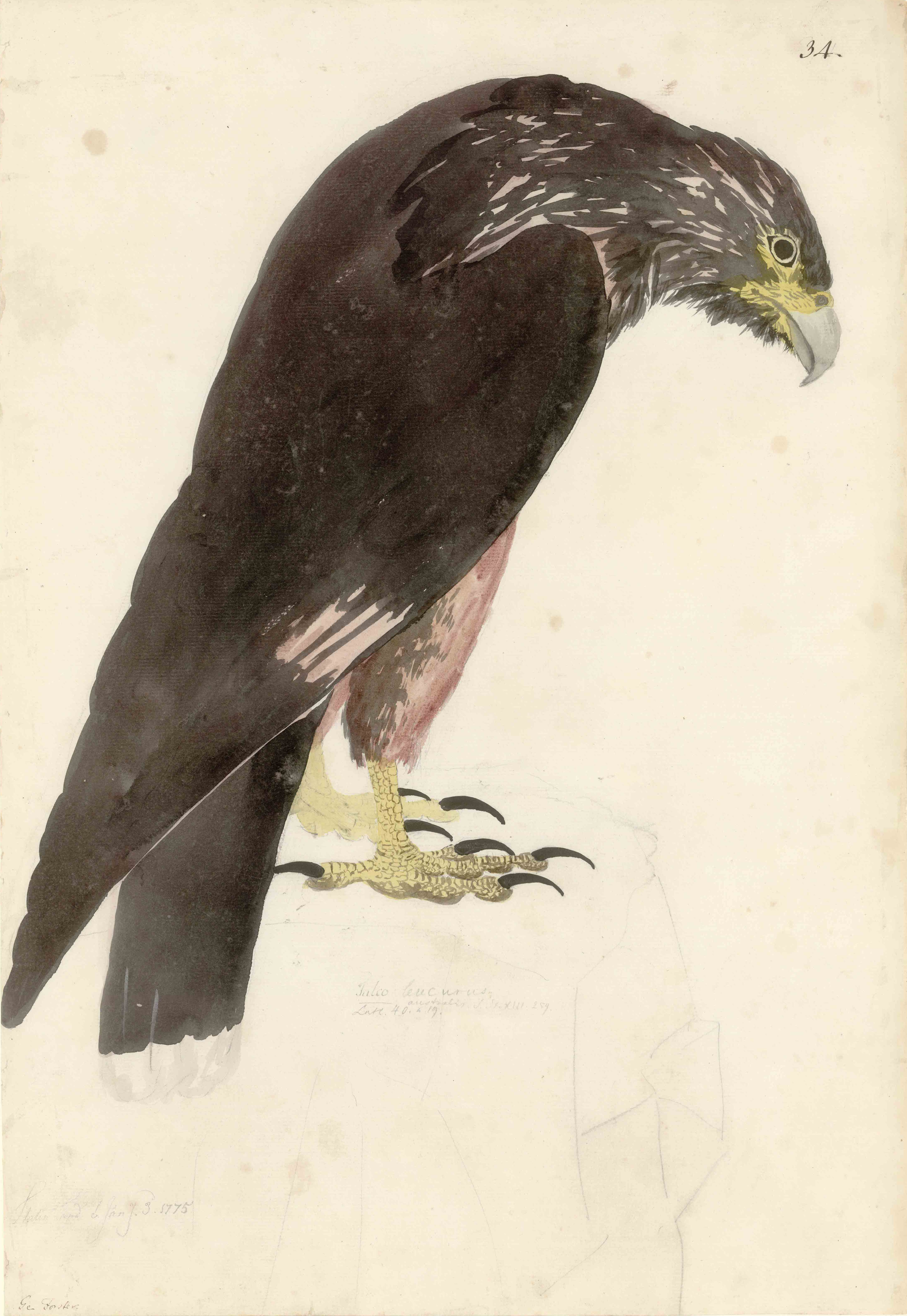
Watercolour made by Georg Forster in 1775 on James Cook's second voyage to the Pacific Ocean.

== Taxonomy and systematics ==
The striated caracara was formally described in 1788 by the German naturalist Johann Friedrich Gmelin in his revised and expanded edition of Carl Linnaeus's Systema Naturae. He placed it with the falcons and eagles in the genus Falco and coined the binomial name Falco australis. The specific epithet australis is Latin meaning "southern". Gmelin based his description on the "Statenland eagle" that had been described in 1781 by the English ornithologist John Latham in his A General Synopsis of Birds. Latham had obtained notes on the bird from the naturalist Johann Reinhold Forster. Johann Forster and his son Georg Forster had accompanied James Cook on his second voyage to the Pacific Ocean. The son Georg made a water-colour drawing of the striated caracara during their visit to Staten Island (Isla de los Estados, east of Tierra del Fuego). The drawing is dated 3 January 1775 and is now held by the Natural History Museum in London.

The striated caracara was formerly placed in the genus Phalcoboenus. Molecular genetic studies found that the genus Milvago was polyphyletic with the chimango caracara sister to the genus Phalcoboenus and the yellow-headed caracara sister to the genus Daptrius. As the genetic divergence was relatively shallow, the polyphyly was resolved by expanding the genus Daptrius to include the species formerly placed in the genera Milvago and Phalcoboenus. The species is monotypic: no subspecies are recognised.

== Description ==
The striated caracara is 53 to 65 cm (21 to 26 in) long with a wingspan of 116 to 125 cm (46 to 49 in), and weighs about 1.2 kg (2.6 lb). The sexes' plumages are alike. Adults are mostly black to brownish black with white or tawny streaks on the upper back, neck, and breast. Their tail has a wide white tip, their underwing coverts and thighs are bright rusty rufous, and their primaries have white bases. The bare skin on their face is salmon pink to yellowish orange, their iris brown, and their legs and feet bright orange-yellow. Juveniles are black to brownish black with a chestnut tail and gray bare parts; they gradually attain adult plumage and bare skin colors over their first five years.

The most common calls are "a cat-like wailing waa-aow, a high-pitched, repeated scream, a loud cawing kaa in face of human intruders, and short sharp clicks around the nest."

== Distribution and habitat ==
The striated caracara is found on the outer Falkland Islands, Isla Grande de Tierra del Fuego, Isla de los Estados (Staten Island), Isla Navarino, Cape Horn, and other islands in the far south of Argentina and Chile. It was hunted to extirpation on East Falkland. It primarily inhabits rocky coasts with adjacent tussock grass but also ranges inland to mountain foothills up to about 500 m (1,600 ft) above sea level. It is generally non-migratory but may move seasonally to higher elevations. It also may be only a winter visitor to some of the South American islands.

== Behavior ==
=== Feeding ===
The striated caracara is an opportunist species, feeding on everything from carrion, seabirds, marine mammals, invertebrates, stolen eggs, livestock, and food scraps around human settlements. Recorded prey species include penguin adults and chicks, brown skua, seal pups such as the South American fur seal and Southern elephant seal, blackish cinclodes, various shellfish, and eggs from nesting seabirds including penguins, cormorants; among many other species. Most predation of larger species is usually done in small groups, where they together mob the larger animal. Invertebrates are also part of their diet, including kelp fly larvae dug from intertidal kelp wrack, beetles, mussels, limpets, and earthworms dug from invasive grasses in hillside drainages. They also have been recorded predating young lambs, which led to persecution by sheep farmers before a 1999 law forbid killing the species. Striated caracaras are also parasitic, displacing and robbing scavengers and small groups will attack healthy birds as large as kelp geese (Chloephaga hybrida). A population of striated caracaras on New Island was found to largely subsist on live slender-billed prions (both nestlings and older birds), which were hunted in the open or taken from nest burrows.

Recent tests of wild striated caracaras in the Falklands have demonstrated that they have problem-solving abilities comparable to parrots.

=== Breeding ===
On the Falkland Islands the striated caracara breeds between late October and January. Its nest is built of twigs and grass on the ground, under tussoc grass clumps, or on cliff ledges. It usually nests in loose colonies with nests sometimes as little as 7 m (20 ft) apart, and there is some evidence of cooperative breeding. The clutch size is usually two eggs but can be up to four. The incubation period, time to fledging, and details of parental care are not known.

== Status ==
The IUCN has assessed the striated caracara as Near Threatened. It has a restricted range and an estimated population between 2,500 - 5,000 mature individuals, which is believed to be decreasing. The predicted ecosystem stresses of climate change are the only known significant threat. The breeding population on the Falklands in 2006 was about 500 pairs, and 350 to 450 pairs may also be on the South American islands.

== Gallery ==
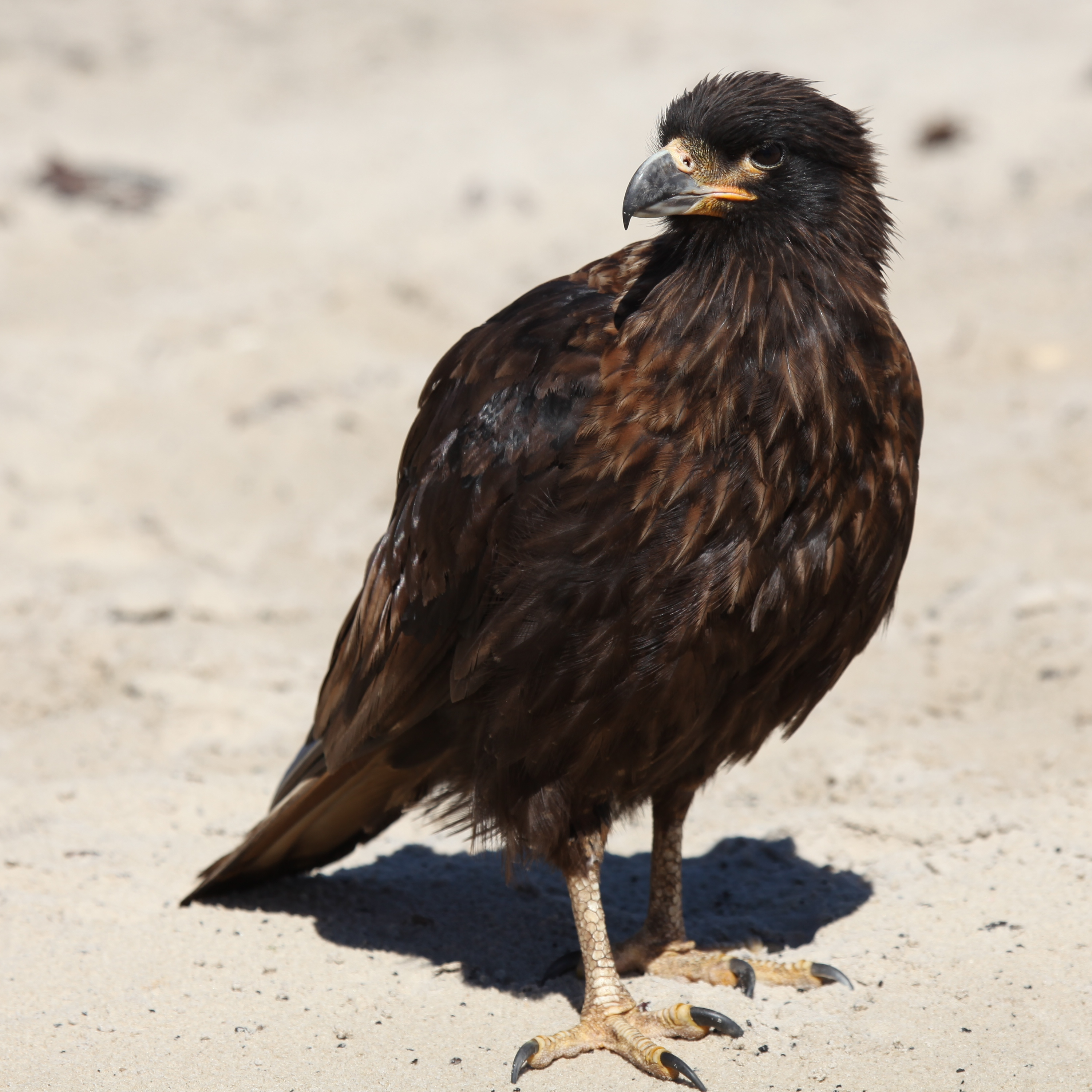
Immature striated caracara on Saunders Island, Falkland Islands

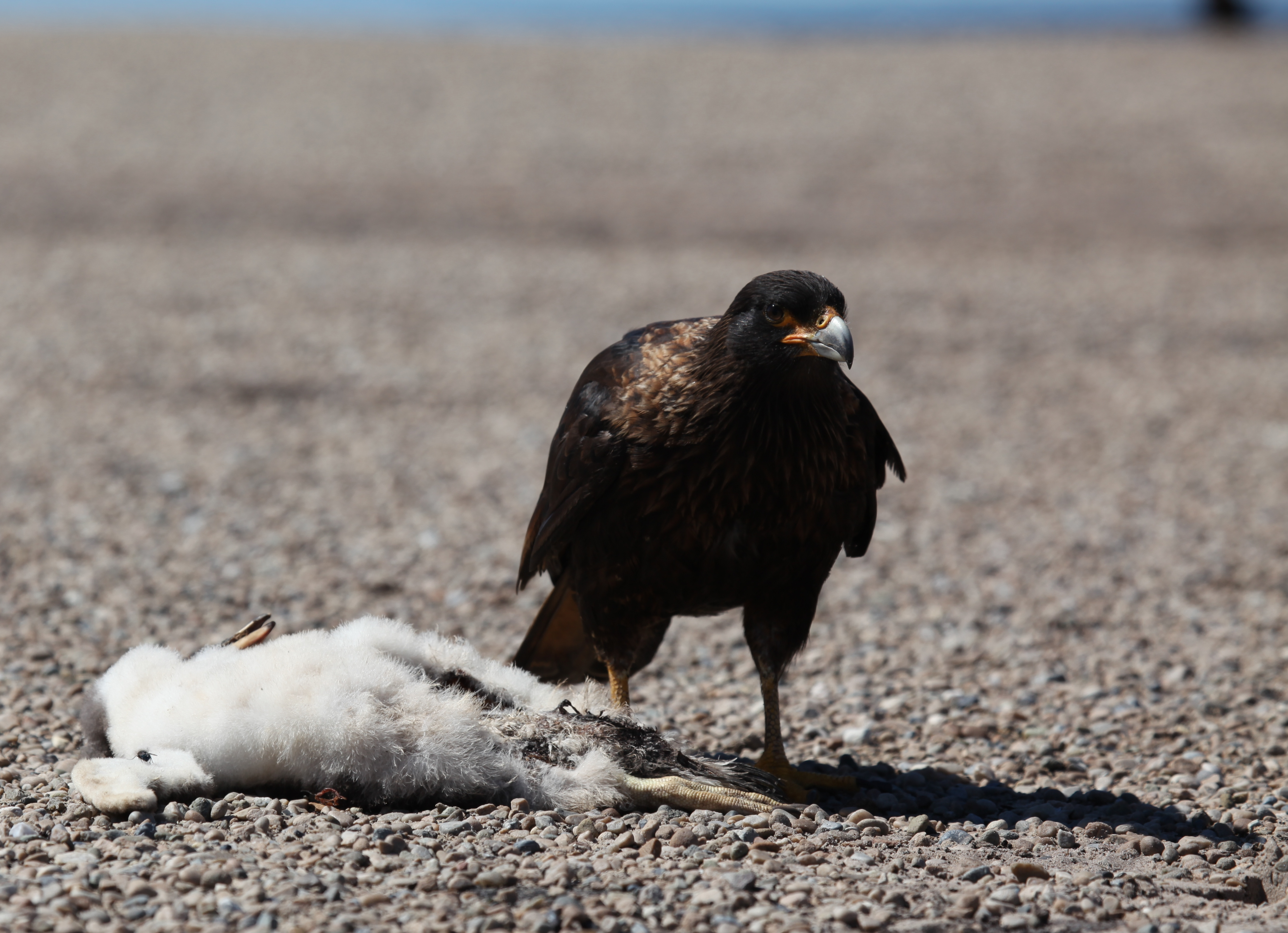
Subadult striated caracara feeding on a dead gentoo penguin chick

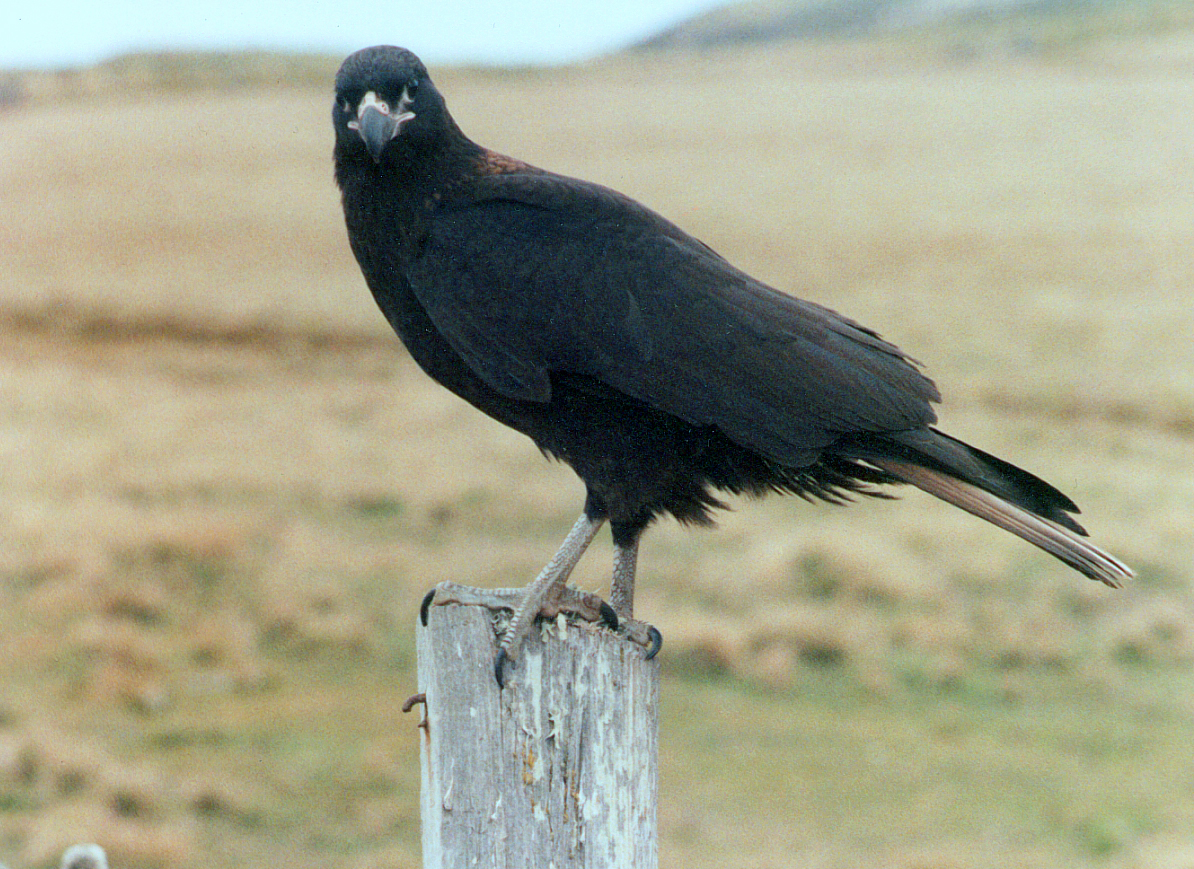
Juvenile (2 year old) striated caracara

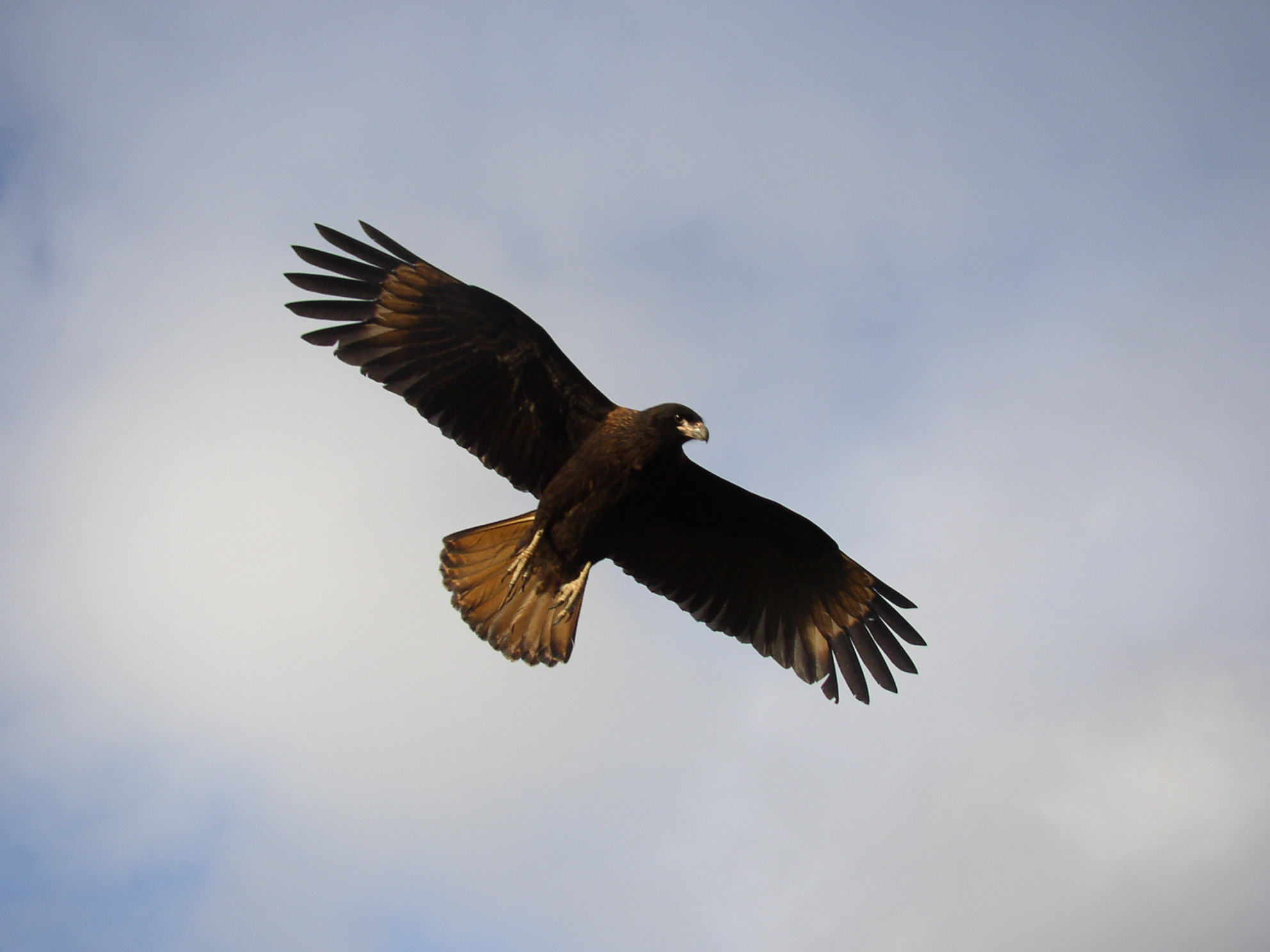

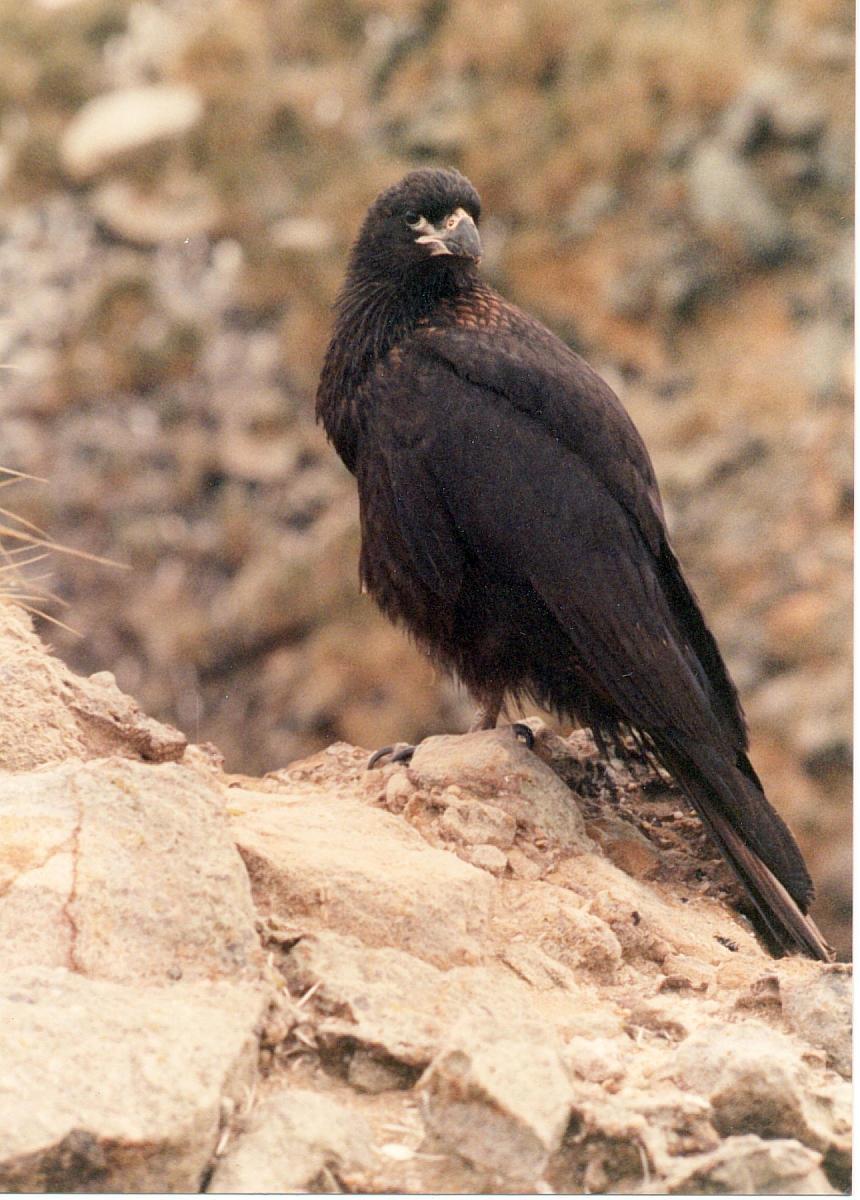

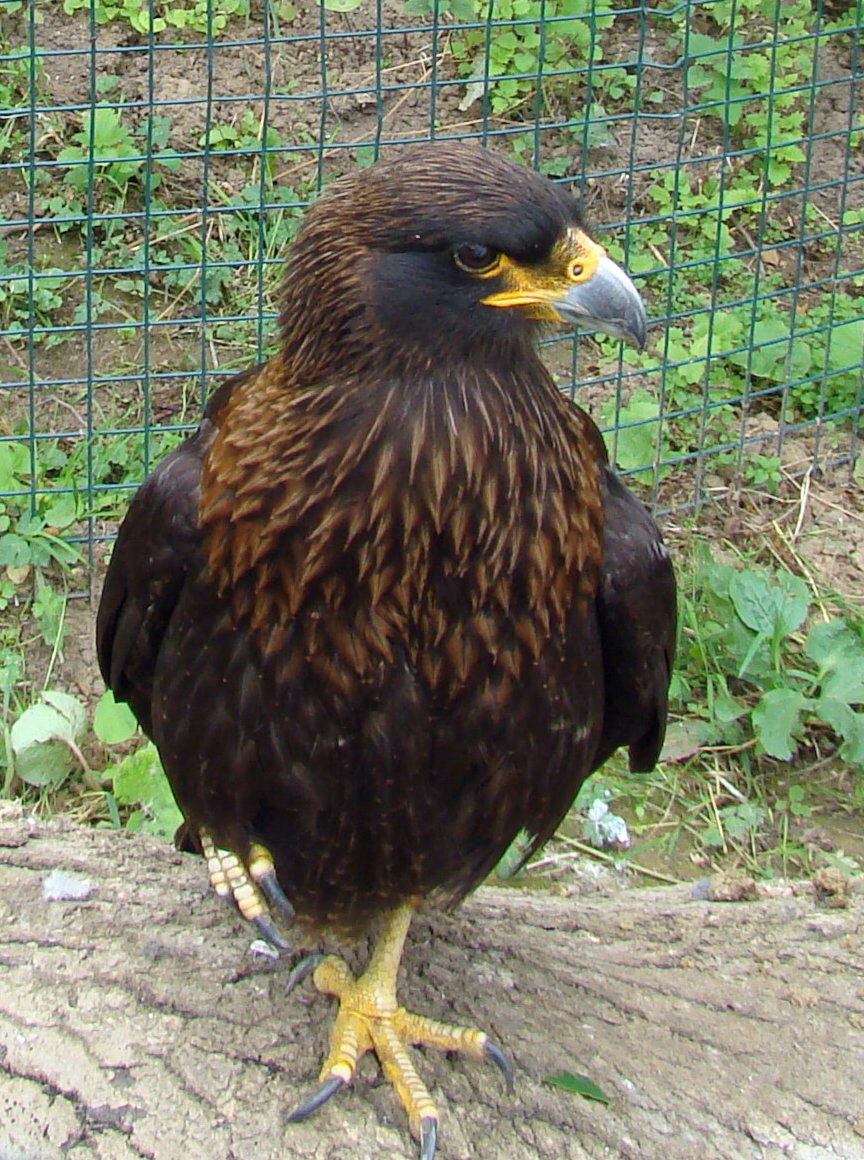
Subadult striated caracara at Amazona Zoo, Norfolk, England
