= Time in the Falkland Islands =

- Time zone

UTC offset
- FKST: UTC−03:00

Current time
- 01:54, 10 November 2025 UTC−03:00 [refresh]

Observance of DST
- DST is not observed in this time zone.

The Falkland Islands has officially used Falkland Islands Standard Time (FKST, UTC−03:00) all year round since 5 September 2010. However, many residents of Camp (all areas of the Falkland Islands outside the main city) use UTC−04:00, known in the Falklands as 'Camp time' (as opposed to 'Stanley time' or 'Government clocks').

The Falkland Islands previously used Stanley Mean Time (UTC−03:51:24) until 11 March 1912, when Falkland Islands Time (FKT, UTC−04:00) came into effect. FKT was then used all year round until 25 September 1983, when Falkland Islands Summer Time (FKST, UTC−03:00) was first introduced for the summer period of the year. FKT was then used in the winter period (April–September) and FKST in the summer period (September–April) until April 2011, when the Falkland Islands Government decided not to put the clocks back and remain on daylight saving time all year around in the hope of gaining more time to contact the United Kingdom and Europe during the day, and lighter evenings in the winter.
