= Falkland Islands Government Aviation Service =

Airline based at Port Stanley Airport, Falkland Islands

Falkland Islands Government Air Service
- Founded: 1948; 78 years ago
- Hubs: Port Stanley Airport
- Fleet size: 5 fixed-wing aircraft
- Parent company: Falkland Islands Government
- Headquarters: Stanley, Falkland Islands
- Key people: Shaun Minto (General Manager 2008-2010)
- Website: https://www.falklands.gov.fk/aviationservice/

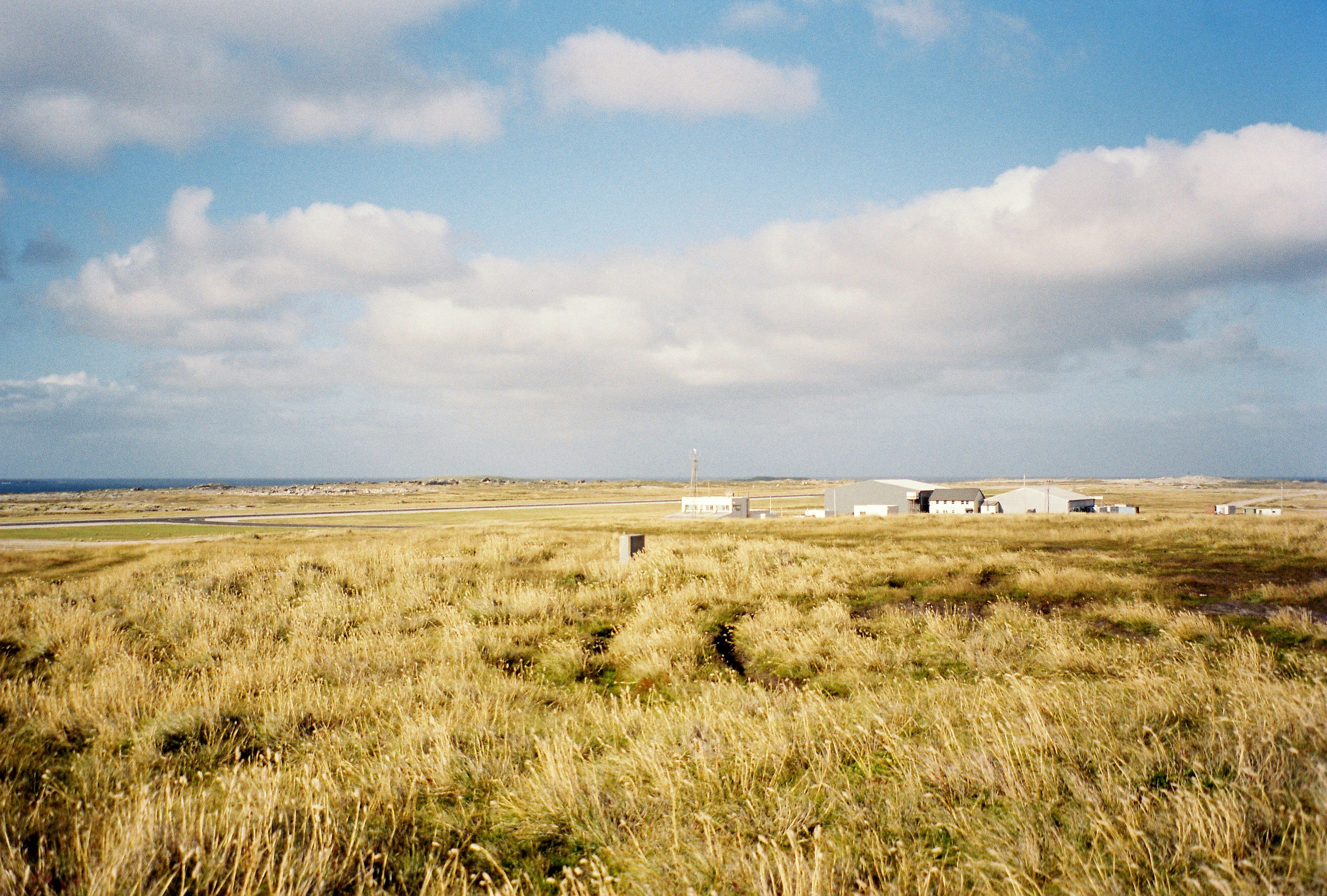
Port Stanley Airport.

Falkland Islands Government Air Service (FIGAS) is a small domestic airline based at Port Stanley Airport in the Falkland Islands. It operates unscheduled passenger services throughout the Falkland Islands. It also undertakes aerial surveillance of the exclusive economic zone (EEZ) surrounding the islands.

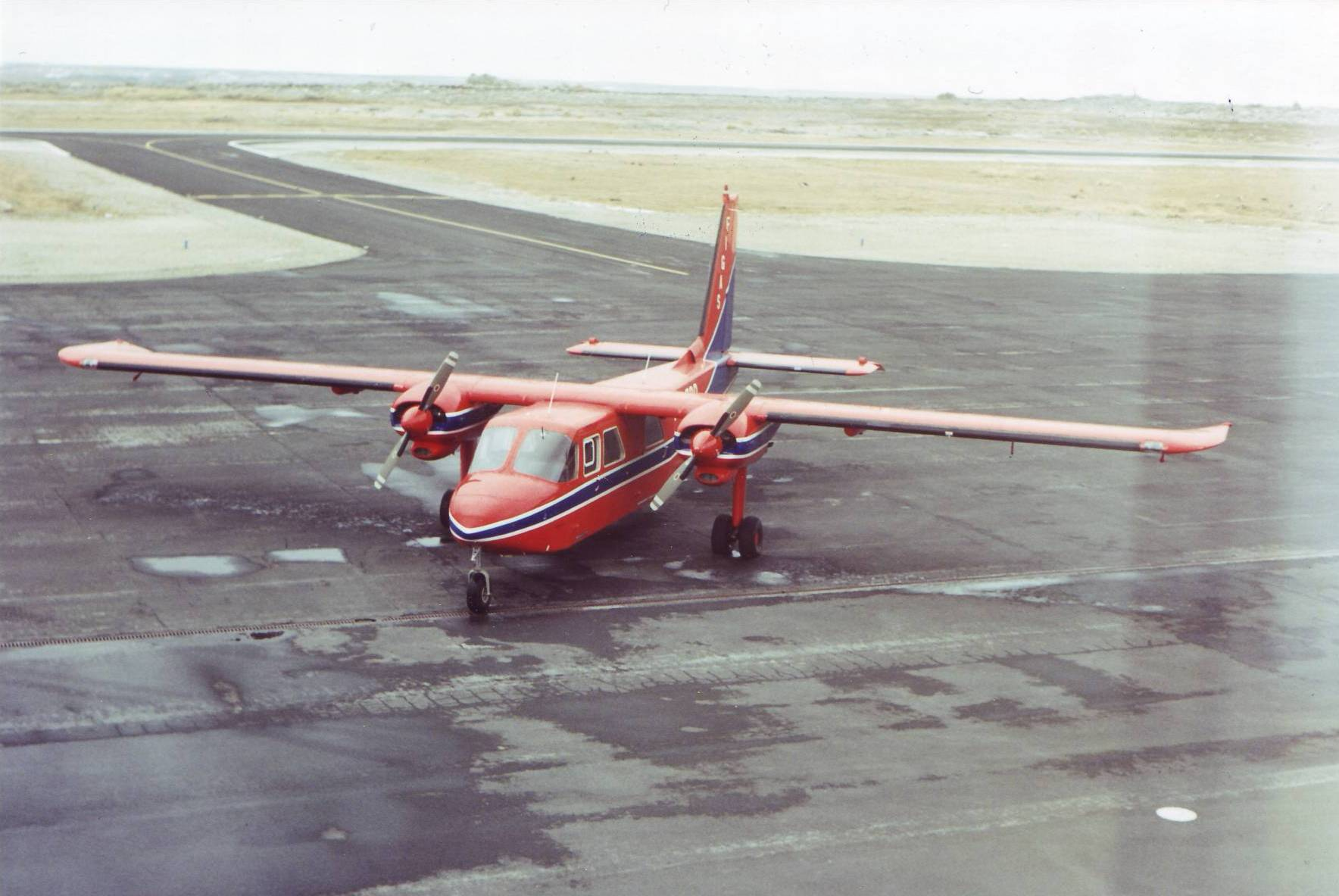
Britten-Norman Islander, 1994.

== History ==
Civil air services in the Falkland Islands began in 1948; 78 years ago, when the Falkland Islands Government purchased two Auster Mark V light aircraft to improve communications with, and to provide air ambulance services for, outlying communities on the Islands to compensate for the poor road networks on the Islands. The first operational flight was on 24 December 1948, when one of the Austers was used to fly a girl suffering from peritonitis from North Arm settlement to Port Stanley for hospital treatment. The two Austers were supplemented by a third Auster and a Noorduyn Norseman, both configured as floatplanes in 1950. By 1951, the service began to be referred to as the 'Falklands Islands Government Air Service' or FIGAS. Duties included air ambulance, carrying mail, carrying Government officials and fare-paying passengers and freight.

In 1953, FIGAS received its first de Havilland Canada DHC-2 Beaver aircraft. The Beaver became the mainstay of FIGAS's operations and the only type operated from 1956 to 1979, with a total of seven Beavers, all floatplanes, purchased, although only two were ever operated at any one time. In 1979, it chose the Britten-Norman Islander, to be flown as landplanes from the numerous grass airstrips on the Islands to replace the Beaver, purchasing its first Islander that year.

In April 1982, the Falkland Islands were invaded by Argentina. FIGAS's aircraft were seized by Argentine forces, and were damaged beyond repair by British air and artillery bombardment during the campaign to retake the Falklands, leaving FIGAS without aircraft. An ex-Argentine Army Aviation Bell UH-1 Huey helicopter was briefly operated by FIGAS after the war, but the poor condition of the helicopter and the high cost to certify the Huey as a civil aircraft and operate it resulted in plans to continue using the helicopter being abandoned.

FIGAS purchased another Beaver late in 1982, and two Islanders in 1983, allowing operations to be restarted. The Beaver was retired in 1985, with a third Islander acquired in 1986, another in 1987 and another in 1989. Two more, one equipped for fisheries patrol missions, were received in 1990, with its latest Islander purchased in 1992. The fleet then totalled five, having sold one and had two damaged beyond repair.

Another aircraft was severely damaged in 2018. In 2019, FIGAS ordered two new Islanders, one for delivery in 2019 and the second in 2020.

== Fleet ==
FIGAS operates five Britten-Norman BN-2 Islanders. Four are used for passenger transport, and one is used for maritime patrol.

== Destinations ==
East Falklands

- Bleaker Island
- Darwin
- Douglas Station
- George Island
- Lively Island
- Mt Pleasant
- North Arm
- Port San Carlos
- Salvador Settlement
- San Carlos
- Sea Lion Island
- Speedwell Island
- Stanley
- Walker Creek

West Falklands

- Albemarle
- Beaver Island
- Carcass Island
- Chartres
- Dunnose Head
- Fox Bay
- Hill Cove
- New Island
- Pebble Island
- Port Edgar
- Port Howard
- Port Stephens
- Roy Cove
- Saunders Island
- Shallow Harbour
- Spring Point
- Weddell Island

== See also ==
- List of airports in the Falkland Islands
