= List of airports in the Falkland Islands =

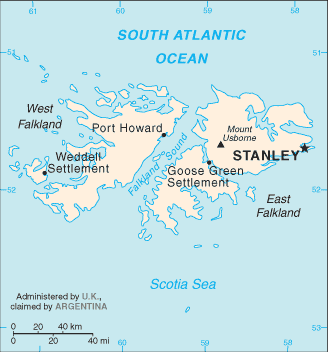
Map of the Falkland Islands

The Falkland Islands are an archipelago in the South Atlantic Ocean, located about 250 nautical miles (460 km; 290 mi) from the coast of mainland South America and 600 nautical miles (1,100 km; 690 mi) from mainland Antarctica. The archipelago, consisting of East Falkland, West Falkland and 776 lesser islands, is a self-governing Overseas Territory of the United Kingdom. The capital, Stanley, is on East Falkland. The islands contain two airports with paved runways, with settlements around the archipelago served by grass airstrips.

== Airports ==
Location served	ICAO	IATA	Airport name	Coordinates
Civil airports
Stanley	SFAL	PSY	Port Stanley Airport	51°41′10″S 57°46′39″W
Military airports
Mount Pleasant	EGYP	MPN	RAF Mount Pleasant (Royal Air Force base)	51°49′22″S 58°26′50″W

=== Other FIGAS airstrips ===
East Falkland:

- Bleaker Island
- Darwin
- Douglas Station (51°27′36″S 58°36′48″W)
- George Island (52°20′59″S 59°45′35″W)
- Goose Green (51°49′12″S 58°58′54″W)
- Lively Island (51°59′43″S 58°27′40″W)
- North Arm (52°7′25″S 59°22′14″W)
- Port San Carlos (51°30′06″S 59°00′16″W)
- Salvador (51°26′9″S 58°22′37″W)
- Sea Lion Island (52°25′39″S 59°4′42″W)
- Speedwell Island

West Falkland:

- Albemarle
- Beaver Island (51°50′25″S 61°13′59″W)
- Carcass Island (51°15′51″S 60°35′27″W)
- Chartres
- Dunnose Head (51°45′12″S 60°24′59″W)
- Fox Bay (51°56′3″S 60°3′48″W)
- Hill Cove (51°30′18″S 60°8′43″W)
- New Island (51°44′46″S 61°16′54″W)
- Pebble Island (51°18′33″S 59°36′35″W)
- Port Edgar (52°5′26″S 60°16′57″W)
- Port Howard (51°36′48″S 59°30′59″W)
- Port Stephens (52°5′44″S 60°51′4″W)
- Roy Cove (51°32′23″S 60°21′22″W)
- Saunders Island
- Shallow Harbour (51°45′20″S 60°32′9″W)
- Spring Point (51°49′47″S 60°27′11″W)
- Weddell Island (51°52′33″S 60°54′23″W)
- West Point Island (51°20′44″S 60°41′3″W)

They are in general 500–700 metres (1,600–2,300 ft) long

== See also ==
- Transport in the Falkland Islands
- List of airports by ICAO code: S#SF - Falkland Islands
- List of airports in the United Kingdom and the British Crown Dependencies
- Wikipedia: WikiProject Aviation/Airline destination lists: South America#Falkland Islands (United Kingdom)
