= Port Stanley Airport =

Civilian airport at Port Stanley, Falkland Islands

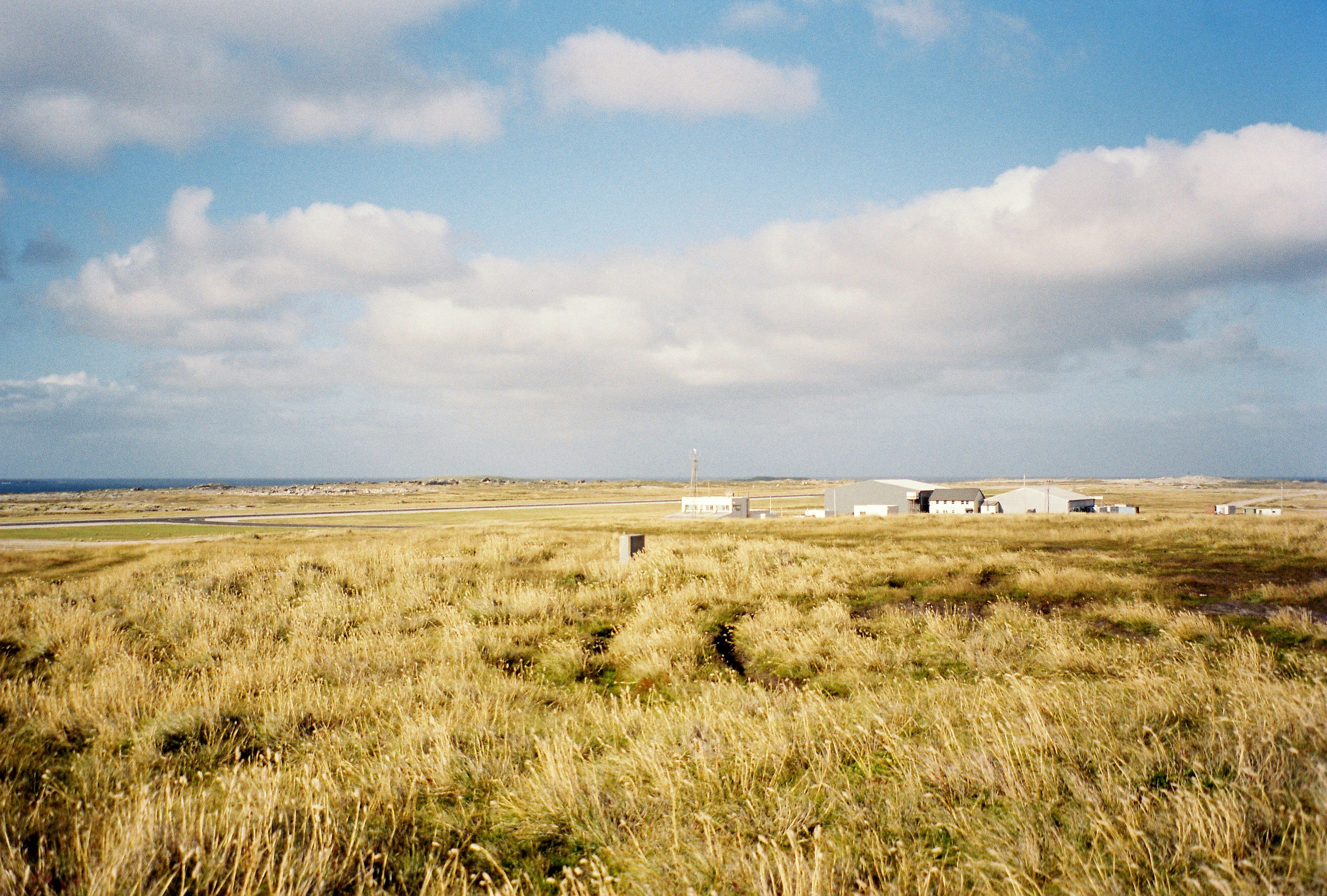
- IATA: PSY; ICAO: SFAL

Summary
- Airport type: public
- Owner: Falkland Islands Government
- Operator: Falkland Islands Government Air Service
- Location: Stanley, Falkland Islands
- Opened: 1 May 1979
- Time zone: Falkland Islands Standard Time (UTC−03:00)
- Elevation AMSL: 23 m (75 ft)
- Coordinates: 51°41′08″S 57°46′39″W

Map
- Location within Falkland Islands

Runways
Direction	Length		Surface
Direction	m	ft	Surface
09/27	918	3,013	asphalt
18/36	338	1,110	asphalt

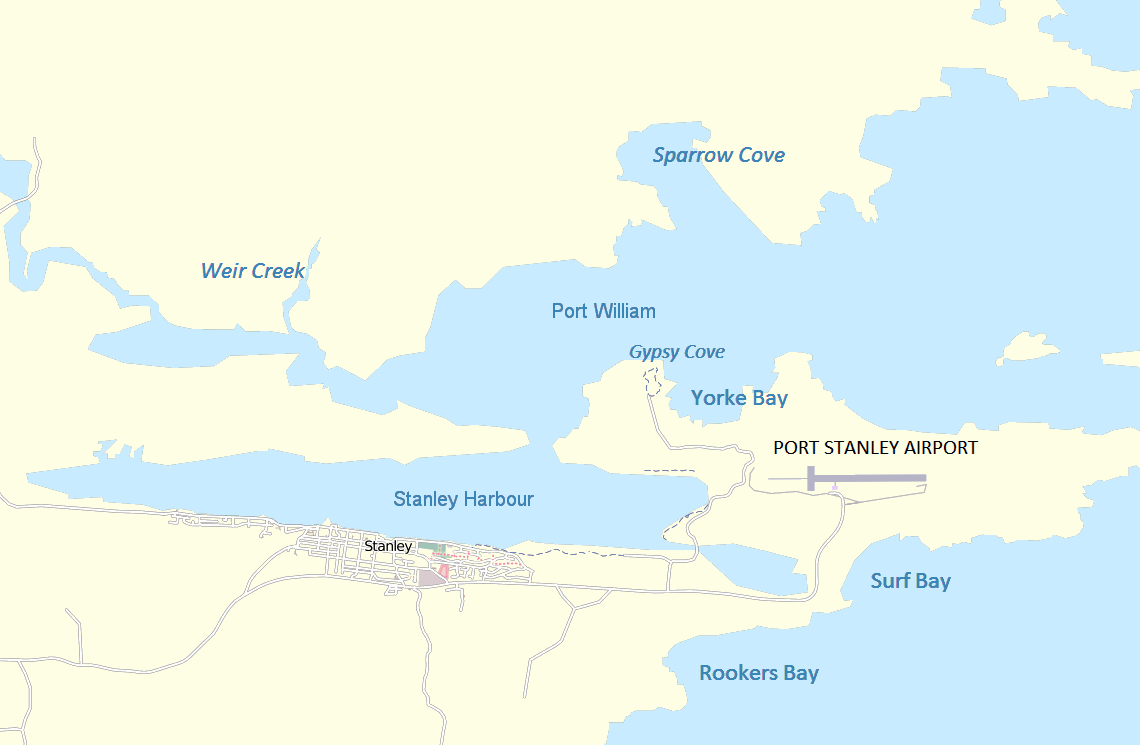
Map showing the airport and surrounding area.

Port Stanley Airport (IATA: PSY, ICAO: SFAL), also known as Stanley Airport, is a small civil airport in the Falkland Islands, two miles (3 kilometres) from the capital, Stanley. The airport is the only civilian airport in the islands with a paved runway. The military airbase at RAF Mount Pleasant, located to the west of Stanley, functions as the islands' international airport, because it has a longer runway capable of handling wide-body aircraft, and allows civilian flights by prior permission from the UK Ministry of Defence (MoD). Port Stanley Airport is owned by the Government of the Falkland Islands, operated by the Falkland Islands Government Air Service (commonly known by its abbreviation FIGAS), and is used for internal flights between the islands and flights between the Falklands and Antarctica. It has two asphalt-paved runways; its main runway 09/27 is 918 by 19 metres (3,012 by 62 feet), and its secondary runway 18/36 is 338 metres (1,109 feet) long.

== History ==
Prior to 1972, there was no airport in the Falkland Islands with a paved (sealed) runway, and all passenger movements to the islands had to be undertaken by boat. In the early 1970s, the Falkland Islands Company decided to withdraw its monthly supply ship to Montevideo, Uruguay, increasing the need for an air-link to the South American mainland.

In 1971, the Argentine Air Force broke the islands' isolation, starting with amphibious flights from Comodoro Rivadavia with Grumman HU-16B Albatross aircraft operated by LADE.

In 1973, the United Kingdom signed a Communications Agreement with Argentina for funding an airstrip on the islands. Flights took place again from Comodoro Rivadavia, this time with Fokker F-28 twin jet aircraft. This service was maintained until 1982, representing the only connection to the islands. At first, these flights landed at a temporary airstrip at Hookers Point at the east end of Port Stanley, where the runway was constructed of Marston Mat (also known as pierced steel planking or PSP). This situation continued until 1978, when a storm tore up large areas of the PSP runway, rendering it unusable. By this time however, a permanent solution was in hand, and on 1 May 1979, a new airport was opened at Cape Pembroke by Sir Vivian Fuchs with a 4,000-foot (1,200 m) paved runway. It immediately became home to the Falkland Islands Government Air Service (FIGAS) with its Britten-Norman Islanders and de Havilland Canada DHC-2 Beavers.

=== Falklands War ===
During the Falklands War of 1982, invading Argentine forces occupied Port Stanley Airport. The Argentine Air Force were unable to station their most advanced fighter jets at the base, given the relatively short runway, and the risk of attack by the British. However, several air force FMA IA 58 Pucarás, together with Argentine Navy Aermacchi MB-339 and T-34 Mentor for close air support and air reconnaissance were based at the airport. The Pucarás were deployed against the British land forces, shooting down a Westland Scout; and the Aermacchis against the British Fleet.

On 1 May 1982, the Royal Air Force (RAF) bombed the airport in Operation Black Buck, and several additional raids were carried out by embarked Sea Harriers. Throughout the conflict, the airport installations were attacked with 237 bombs, 1,200 shells by deployed Royal Navy ships, and sixteen missiles. The forty-two 1,000 pounds (450 kilograms) bombs dropped by the two Black Buck missions left twin strings of craters which are still visible on satellite photos of the airport today. However, none of these attacks ever put the airfield out of action entirely, and even both Black Buck raids only managed to score one direct hit on the runway, which was repaired sufficiently to allow for Lockheed C-130 Hercules, Lockheed L-188 Electra, and Fokker F-28 transport aircraft to resume night supply flights within 48 hours. These flights continued to bring supplies, weapons, vehicles, and fuel, and airlift out the wounded until the end of the conflict. The Argentines left the runway covered with piles of earth during the day, in an attempt to mislead the British regarding the condition of the airfield. In fact, the British were well aware that C-130 flights continued to use the airfield, and attempted to interdict these flights leading to the loss of one C-130 on 1 June, which was not, however, engaged in any resupply mission.

During the war, the Argentines also mined Yorke Bay to the north of the airport and Surf / Rookery Bays to the south-east with minimum metal mines; under the presumption the British would attempt an amphibious landing on the east coast of East Falkland to quickly recapture both the airfield and Stanley in one fell swoop. However, these minefields proved unnecessary when the British opted instead to land at San Carlos on the west coast of East Falkland, and attack overland towards Stanley. The beaches surrounding Port Stanley Airport remained heavily mined long after the war, as demining had been deemed impractical due to the constantly drifting sand dunes, and the disruption that would be done to the breeding colonies of the threatened Magellanic penguin, which continued to thrive on the beaches (being too light to set off the mines). However, the UK eventually commenced these operations in 2009 to comply with the Ottawa Treaty. On 14 November 2020, the island was declared free of landmines.

=== Post conflict ===
After the war, the Royal Air Force (RAF) remained in the Falkland Islands, and took over the airport, renaming it RAF Stanley. Immediately after the conflict, air defence of the islands and garrison was carried out by Royal Navy Sea Harrier FRS.1 and RAF Harrier GR.3 at RAF Stanley and from the aircraft carrier, HMS Invincible, on standing patrol. The runway was extended to 6,100 feet (1,900 metres), paved with aluminium planking, and had arrester equipment installed to allow RAF F-4M Phantom fighters, initially some of those of No. 29 Squadron RAF, to be based on the island as air defence. The unit was known as 'PhanDet' until 1 April 1983, when the detachment achieved squadron status following the rundown of No. 23 Squadron RAF in the UK, and the resultant transfer of its 'nameplate' from RAF Wattisham to the RAF Stanley unit. The Harrier detachment was renamed No. 1453 Flight, and remained at RAF Stanley to provide standby air defence, in event of excessive crosswinds, until RAF Mount Pleasant was opened in 1985. In addition, long range Lockheed C-130 Hercules transport aircraft of No. 1312 Flight, resident at RAF Stanley, provided tanker support for the Phantom fighters, and transport for local (South Georgia) tasks. The airport was also used by the C-130s of the 'air bridge' from Ascension Island for trooping, cargo, and many other essentials until RAF Mount Pleasant became operational.

In 1985, RAF Mount Pleasant opened, and in April 1986, Port Stanley Airport returned to civilian use. The temporary aluminium planking runway extension was removed, bringing the main 09/27 runway down to its present length and width of 918 by 19 metres (3,012 by 62 feet). Although flights from Chile by regional airline Aerovias DAP did use the airport in the early 1990s, for the most part, external services have used RAF Mount Pleasant since it opened.

== Current status ==
Stanley Airport is used by internal flights and provides connections to British bases in Antarctica. The Falkland Islands Government Air Service (FIGAS) operates internal flights within the Falkland Islands from the airport with its five Britten-Norman BN-2B Islander fixed-wing aircraft. The British Antarctic Survey uses the airport for intercontinental flights to Rothera Research Station in Antarctica.

Bristow Helicopters has previously operated three Sikorsky S-92 helicopters from Stanley Airport, two for transporting oil rig workers to exploratory oil platforms in the North Falkland Basin, and the other as a search and rescue (SAR) helicopter. Occasionally, one of the aircraft had been based at RAF Mount Pleasant given lack of space at Stanley Airport. In 2015, Bristow added a new BVE helicopter hangar at Stanley Airport to house three S-92 helicopters. The hangar, designed and constructed by RUBB UK, is used both to service, maintain, and store the helicopters, as well as to support SAR operations and training.

== Destinations ==
=== FIGAS ===
East Falkland

- Bleaker Island
- Darwin
- Douglas Station
- George Island
- Lively Island
- Mount Pleasant
- North Arm
- Port San Carlos
- Salvador
- San Carlos
- Sea Lion Island
- Speedwell Island
- Walker Creek

West Falkland

- Carcass Island
- Chartres
- Dunnose Head
- Fox Bay
- Hill Cove
- Pebble Island
- Port Albemarle
- Port Edgar
- Port Howard
- Port Stevens
- Roy Cove
- Saunders Island
- Weddell Island

=== BAS ===
- Rothera, British Antarctic Territory
