= Rabbit Island, Falkland Islands =

Rabbit Island
- Island
- Rabbit Island shown within the Falkland Islands
- Coordinates: 51.5562°S 60.4957°W
- Country: Falkland Islands

Area
  - Total: 1.78 km^{2} (0.69 sq mi)
- Highest elevation: 91 m (299 ft)
- Time zone: UTC−3 (FKST)
- If shown, area and population ranks are for all islands and all inhabited islands in the Falklands respectively.

Rabbit Island is one of the Falkland Islands in the Hummock Island group. It is near West Falkland, to its west, at the mouth of King George Bay. With a land area of 0.69 square miles (1.78 km^{2}) it is the second largest of the three main islands in the bay, lying 2.8 miles (4.5 km) west of Hummock Island and Middle Island. It is east of the Passage Islands and south east of Split Island.

On three sides the island is roughly rectangular, but there is a long promontory extending to the south-east. The island has very steep slopes up to 61 metres (200 ft) to the north and west, but it slopes gently to the east. The highest points are about 91 metres (299 ft). It was heavily grazed by sheep in the past and there is an old shanty in the valley. Rats have been confirmed on the island.
