= Split Island, Falkland Islands =

Split Island
- Island
- Split Island shown within the Falkland Islands
- Coordinates: 51.474°S 60.710°W
- Country: Falkland Islands
- Time zone: UTC−3 (FKST)
- If shown, area and population ranks are for all islands and all inhabited islands in the Falklands respectively.

Split Island is one of the Falkland Islands. It is near West Falkland, to its west, at the mouth of King George Bay. It is to the west of Rabbit Island, Hummock Island and Middle Island. It is north of the Passage Islands and south east of Westpoint Island, and south west of the Byron Heights and Storm Mountain.
