= Disappearance of Royal Marine Alan Addis =

British disappearance case

Alan Addis
- Born: 14 July 1961; Croydon, Surrey, England
- Disappeared: 8 August 1980 (aged 19); North Arm, Lafonia, East Falkland
- Status: Missing for 46 years, 2 months and 6 days
- Occupation: Royal Marine
- Employer: Royal Navy
- Known for: Unsolved disappearance
- Partner: None
- Children: None
- Parent: Ann Addis

Disappearance of Royal Marine Alan Addis
- Military career
- Allegiance: United Kingdom
- Branch: Royal Navy
- Service years: 1979-1980 (disappearance)
- Rank: Marine
- Units: Naval Party 8901, Royal Marines

Alan Addis (born 14 July 1961) was a British serviceman who disappeared in mysterious circumstances in August 1980 while serving with the Royal Marines in the Falkland Islands. It was initially suggested that Addis had drowned in an accident, but it is now widely believed that he was murdered. Police investigations have resulted in arrests, but no one has ever been charged in connection with his disappearance and his body has never been found.

== Background ==
Alan Addis was a member of Naval Party 8901, a Royal Marines unit which in 1966 was assigned to the Falklands, to be rotated yearly. Led by a Major, the unit's role was to maintain a strategic tripwire military presence on the islands and to provide military and civil defence training for the Falkland Islands Defence Force (FIDF), consisting of 120 volunteers spaced throughout the island and its various settlements. Addis's platoon which consisted of 42 men, split into five-to-eight-man sections (each led by a corporal or a lieutenant), was based at Moody Brook Barracks, six miles west of the capital of Stanley.

== Disappearance ==
At the time of his disappearance, Addis was part of a three-man team that had journeyed to the remote settlement of North Arm in Lafonia on East Falkland, approximately 90 miles (140 km) from Stanley, to pick up three other Royal Marines and the equipment for an FIDF unit in North Arm, after a week long training. After that, they were to head to Fitzroy in order to train FIDF volunteers over there.

On the evening of 8 August, Addis and the other marines attended a function in the village hall (which doubled as a social club) alongside forty locals. The marines left the event at different times in ones and twos to various local homes, and Addis's colleagues reported last seeing him at around 1:30 am. The following morning the rest of the team began the journey back to Stanley on the steamer MV Forrest. Thirty minutes after they had set sail, Addis was noted to be missing.

The initial view was that Addis had either fallen overboard or mistakenly stepped off a jetty into the cold waters of the South Atlantic in the Bay of Harbours. His mother, Anne Addis, was contacted at her home in England with the news that Alan was missing on patrol. On the following day, police visited her to inform her that her son was presumed drowned in an accident. Over the next few weeks, other possible explanations were put forward, including a suggestion that Addis had become disoriented and wandered off into the Falklands hinterland, possibly succumbing to hypothermia. An air and sea search of the islands and the waters around them (including an underwater search by divers) failed to find any trace of the missing marine and was eventually called off. Later that year, an inquest on the Falklands returned an open verdict.

== Military investigation ==
In November 1981, Anne Addis travelled to the Falklands by military transport to make enquiries of her own. She became convinced that foul play was involved and asked the Ministry of Defence to initiate a new investigation led by the Special Investigation Branch (SIB) of the Royal Military Police. She argued that the SIB were better equipped – in terms of personnel, training and experience – to undertake such an inquiry, than the islands' own tiny police force which then consisted of one full-time and a handful of part-time constables. In response, an SIB officer was dispatched to the Falklands, though his eventual report was confidential and Mrs Addis was not given sight of it.

The situation was further complicated in April the following year when Argentine forces invaded and occupied the islands. The subsequent conflict between the United Kingdom and Argentina, known as the Falklands War, saw British forces retake the islands and the Argentines surrendering on 14 June 1982. During the course of the conflict the local police files on the Addis case were lost, possibly destroyed deliberately by the Falklands authorities to prevent information about British military deployments on the islands from falling into Argentine hands.

== Investigations 1993–1995 ==
In the years following the war, Mrs Addis continued to pressure British and Falklands authorities for a new inquiry and remained in contact with a number of Falklanders. In 1993 rumours reached her of an overheard conversation in a Falklands pub where an islander allegedly boasted of their involvement in Alan's murder. This information was passed to the now reformed, enlarged and renamed Royal Falkland Islands Police (RFIP). By that time, the RFIP had re-opened their investigation and were able to discount that particular rumour. They did nevertheless conclude that Addis had been murdered and identified four local islanders as prime suspects.

In 1995, having reached an impasse, the RFIP passed the enquiry to Devon and Cornwall Police, and a team of detectives flew out from the UK. In September of that year, in an operation involving Chinook helicopters from the Royal Air Force base at RAF Mount Pleasant, officers from the Devon and Cornwall Police and the RFIP arrested four Falklands men. The men were later released without charge.

== "Bodyhunters" documentary ==
In 1997, an attempt was made to locate Addis's body by a specialist UK team. The group included Professor John Hunter a forensic archaeologist at the University of Birmingham and head of the highly regarded Forensic Search and Advisory group (set up to advise and assist police in locating human remains). The team also included experts with ground penetrating radar and a specially trained sniffer dog from Lancashire Police led by Sergeant Mick Swindells. Despite searching over 54 locations, the team found no trace of Addis. The investigation was filmed by the television production company Lion Films for a documentary programme screened on British television in 1998 as part of the Channel 4 series Equinox.

The programme followed the team's efforts to identify the location of Addis's remains and recorded interviews with his mother, his former comrades and a number of Falklanders. It included interviews with two of the men arrested following the earlier inquiry in 1995. Both men flatly denied any involvement in Addis's disappearance. The programme considered a number of persistent rumours that had been circulating over the years. The first of these was that Addis had been murdered because he had been found in flagrante delicto with the wife of a local landowner, who was interviewed by the programme makers and dismissed the suggestion, though he admitted being aware of such a story. The second rumour concerned the death of a local shepherd, Johnny Biggs, killed in a fire at a North Arm bunkhouse some two weeks after Addis's disappearance. In the programme Falklanders voiced their suspicions that the man had not actually died in the fire, but had been murdered and the fire started deliberately to conceal this. The fact that his death had occurred shortly before he was allegedly due to give evidence to the Board of Inquiry, together with alleged shortcomings in the fire investigation, were cited as indicating a potential link with the Addis case. According to the programme, there was local speculation that the man had been killed to prevent him giving evidence because he had information about Addis's fate, possibly through being privy to a conversation that implicated another islander in the disappearance.

== Metropolitan Police investigation ==
In December 2010, a Metropolitan Police team visited the Falklands to conduct a further search. This followed a tip-off from a former Falklands resident who had contacted Anne Addis with information on where Alan's body was buried. Although no body was found, it was reported that the search had turned up new clues and that a follow-up visit to the islands was planned. It was further reported that the head of the RFIP had taken the unusual step of offering police protection to anyone prepared to come forward with information.

== 2018 Forces TV documentary ==
Starting in June 2018, the YouTube channel of the British Forces Broadcasting Service began uploading (in 1/4 parts) a 46-minute documentary on the subject of Addis's early life and eventual disappearance. The film's producers in particular spoke with several of the specialists who had participated in the 1998 Equinox programme. Most of those interviewed – specialists, former police, civilian, and ex-military acquaintances alike – shared the opinion that Addis had been murdered.

With most islanders working either for the local civil service, the Falkland Islands Company, or British absentee landlords, later rumours mentioned an unofficial town chief with two "strongmen" who enforced his will, thus making him a force to be dealt with in the community. Additionally, several of the aforementioned interviewees expressed their view that Addis had been murdered without premeditation in a fight over a woman, after which the body was allegedly transported out of the settlement.

== Memorials ==
A memorial plaque commemorating Alan Addis is on display in Christ Church Cathedral in Stanley. Anne Addis established a memorial fund in honour of her son, but in May 2010 she announced that she was to wind this up and donate the monies raised to the Help for Heroes fund for British servicemen.

== Media ==
In 2022, broadcaster Marcel Theroux, brother of Louis Theroux, presented a documentary, Falklands: Island of Secrets for ITV, looking into the disappearance of Alan Addis.

== See also ==
- List of people who disappeared mysteriously at sea
