= Rincon Grande =

Settlement on East Falkland

- Location within Falkland Islands Location within South America
- Coordinates: 51.4615°S 58.3093°W

Population (2018)
  - Total: 4

Rincon or Rincon Grande is a settlement on East Falkland, in the Falkland Islands, on the east shore of Salvador Water, at its north end. The settlement is 42 miles (68 km) north of Stanley.

== Name ==
Rincon refers to a point of land, and such early settlements were often started where cattle could be herded onto boats. It is east of Salvador across the water, and west of Port Louis and Johnson's Harbour. It is one of the oldest settlements in the area.

The name Rincon Grande is also a name associated with a barrio in Rincón, Puerto Rico and tourist areas near San José, Costa Rica, often meaning "large corner" in Spanish. Nearby is Armantine Beach and Wreck Mountain, both named after a French ship, the Armantine that was wrecked here.

== History ==
Originally settled and developed by Andrez Pitaluga in April 1864 for £5 and it covered 6,000 acres (2,400 ha). The sheep farming estate still belongs to the Pitaluga family who had 13,700 sheep in the early 1940s, 10,000 in the 1950s, 8,400 in the 1970s, and 4,900 sheep in 2018. Pitaluga also founded Salvador settlement across the water, and this was also known as Gibraltar, as that is where Pitaluga was from.

In 1957, the R. R. S Shackleton called at Rincon Grande to load 730 live sheep for transporting to the whaling stations on South Georgia; the three-day sail to South Georgia was in rough seas, and the crew spent all their time attending to the upset sheep.

== Population ==
In 1995, the number of registered voters in the settlement was five; in 2018, the total number of people living there was four.

== Falklands Conflict ==
Rincon Grande escaped much of the effects of the Falklands Conflict, although Robin Pitaluga intercepted a radio message from the British asking about the possibility of an Argentine surrender. When he reported this to the Argentines, he was taken away to Stanley for questioning where he was "treated badly".
