= Fox Island, Falkland Islands =

Fox Island
- Island
- Fox Island shown within the Falkland Islands
- Coordinates: 51.840°S 60.488°W
- Country: Falkland Islands
- Time zone: UTC−3 (FKST)
- If shown, area and population ranks are for all islands and all inhabited islands in the Falklands respectively.

Fox Island is one of the Falkland Islands. It is near West Falkland, to its west, near Spring Point and Dunnose Head in Queen Charlotte Bay.
