= Charles Barnard (castaway) =

British castaway (c. 1781–1860)

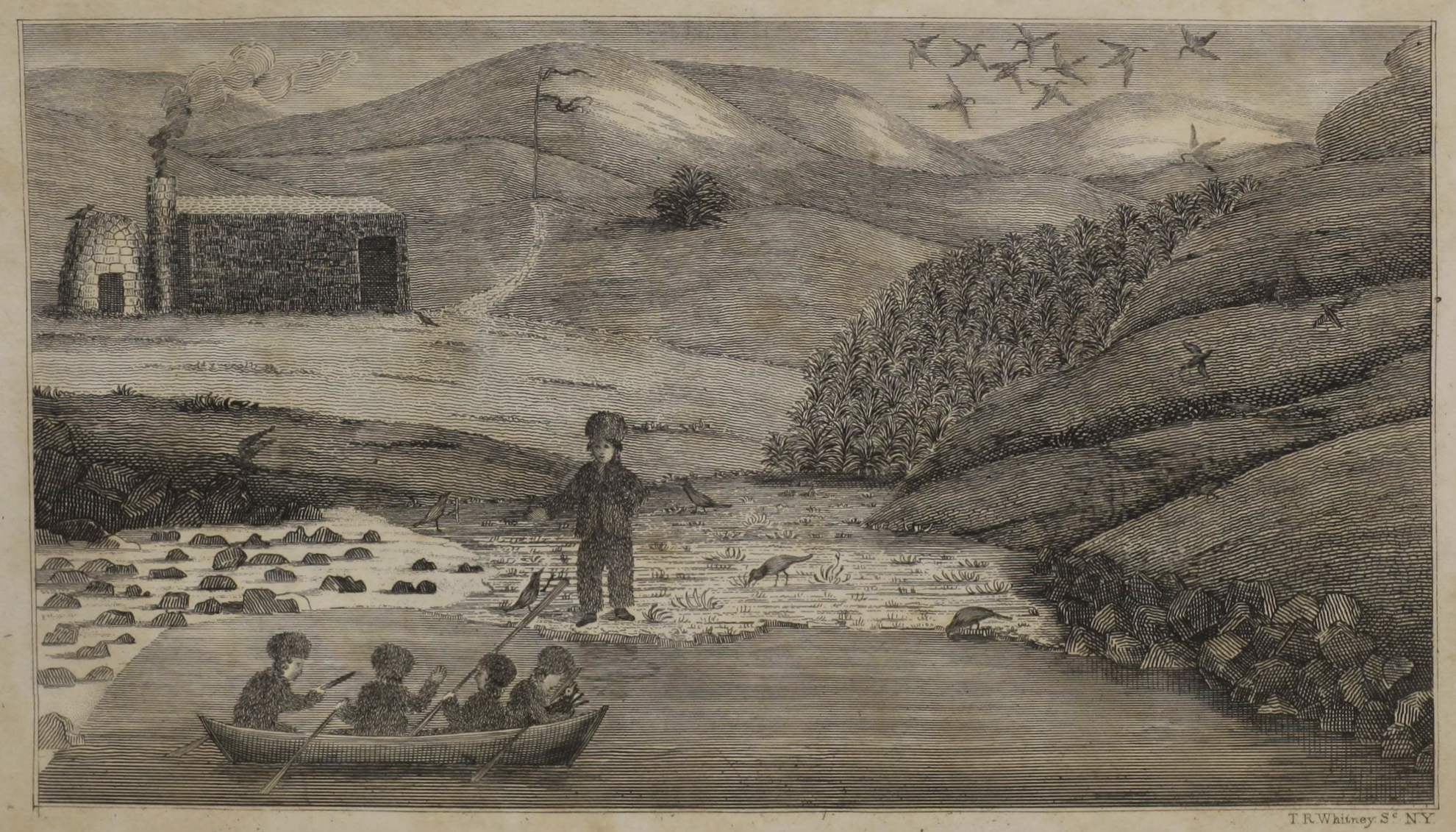
Return of the author's companions (1829 engraving after the sketch by C. H. Barnard, 1813 or 1814, Barnard depicted standing on the beach)

Captain Charles Barnard (c. 1781 – c. 1860) was a castaway.

In 1812, the British ship Isabella, captained by George Higton, was shipwrecked off Eagle Island (part of the Falkland Islands). Most of the crew were rescued by the American sealer Nanina, which was built and operated out of the whaling port city of Hudson, New York, and commanded by Captain Charles Barnard. Barnard, realizing that the castaways were unaware of the War of 1812, informed the survivors that they were at war with each other, but agreed to rescue them. Realizing that he would require more provisions for the expanded number of passengers, Barnard and a few others went out in a party to hunt for meat on the nearby New Island. During his absence, the British seized Nanina and left Barnard and his men on New Island. Barnard and his party were finally rescued by the British whalers Asp and Indispensable in November 1814. He later continued his career as a sealer and captain of the Charity in the South Shetlands in 1820–21. In 1829, Barnard wrote A Narrative of the Sufferings and Adventures of Capt. Charles Barnard detailing his life as a castaway.

== Voyage preparation ==
Charles Barnard made an agreement with Messrs. John B. Murray and Son about a sealing expedition. The agreement stated that the company would buy a vessel that Barnard approved of, fit the ship with the necessary equipment, and fully stock the ship. It also stated that the company was to receive 52% of all the proceeds from the skins and oils produced, and Barnard would receive the other 48%. Messrs. Murrays purchased the brig Nanina, fitted her, and filled her with supplies and provisions. Barnard's plan for sealing was upon first arriving to get as many seal skins as possible, and then have Nanina sail back to New York, while Barnard and other crewmates would stay on the island. There they would continue to hunt seals while the ship sold the skins and oil and resupplied. Barnard chose Messrs, Fanning, Hunter, and Pease to stay on the island with him when the ship left, and chose his father to sail Nanina to New York and back.

== Voyage ==
Nanina's cargo was ready for her voyage on April 6, 1812. During the same day, Barnard had received information that Congress had passed an embargo on all vessels in the United States's harbours and waters. If the Collector of the port of New York was to receive official instructions from Washington, Barnard's voyage would not be allowed, which prompted him to go to Sandy Hook until the 12th. When the entire crew had arrived, Nanina departed and headed towards the Cape Verde Islands to gather salt for curing the seal skins and water. The crew consisted of Valentine Barnard (Charles Barnard's father), Edmund Fanning, Bazilla Pease, Henry Ingham, mate; John Wines, carpenter; Havens Tenant, Jacob Green, Henry Gilchrist, Andrew Lott, William Seaman, steward; and John Spear, cook. Nanina arrived at Bonavista Island after sailing for 35 days, and gathered salt, resupplied the hold, and brought a large supply of hogs, goats, fowls, and vegetables. From there, the ship sailed to St. Jago and then sailed to the Falkland Islands. Several gales prevented the ship from sailing to the Falkland Islands until September 7, where Nanina anchored in Hooker's Harbor, New Island, at 2 P.M.

== Arrival ==
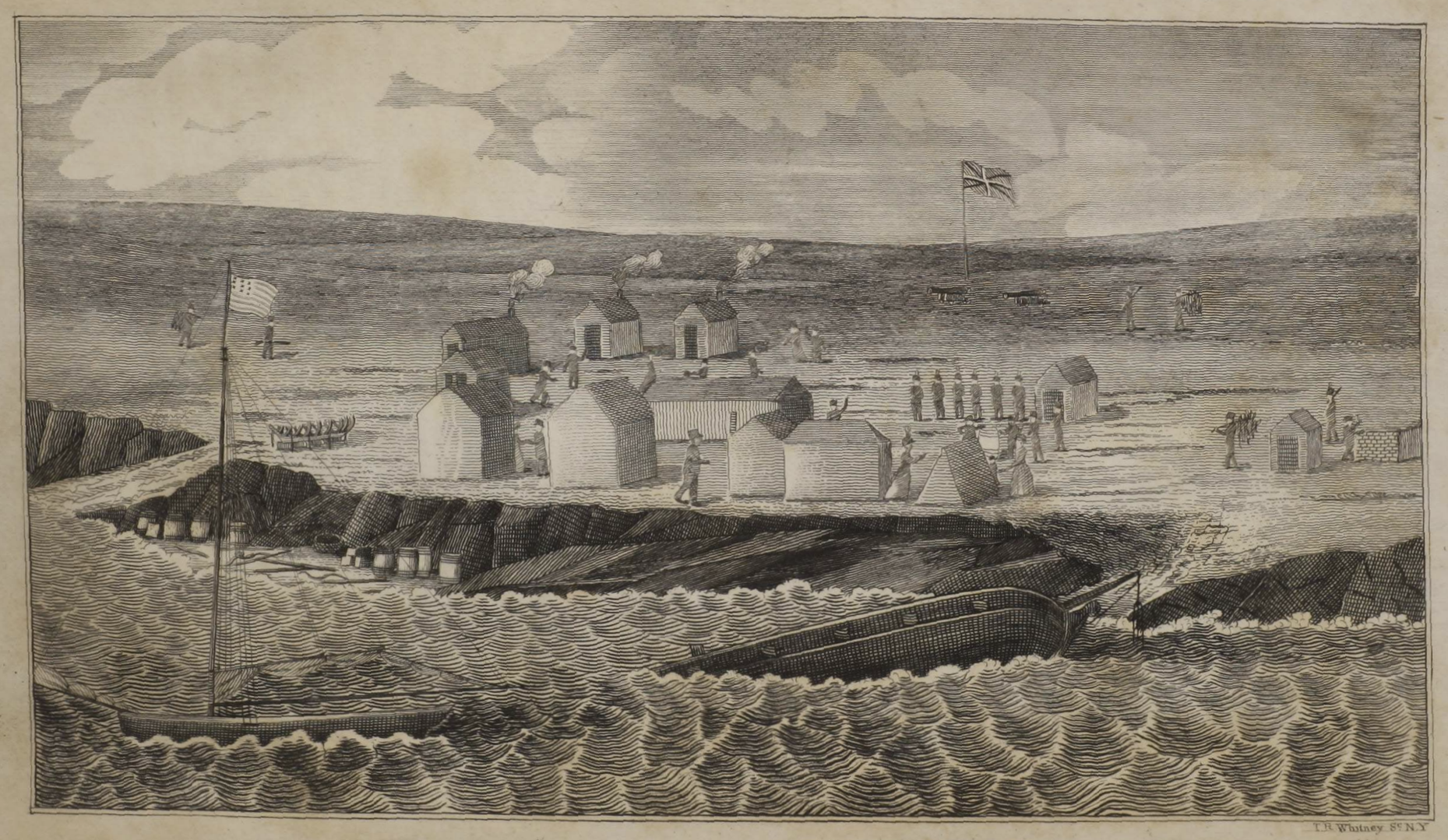
View of the wreck of the British ship Isabella (1813)

Upon arriving, the crew started unloading yards, topmasts, etc. and started making shallops on shore. These were made to allow the men to cruise among the islands in pursuit of seals. The first shallop to be launched was called “The young Nanina.” With the shallop, Barnard and 10 others went to Jason Islands, which was 30 miles from the brig. There, Barnard left 9 people on the island with enough supplies for them to last 6 weeks on the island. On January 3, a ship, Hope, had arrived and informed Barnard that the United States had declared war against Great Britain, it also brought several letters from family and friends, and one letter was from Messrs. John B. Murray and Son. The letter told Barnard that the company advised Barnard to return with the vessel to the United States and that the agreement would be rendered null and void because New Island was frequently visited by English whalers, who could easily destroy the Nanina. Barnard retrieved his crew from Jason Islands and moved Nanina to a harbour in the English Maloon. This harbor, long known as Barnard's Harbour and now known as Carew Harbour, was inland and provided security from gales or capture. The harbour was formed at the mouth of a small lagoon on the west side of the English Maloon. It was located twenty miles east of Canton Harbour, Swan Island, and forty miles south from New Island. The entrance is protected by four small islands, and its sides by vast and lofty hills. At the harbour, the crew stripped the brig of all riggings and spars, which were put on the shore to be secured from the weather. Barnard's plan was to remain here for twelve months, at least, since the location was good for obtaining cargo and to wait until peace was proclaimed between the two countries, since conveying the cargo to the United States would be very risky. To accomplish this, Barnard changed the amount of bread per person to three and a half pounds, so that the food would last the entire time. While at anchor during the month of April in Fox Bay, on the Southeast side of the English Maloon, Barnard and the crew saw heavy columns of smoke rising in the direction of the Anacan Islands. At first, Barnard suspected them to be fires from Spaniards possibly from Buenos Ayres, on one of the Anacans, but upon further thinking, decided that it was most likely lit by shipwrecked mariners using it as a signal of distress. Barnard held a consultation with some of the crew and determined that they would immediately go to the Anacans. They first sailed from Fox Bay to Jack's Harbour, at the Northeastern end of Eagle Island. At the harbour, there were several reports of gunfire being heard, which were thought to be used as signs of distress.

== Honours ==
Barnard Point on Livingston Island in Antarctica is named after him.
