= HMS Glamorgan =

British guided missile destroyer, 1964–1986

Coordinates: 35°58′0″S 77°22′0″W

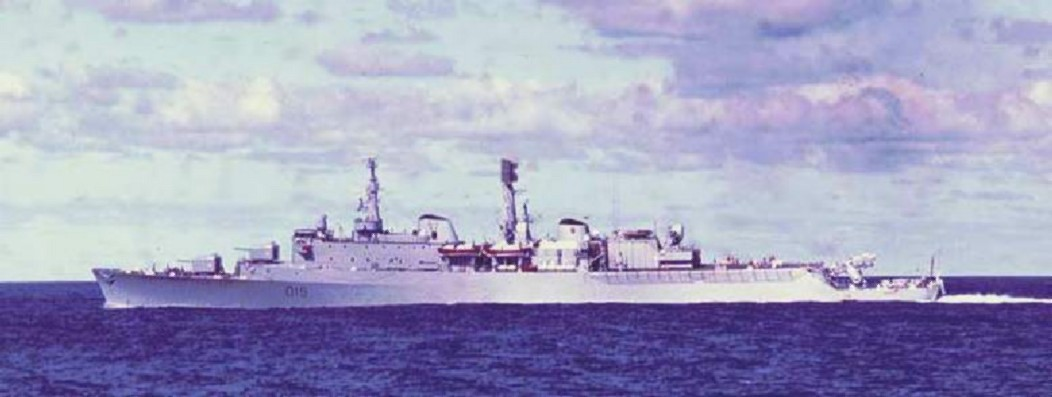
- HMS Glamorgan in 1972

History

United Kingdom
- Name: Glamorgan
- Builder: Vickers-Armstrongs
- Laid down: 13 September 1962
- Launched: 9 July 1964
- Commissioned: 14 October 1966
- Decommissioned: 1986
- Identification: Pennant number: D19
- Motto: I Fyny Bo'r Nod; (Welsh: "I Give Way To None")
- Fate: Sold to Chile in September 1986

Chile
- Name: Almirante Latorre
- Acquired: September 1986
- Commissioned: 1986
- Decommissioned: 1998
- Fate: Sunk at sea on 11 April 2005 on way to breakers

General characteristics
- Class & type: County-class destroyer
- Displacement: 6,200 long tons (6,300 t) (6,800 tons full load)
- Length: 520 ft (160 m)
- Beam: 53 ft (16 m)
- Draught: 20 ft 5 in (6.22 m)
- Propulsion: COSAG (Combined steam and gas), two sets of geared steam turbines and 4 G6 Gas Turbines producing 30,000 shp (22,000 kW), 2 shafts
- Speed: 30 knots (56 km/h) (maximum)
- Range: 4,000 nautical miles (7,400 km) at 28 knots (52 km/h)
- Capacity: 471
- Armament: 2× Fore-mounted twin-gunned turret with 4.5-inch (114 mm) guns Mark N6 (Batch 2's turret "B" was later replaced by 4× MM38 Exocet missile launchers); 4× MM40 Exocet missile launchers replacing turret "B" (since 1975); 2× mountings for Oerlikon 20 mm cannon; 1× Aft-mounted Seaslug GWS.2 SAM (24 missiles); 2× mountings (port & starboard) for Seacat GWS-22 SAM (In Chilean service, the Seacat was replaced by 2× 8-cell VLS for Barak SAM); 2× triple-tube launchers for shipborne torpedoes
- Aircraft carried: 1× Wessex HAS Mk 3 helicopter
- Aviation facilities: Flight deck and enclosed hangar for embarking one helicopter

HMS Glamorgan was a County-class destroyer of the Royal Navy with a displacement of 5,440 tonnes. The ship was built by Vickers-Armstrongs in Newcastle Upon Tyne and named after the Welsh county of Glamorgan.

She was launched on 9 July 1964, and was delivered to the Royal Navy two years later. in 1974, she was the subject of a refit, when 'B' turret was replaced by four Exocet launchers in an attempt to provide the Royal Navy, reduced by then to one strike carrier, HMS Ark Royal, with some surface fighting capability beyond the range of 4.5/6 inch guns. A much more expensive update, costing £63 million, fitted Glamorgan in 1977–1980 with a computerised C3 ADWAS system well in advance of its original fitting, but limited by the essential manual nature of the 4.5" turret and the ageing Seacat and Seaslug missiles.

In the spring and early summer of 1982 Glamorgan was involved in the Falklands War during which she engaged Argentine land forces and protected shipping. In the last days of the war, Argentine navy technicians fired a land-based MM-38 Exocet missile which struck the ship causing damage and killing 14 of her crew. She was refitted in late 1982 and her last active deployment for the Royal Navy was to the coast of Lebanon in 1984.

In 1986 Glamorgan was sold to the Chilean Navy, and renamed Almirante Latorre. The destroyer served for 12 years until late 1998. On 11 April 2005, she sank while under tow to be broken up.

== Construction and design ==
Two County-class guided-missile destroyers, Glamorgan and Fife were ordered as part of the Royal Navy's 1961–62 shipbuilding programme, as a follow-on to the existing four County-class destroyers ordered under the 1955–56 and 1956–57 programmes. They differed from the previous ships in being fitted with the revised Seaslug GWS2 missile system, which was expected to be much more effective than the earlier GWS1 system, and the use of the ADAWS combat data system to aid control of the ship's weapons.

Glamorgan was 521 feet 6 inches (158.95 m) long overall and 505 feet (153.92 m) between perpendiculars, with a beam of 54 feet (16.46 m) and a draught of 20 feet 6 inches (6.25 m). Displacement was 6,200 long tons (6,300 t) normal and 6,800 long tons (6,900 t) deep load. The ship was propelled by a combination of steam turbines and gas turbines in a Combined steam and gas (COSAG) arrangement, driving two propeller shafts. Each shaft could by driven by a single 15,000 shaft horsepower (11,000 kW) steam turbine (fed with steam at 700 pounds per square inch (4,800 kPa) and 700 °F (371 °C; 644 K)) from Babcock & Wilcox boilers) and two Metrovick G6 gas turbines (each rated at 7,500 shaft horsepower (5,600 kW)), with the gas turbines being used for high speeds and to allow a quick departure from ports without waiting for steam to be raised. Maximum speed was 30 knots (35 mph; 56 km/h) and the ship had a range of 3,500 nautical miles (4,000 mi; 6,500 km) at 28 knots (32 mph; 52 km/h).

A twin launcher for the Seaslug anti-aircraft missile was fitted aft. The Seaslug GWS2 was a beam riding missile which had an effective range of about 23 mi; 37 km with a maximum altitude of 50,000 feet (15,000 m). Up to 39 Seaslugs could be carried horizontally in a magazine that ran much of the length of the ship. Close-in anti-aircraft protection was provided by a pair of Seacat (missile) launchers and two single Oerlikon 20mm cannons, with two twin QF 4.5 inch Mark V gun mounts were fitted forward. A helicopter deck and hangar allowed a single Westland Wessex helicopter to be operated.

A Type 965 long-range air-search radar and a Type 278 height-finding radar was fitted on the ship's mainmast, also fitted on the mainmast was an array of ECM aerials. A Type 992Q Medium range gunnery radar and navigation radar type 978 were fitted to the foremast, also fitted on the foremast was an array of ESM aerials. Type 901 fire control radar for the Seaslug missile was mounted aft. Type 184 sonar was fitted.

Glamorgan was laid down at Vickers-Armstrongs' Newcastle upon Tyne shipyard on 13 September 1962. She was launched on 9 July 1964 and was completed on 13 October 1966.

== Service ==
After commissioning, Glamorgan underwent a long period of trials, these continuing until August 1967, and then worked up her crew in September–October that year. In October 1968, Glamorgan took part in Exercise Coral Sands, a joint amphibious operations off Queensland, Australia, involving forces from Australia, New Zealand, the United States and the United Kingdom, visiting Australian ports after completion of the exercise.

In March 1976, Glamorgan took part in the multi-national exercise Valiant Heritage, a simulated amphibious assault against San Diego. The exercise opened with a live-fire Seaslug exercise in which Glamorgan destroyed a target drone aircraft.

=== Falklands campaign ===
At the start of the Falklands campaign, on 2 April 1982, Glamorgan was already at sea off Gibraltar about to take part in exercises; she was immediately diverted to join the main Royal Navy task force, and served as flagship for Rear Admiral Sandy Woodward, Flag Officer First Flotilla and Commander Carrier Battle Group, during the voyage south until 15 April, when he transferred his flag to the aircraft carrier HMS Hermes. Her most useful armament proved to be her twin 4.5-inch (114 mm) guns, which were intensively used to shell enemy positions onshore.

Glamorgan was first in action on the evening and night of 1 May when she joined forces with the frigates HMS Arrow and HMS Alacrity to bombard Argentine positions around Stanley. The three British ships soon came under attack by three IAI Dagger jets; two 500 lb (230 kg) bombs fell close alongside Glamorgan, causing minor underwater damage.

Two weeks later on 14 May, she supported British special forces during the Raid on Pebble Island in the west of the Falklands. For the next two weeks until the end of May she was almost continuously engaged bombarding various shore positions on the east of the islands mainly as part of a plan to distract attention from the landings at San Carlos Water, but also against the airfield at Stanley and in support of British forces ashore. On 29 May she fired a Seaslug missile at the airstrip, which landed close to an Argentine Air Force radar site, killing one Argentine Air Force lieutenant and wounding several airmen.

At the beginning of June, the task force having been reinforced with other ships, Glamorgan was detached to protect shipping in the Towing, Repair and Logistics Area (TRALA), some 200 miles (320 km) away from the islands, but as the campaign reached a climax she was recalled in the evening of 11 June to support the Royal Marines fighting the Battle of Two Sisters. At 06:37 the following morning, Saturday 12 June 1982, Glamorgan was attacked with an MM38 Exocet missile, fired from an improvised shore-based launcher.

The missiles had been removed from the destroyer ARA Seguí and secured on the launcher, dubbed 'ITB' (Instalación de Tiro Berreta) by the Argentine Navy personnel which in Argentine slang would translate roughly as "trashy firing platform". Two MM38 Exocet missiles, their launcher, transporter, and the associated electronics trailer were assembled by the Argentine navy at Puerto Belgrano and flown by a C-130 Hercules transport aircraft to the Falkland Islands. A RASIT radar supplied by the Argentinian Army tracked Glamorgan''s movements.

Glamorgan was steaming at about 20 knots (37 km/h) some 18 nautical miles (33 km) offshore. The first attempt to fire a missile did not result in a launch. At the second attempt, a missile was launched, but it did not find the target. The third attempt resulted in the last remaining missile tracking the target. The incoming Exocet missile was also being tracked on Glamorgan's bridge and operations room by the Principal Warfare and Navigation Officers.

Before the missile impact, the ship executed a highspeed turn away from the missile, before the Exocet struck the port side adjacent to the hangar near the stern. The turn had prevented the missile from striking the ship's side perpendicularly and penetrating; instead, it hit the deck coaming at an angle, skidded on the deck and detonated, making a 10 by 15 feet (3.0 m × 4.6 m) hole in the hangar deck and a 5 by 4 feet (1.5 m × 1.2 m) hole in the galley area below, where a fire started.

The blast travelled forwards and down, and the missile body, still travelling forwards, penetrated the hangar door, causing the ship's fully fuelled and armed Wessex helicopter (HAS.3 XM837) to explode and start a severe fire in the hangar. Fourteen crew members were killed and over 30 wounded.Six of those killed were from the ship’s flight of 737 Naval Air Squadron. Thirteen crew members who lost their lives that day were buried at sea that evening, a fourteenth, Able Seaman David McCann died of his wounds on 19 August 1982. The ship was underway again with all fires extinguished by 11:00.

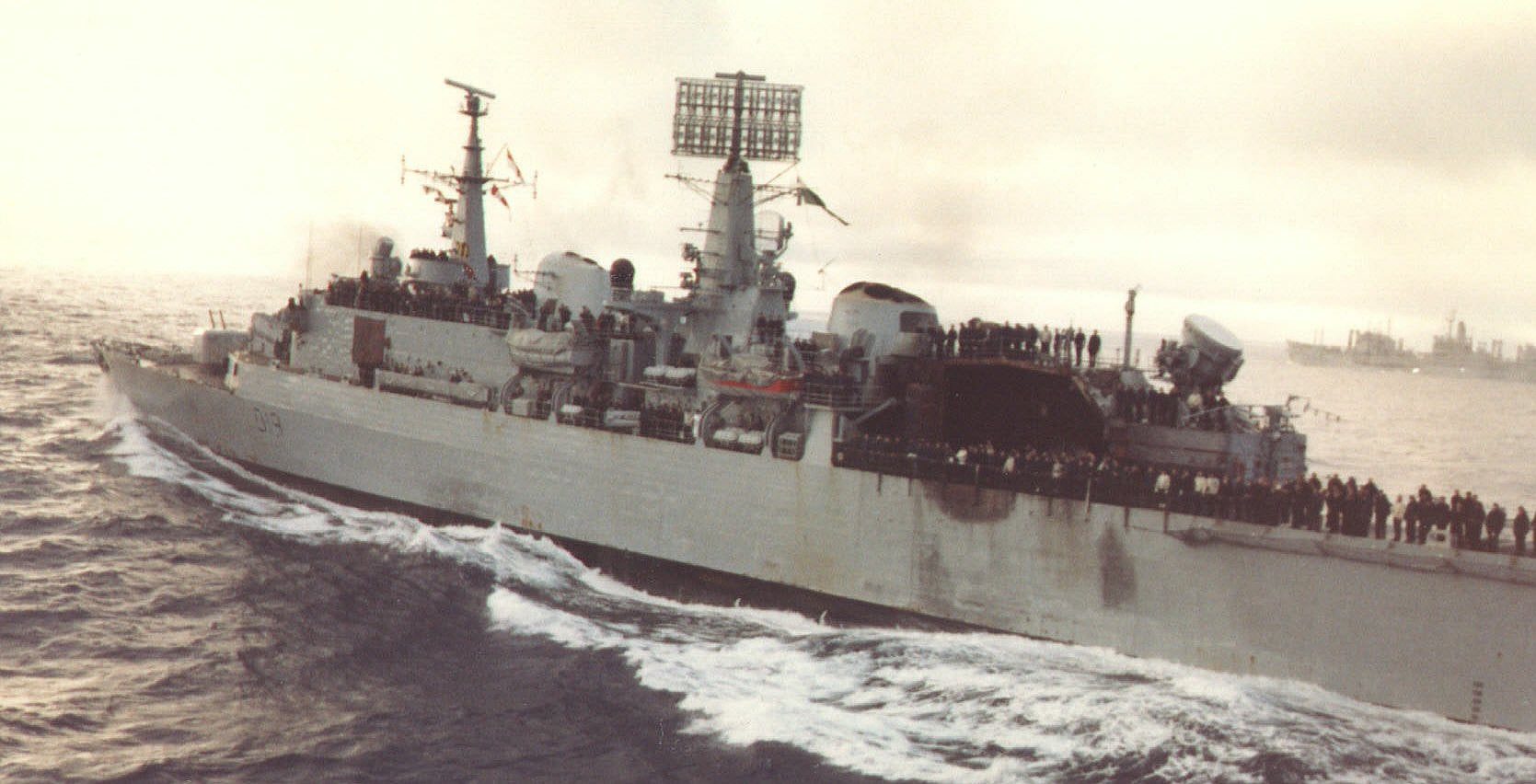
HMS Glamorgan the day after the attack

Both the ship and its aircraft pursued no combat operations for the remainder of the conflict. On the following day, repairs were made at sea and, after the Argentinean surrender on 14 June, more extensive repairs were undertaken in the sheltered bay of San Carlos Water. She sailed for home on 21 June, and re-entered Portsmouth on 10 July 1982 after 104 days at sea.

A Memorial was erected in 2011 in memory of the ship and the lost crew at Hookers Point outside Stanley.

=== After the Falklands campaign ===
HMS Glamorgan spent many months in late 1982 being refitted and repaired. Two sets of STWS-1 triple anti-submarine torpedo tubes, capable of launching US Mark 46 torpedoes were fitted, while the ship's Seacat launchers were removed, replaced by two Bofors 40 mm guns. The Wessex helicopter was replaced by a Westland Lynx. The ship returned to service in 1983.

Her last active deployment for the Royal Navy was in 1983/4 and she was sent on the Armilla Patrol with HMS Brazen. She was originally to sail to the Far East. En route she docked at Gibraltar where the ship's crew were granted shore leave but, within a few hours and with members of her crew still enjoying a 'run ashore' she was back at sea. The bases of the US Marines and French forces in Beirut had been bombed by suicide bombers on 23 October and there were fears that British interests were at risk. Absent crew members were finally rounded up and flown aboard by the ship's Lynx. As the ship had a greater range than Brazen she set off ahead and raced across the Mediterranean to the coast of Lebanon to evacuate the British peace-keeping troops with her Lynx. With this completed she rejoined the rest of her group and proceeded to the Straits of Hormuz.

=== Chilean Navy ===
She was decommissioned by the Royal Navy in September 1986, sold to the Chilean Navy on 3 October that year, and renamed Almirante Latorre. Almirante Latorre arrived in Chile in December 1986. The Sea Slug system was retained, although only for use against surface targets. A single MBB Bo 105 helicopter was carried. She was refitted from September 1995 to August 1996, with the ship's 40mm Bofors guns replaced by two 16-cell launchers for the Israeli Barak surface-to-air missile and the ADAWS combat data system replaced by the Chilean SISDEF-100 system. The destroyer was decommissioned again in late 1998. On 11 April 2005, she sank in the South Pacific while under tow to be broken up.

== See also ==
- Russian cruiser Moskva
- HSV-2 Swift

== Bibliography ==
- Colledge, J. J.; Warlow, Ben (2006) [1969]. Ships of the Royal Navy: The Complete Record of All Fighting Ships of the Royal Navy from the 15th Century to the Present (3rd Rev ed.). London: Chatham Publishing. ISBN 978-1-86176-281-8. OCLC 67375475.
- Baker, A. D. (1998). The Naval Institute Guide to Combat Fleets of the World 1998–1999: Their Ships, Aircraft, and Systems. Annapolis, Maryland, USA: U.S. Naval Institute. ISBN 1-55750-111-4.
- Brown, David (1987). The Royal Navy and the Falklands War. Naval Institute Press. ISBN 0-87021-572-8.
- Friedman, Norman (2008). British Destroyers & Frigates: The Second World War and After. Barnsley, UK: Seaforth Publishing. ISBN 978-1-84832-015-4.
- Gardiner, Robert; Chumbley, Stephen, eds. (1995). Conway's All The World's Fighting Ships 1947–1995. Annapolis, Maryland, USA: Naval Institute Press. ISBN 1-55750-132-7.
- Inskip, Ian (2002). Ordeal by Exocet: HMS Glamorgan and the Falklands War. Chatham. ISBN 186176197X.
- Marriott, Leo (1989). Royal Navy Destroyers Since 1945. Shepperton, UK: Ian Allan. ISBN 0-7110-1817-0.
- McCart, Neil (2014). County Class Guided Missile Destroyers. Maritime Books. ISBN 978-1904459637.
- Moore, John, ed. (1979). Jane's Fighting Ships 1979–80. London: Jane's Yearbooks. ISBN 0-354-00587-1.
- Scales, Robert H. (1990). Firepower in Limited War. Diane Publishing. ISBN 0-7881-1228-7.
- Scheina, Robert L (2003). Latin America's Wars: The age of the professional soldier, 1900–2001. Brassey's. ISBN 1-57488-452-2.
- Sturtivant, Ray; Ballance, Theo (1994). The Squadrons of the Fleet Air Arm. Tonbridge, Kent, UK: Air Britain (Historians) Ltd. ISBN 0-85130-223-8.
- Tinker, David (1982). A Message from the Falklands, The Life and Gallant Death of David Tinker, Lieut. R.N. from his Letters and Poems. Penguin. ISBN 0-14-006778-7.
- Woodward, Sandy; Robinson, Patrick (1992). One Hundred Days: Memoirs of the Falklands Battle Group Commander. HarperCollins. ISBN 0-00-215723-3.
- (in Spanish) Interview to Rear Admiral (Engineer) Julio Pérez team leader of ITB Exocet battery
