= Split Island =

Split Island may refer to:

- Split Island (Nunavut), an island in Canada
- Split Island (Saskatchewan), an island in Canada
- Split Island, Falkland Islands
- Hạfliua also known as Split Island, Fiji

== See also ==
- List of divided islands
