= Dunnose Head =

Dunnose Head may refer to

- Dunnose Head, West Falkland, a small settlement
- Dunnose, Isle of Wight, a headland used in navigation
