= Bay of Harbours =

Bay in the Falkland Islands

Coordinates: 52.2034°S 59.3124°W

Map of the Falkland Islands showing Bay of Harbours

The Bay of Harbours (Spanish: Bahia de los Abrigos) is a bay/fjord on the south east coast of East Falkland. It is in Lafonia between Eagle Passage and the Adventure Sound, and forms the lower segment of the "E" of the peninsula. North Arm is at its landward end.
