= Elephant Cays =

Group of islands in the Falkland Islands

Coordinates: 52°08′30″S 59°50′30″W

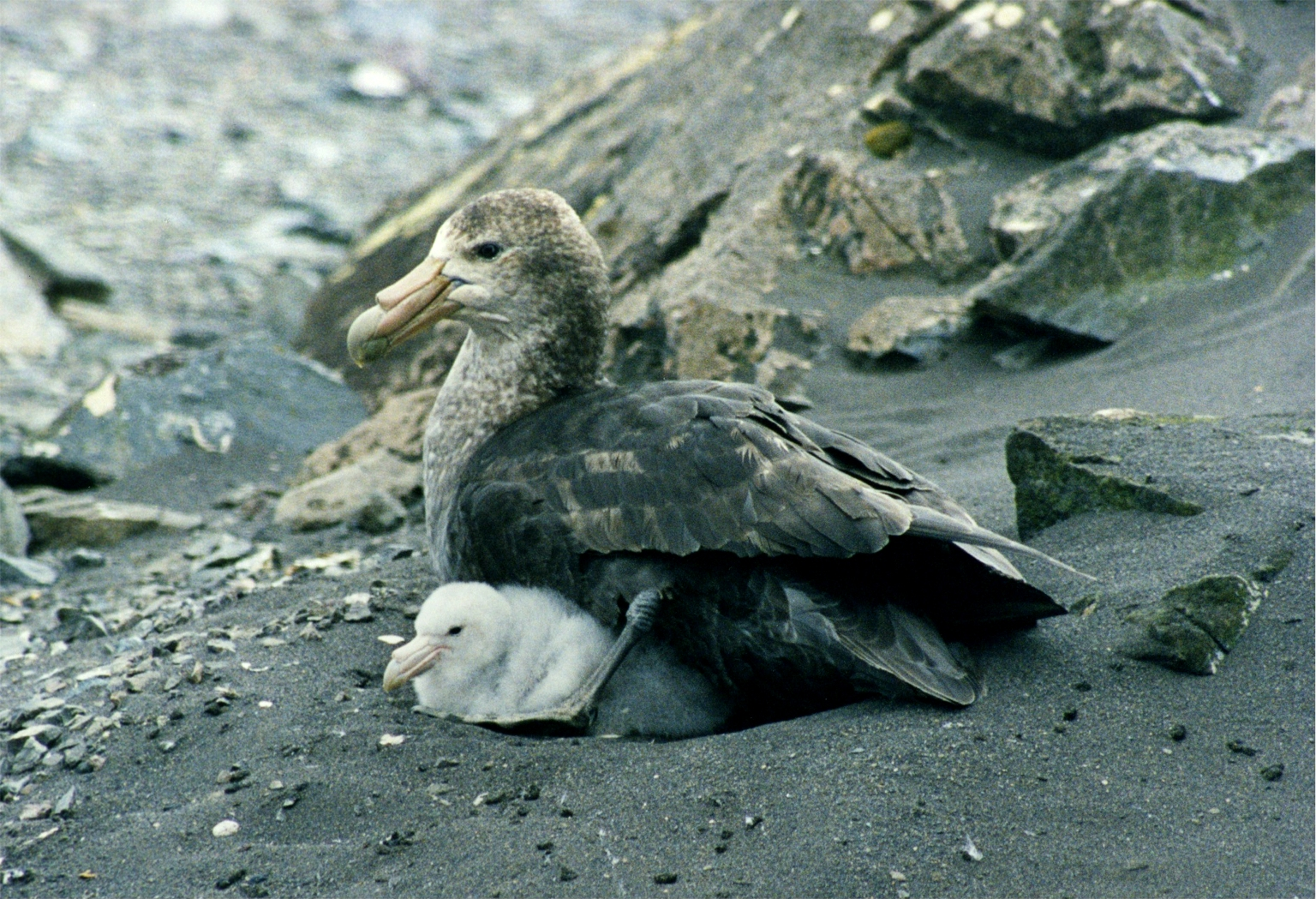
The group is the most important breeding site for southern giant petrels

The Elephant Cays are a group of small islands lying towards the southern end of Falkland Sound, just to the north-west of Speedwell Island, in the Falkland Islands of the South Atlantic Ocean. The group, with a collective area of 248 ha includes Golden Knob, Sandy Cay, West, Southwest and Stinker Islands. It has been identified by BirdLife International as an Important Bird Area (IBA).

== Description ==
Elephant Cays consists of a group of small islands in the south of Falkland Sound. The group has a collective area of 248 hectares and includes the islands of Golden Knob, Sandy Cay, West, Southwest, Stinker, Calista, North Wedge, and Wedge. All of these islands are covered with dense tussocks and have shores of boulders and cliffs, with occasional sandy beaches. Many of them were previously home to cattle, but are now free of both cattle and rodents.

Calista Island is 8 km east of West Falkland and consists of a small hill surrounded by boulders and cliffs. The northeastern end of the island has a small sandy beach that extends for 300 m, with a clearing separating it from the dense tussocks growing on the rest of the island. The remainder of the coast is mostly boulders and cliffs that get taller towards the southern coast, eventually reaching 30 metres high. The island was formerly grazed by cattle, which introduced several plants through their dung. The entire cattle population was culled in the 1980s and the island is currently administered as a private wildlife reserve.

Wedge Island is 2 km northeast of Calista and is a ovular island with coasts of boulders and cliffs. The vegetation consists of dense tussock bogs, with little signs of grazing despite cattle historically being present on the island. It is administered as a private wildlife reserve. Wedge Islet is an extremely small island, 200 m long and at most 50 m wide, located 400 m off the coast of Wedge Island. It was formed by the deposition of boulders from Wedge Island and is covered by tussocks and bogs. North Wedge Island is a small, 400 m long island around 2.25 km northeast of Wedge Island. It tapers from 180 m at its southern tip to 20 m at the north, where it merges into a reef. The island's coasts comprise cliffs and bouldered tidepools, ringed by kelp forests. The island consists of dense tussocks and bogs, with no signs of cattle being present in the recent past. It is owned by the Falkland Islands government and administered as part of the IBA.

West Island in the western Falkland Sound is a low island 1.8 km off West Falkland and 4.5 km northwest of Wedge Island. The shore is mainly boulders, tidepools, and deposits of guano and shellgrit, with large kelp forests off the coast. There are dense tussocks and bogs all over the island.

=== Fauna ===
Birds for which the site is of conservation significance include Magellanic penguins and striated caracaras. The group is the most important breeding site in the world for southern giant petrels, of which there were about 11,000 pairs in early 2005. The islands also provide important habitat for blackish cinclodes, Falklands thrushes, Falklands steamer ducks, Cobb's wrens, rock shags, and kelp geese. Some of the islands are home to breeding populations of southern sea lions.
