= Carew Harbour =

Map of the Falkland Islands

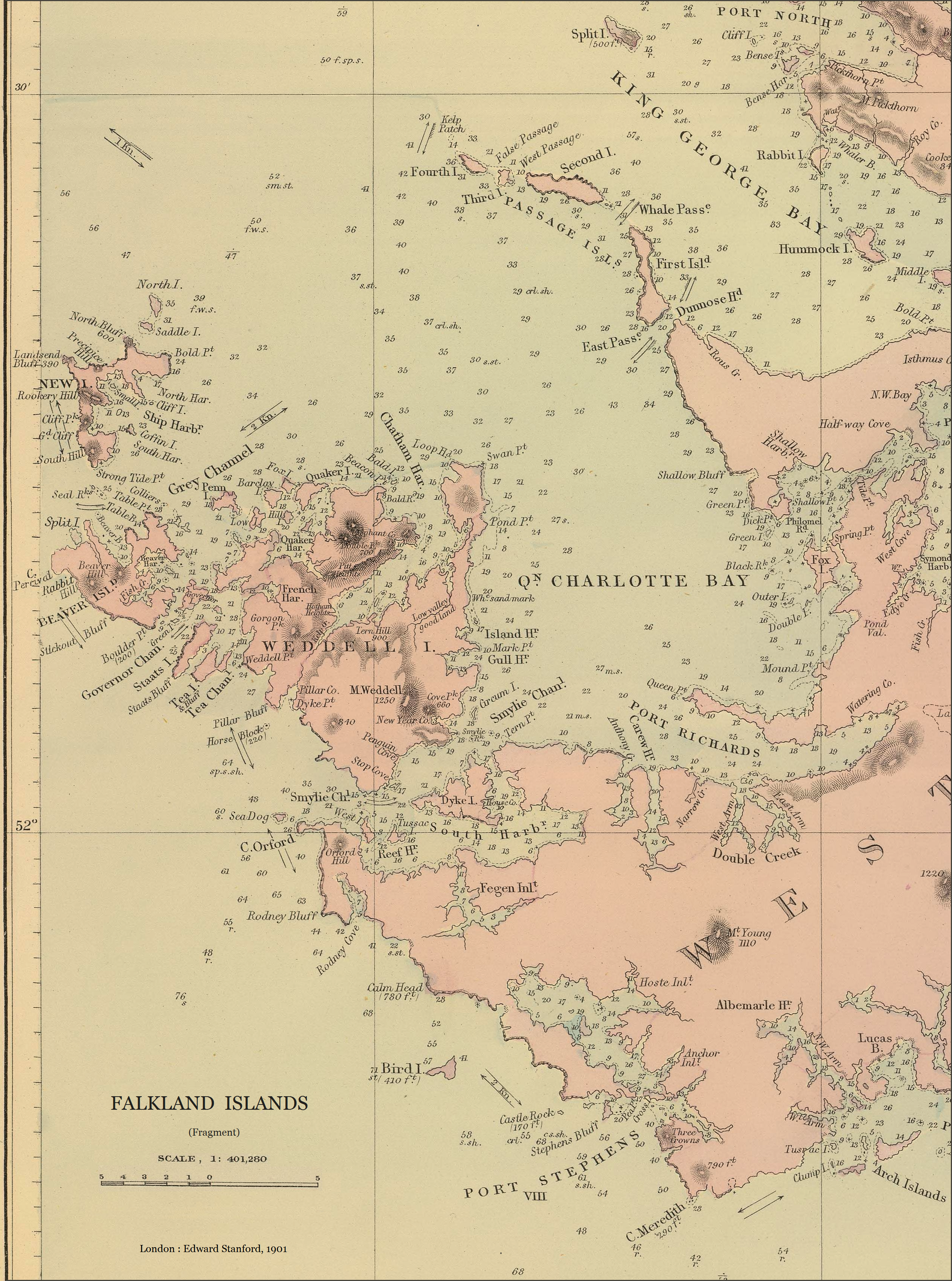
1901 detailed nap of the Weddell Island area featuring Carew Harbour

Carew Harbour (former name Barnards Harbour) is a 3 km (1.6 nmi) wide bay indenting for 8 km (4.3 nmi) the southwest coast of West Falkland in the Falkland Islands, South Atlantic. It is part of Queen Charlotte Bay, centered at 51.8277°S 60.7104°W
