= Adventure Sound =

Bay/fjord of Falkland

Coordinates: 52°06′S 59°00′W

Map of the Falkland Islands showing Adventure Sound

Adventure Sound (Spanish: Bahia del Laberinto, meaning "bay of the labyrinth") is a bay/fjord on the south east coast of East Falkland. It is in Lafonia between Choiseul Sound and the Bay of Harbours, and forms the upper segment of the "E" of the peninsula.
