= Hummock Island =

Island in the Falkland Islands

- Island
- Hummock Island shown within the Falkland Islands
- Coordinates: 51.6143°S 60.4418°W
- Country: Falkland Islands

Area
  - Total: 3.03 km^{2} (1.17 sq mi)
- Highest elevation: 190 m (620 ft)
- Time zone: UTC−3 (FKST)
- If shown, area and population ranks are for all islands and all inhabited islands in the Falklands respectively.

Hummock Island is the largest of a group of islands in King George Bay in the Falkland Islands. It has a land area of 3.03 square kilometres (1.17 sq mi) and is about 6 kilometres (4 mi) long in a north-west to south-east direction. Hummock Island is off the western coast of West Falkland, in King George Bay. The highest point on the island is in the north-east and is 190 metres (620 ft). There are cliffs that often reach over 60 metres (200 ft) high. Similarly, the coast drops away quickly at the island to about 46 metres (25 fathoms).

Hummock Island is situated between Rabbit Island and Middle Island. Other islands in the Hummock Island group include Green Island and Gid's Island. In the middle of the Twentieth Century the island was used as an extension of the New Island sheep farm, and heavy grazing caused much of the Tussac grass to be eaten out; this has left areas of bare 'black ground'. However, the sheep were removed completely in 1981 and the present owner has indicated that he will not restock the island but will allow the vegetation to recover. Gid's and Middle Islands are nature reserves.

Hummock Island was one the very few places where plants of the genus Calandrinia have been found in the wild in the Falkland Islands.

The Hispanicized name for Hummock island is Isla Monticulo.

== Important Bird Area ==
The Hummock Island group has been identified by BirdLife International as an Important Bird Area (IBA). Birds for which the site is of conservation significance include southern rockhopper penguins (1,700 breeding pairs), imperial shags, striated caracaras (8–10 pairs), and Cobb's wrens.
