= Salvador Water =

Coordinates: 51.4698°S 58.4052°W

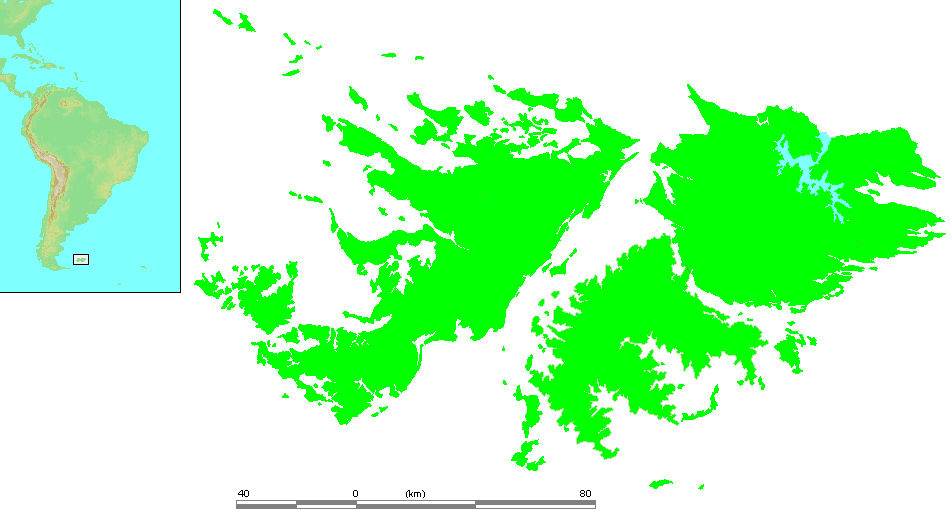

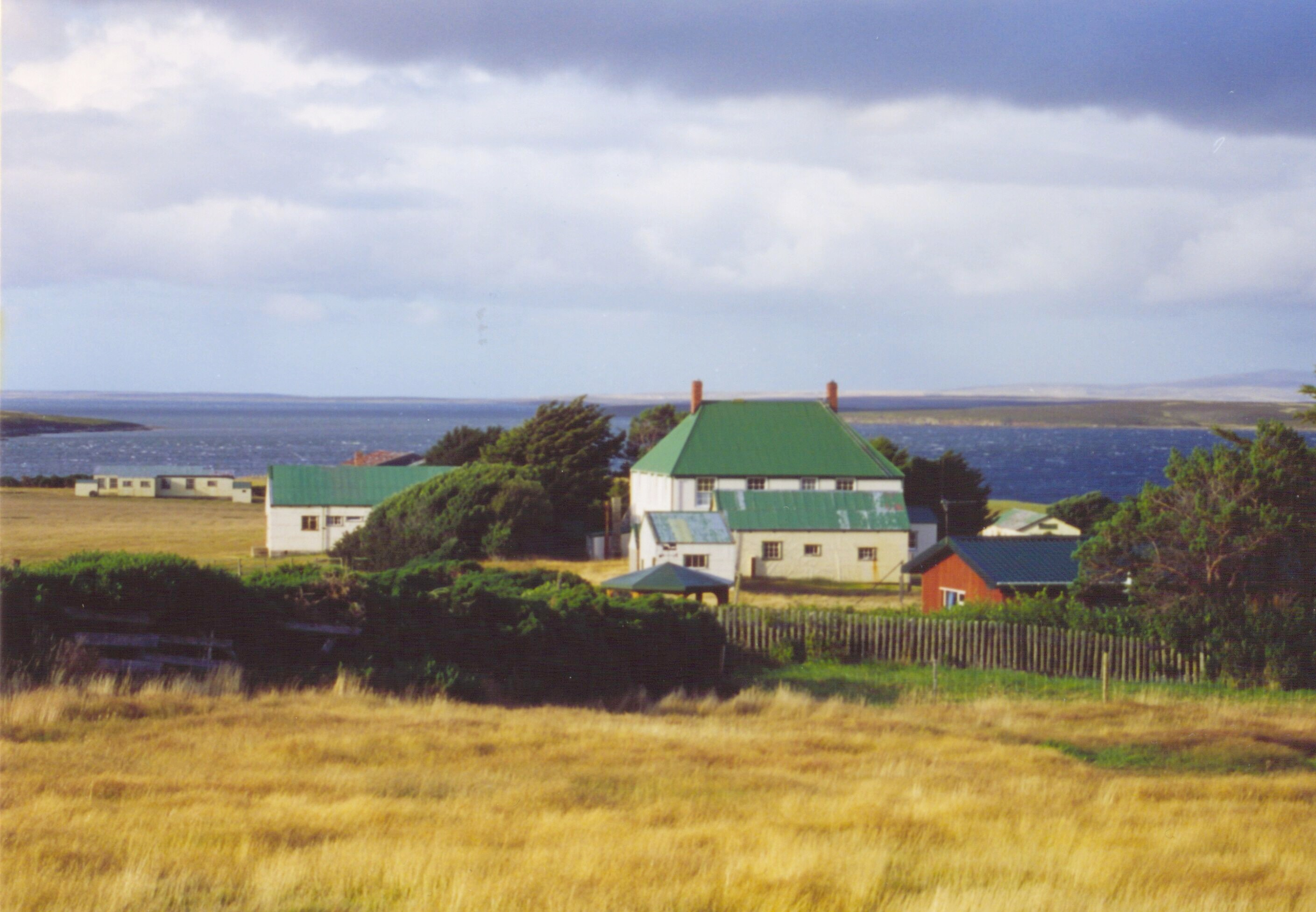
Salvador Water from Teal Inlet

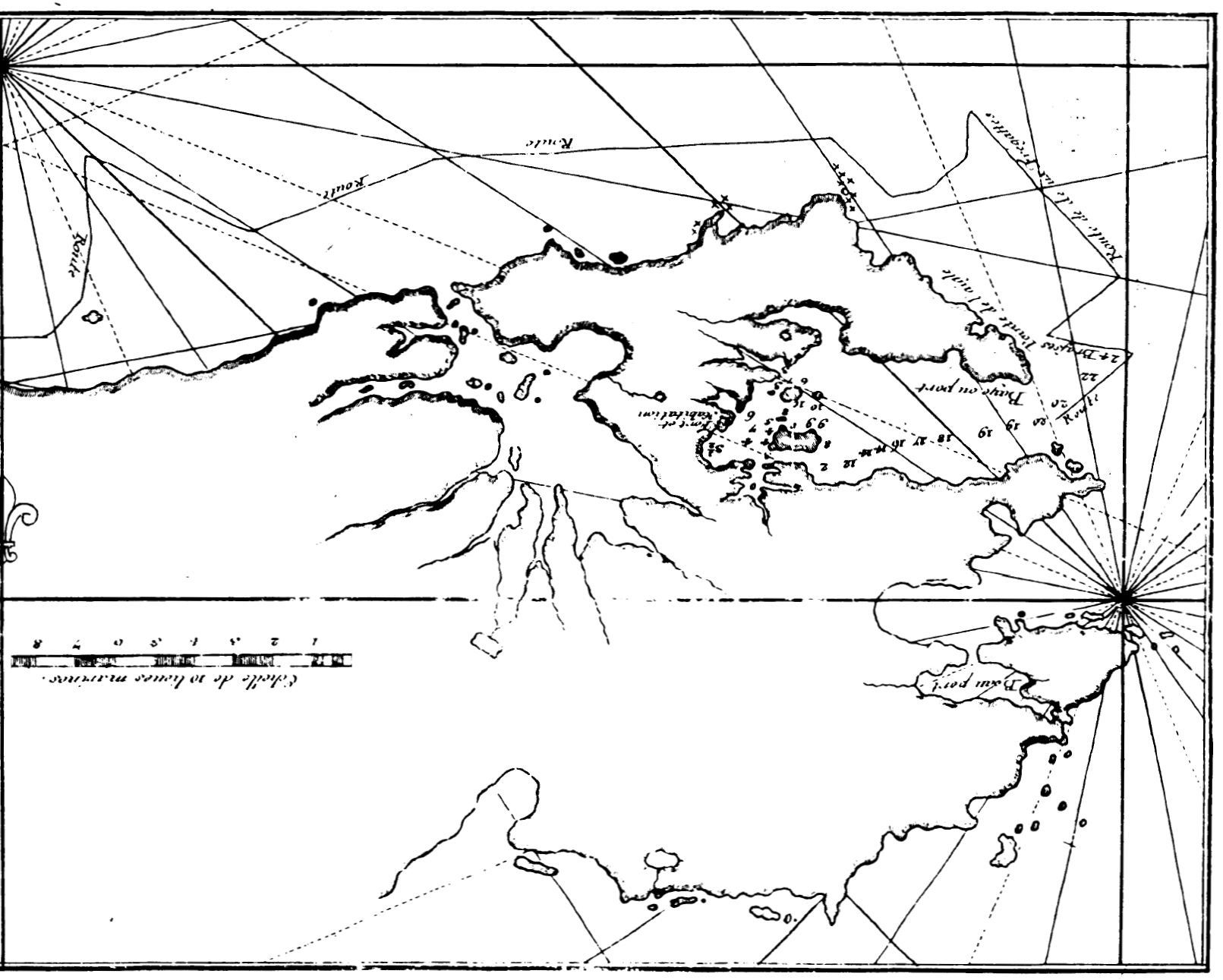
Early mapping of Salvador Water (Dom Pernety, 1769)

Salvador Water or Port Salvador (French: Baye Marville, Spanish: Bahia de la Maravilla) is a bay/inlet on the northeast coast of East Falkland, the largest of the Falkland Islands. It has an intricate shoreline, but could be described as being shaped like an "M".

Settlements on its shoreline include Teal Inlet, Douglas, Salvador and Rincon Grande. Port Louis, the oldest and one time main settlement on the islands is also nearby, on the other side of a narrow isthmus, which backs onto Berkeley Sound.

== Falklands War ==
During the Falklands War, Salvador Water was considered as one of the potential sites for a British amphibious landing but, in the event, the British landings took place on San Carlos Water in the west of East Falkland, on Falkland Sound. Though this site was heavily favoured by Argentines as a potential landingplace, it was in the event considered too shallow by British forces for larger naval vessels to enter. Brig. Thompson is said to have favoured the site.
