= Arch Islands =

Island group in the Falkland Islands

- Island
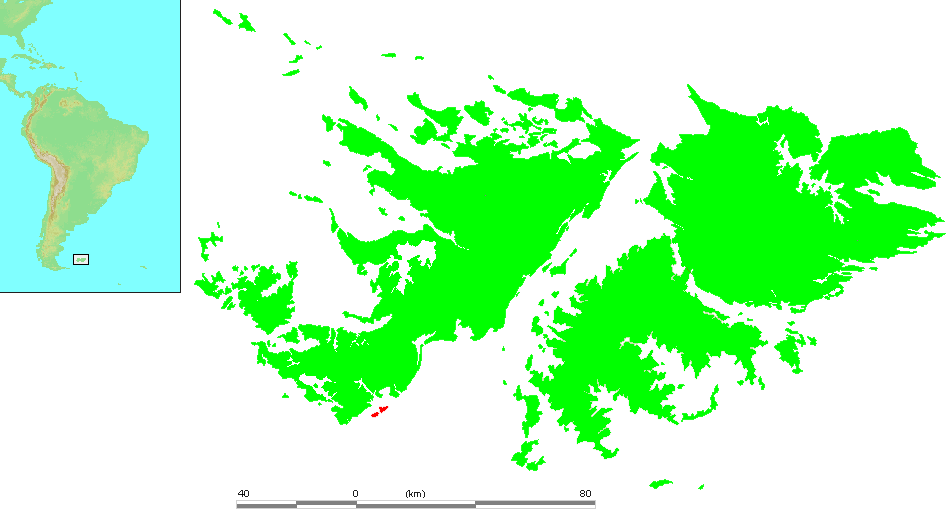
- Coordinates: 52°13′15″S 60°26′41″W
- Country: Falkland Islands
- Named for: English refers to natural arch; Spanish is "French Islets"
- Time zone: UTC−3 (FKST)
- If shown, area and population ranks are for all islands and all inhabited islands in the Falklands respectively.

The Arch Islands (Spanish: Islotes Franceses) are a group of small islands off Port Albemarle on West Falkland in the Falkland Islands. They are uninhabited, and accessible only by boat. They are so called because the largest of the group has a natural arch in it, large enough to allow a fair sized boat through.

The islands are located at the south-western edge of Falkland Sound and include Arch Island East, Big Arch Island, Clump Island, Tussac Island, Pyramid Rock, Natural Arch Island, Sand Bay Island, Last Rock, and Albemarle Rock.

The islands are owned by the British government, and are a part of a national nature reserve which was designated in 1978. Between 1864 and 1866, the penguin colonies on the islands were decimated to provide penguin oil for trading through Stanley. The islands are noted for their populations of breeding striated caracara, and by 2008, the whole island group had been cleared on invasive rodent species.

Other wildlife noted on the islands include Sea lions, and elephant seals, which in the past, were killed and transported by hunters.

Several landforms across the island have been named after service personnel who were killed during the Falklands War. The landforms were previously un-named.

== Islands ==
The below listings shows each island with name, coordinates and size in hectares. Data is taken from Saeri.org.

Island	Coordinates	Size
Albemarle Rock	52.216731383°S 60.386340241°W	9 hectares (22 acres)
Big Arch Island	52.211891946°S 60.444450039°W	217 hectares (540 acres)
Clump Island	52.227088131°S 60.505456127°W	5 hectares (12 acres)
Natural Arch Island	52.229240031°S 60.483697942°W	101 hectares (250 acres)
Pyramid Rock	52.230696349°S 60.505482421°W	1-hectare (2.5-acre)
Sand Bay Island	52.208966934°S 60.469906543°W	21 hectares (52 acres)
Tussac Island	52.2114833°S 60.504364363°W	22 hectares (54 acres)

Smaller islands include Tussac Islet, Pyramid Rock Islet, Arch Island East, and Last Rock. Peat Island (4.9 hectares (12 acres)) is sometimes considered in the island group under the wider classification of the Arch Islands and Cape Lagoon, despite being only 400 metres (1,300 ft) offshore of West Falkland and some distance from the Arch Island group itself.
