= Eagle Passage =

Strait in the Falkland Islands

Coordinates: 52.278°S 59.631°W

Map of the Falkland Islands showing Eagle Passage

Eagle Passage (Spanish: Canal Águila) is a strait in the Falkland Islands, between Lafonia in the southwest of East Falkland, and the smaller islands of Speedwell, Barren and George Island. George Island and Speedwell Island form the stretch of land to the south of the passage while East Falkland forms the northern stretch. The passage is difficult to navigate as ships may founder on the reefs and kelp lying off the surrounding islands.

It takes its name from the same root as "Eagle Island", the former name of Speedwell Island.

The passage is parallel to Choiseul Sound and is connected to Falkland Sound and the Atlantic Ocean.
