= Storm Mountain (Falkland Islands) =

Mountain in East Falkland, Falkland Islands

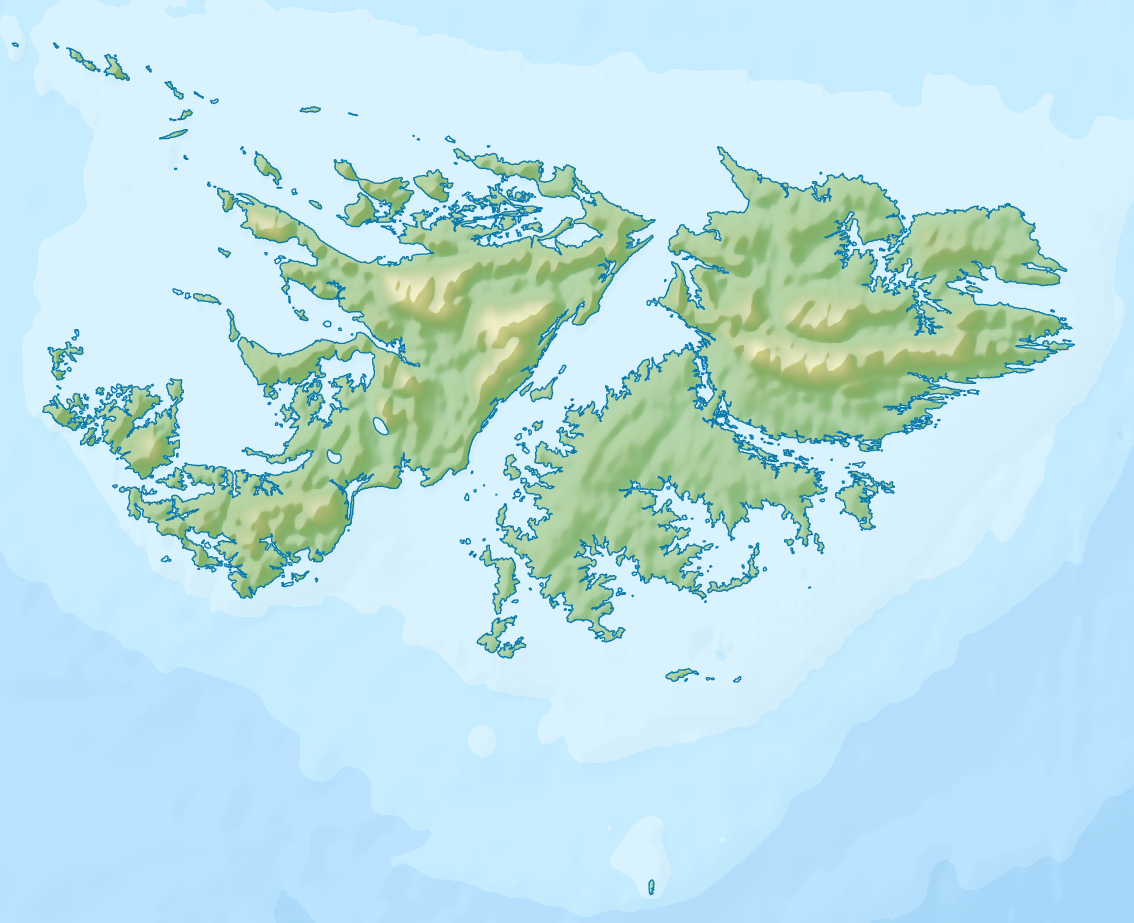
- Location within Falkland Islands

Highest point
- Elevation: 521 m (1,709 ft)
- Prominence: 481 m (1,578 ft)
- Isolation: 36 km (22 miles)
- Coordinates: 51°25′53″S 60°32′28″W

Geography
- Location: West Falkland, Falkland Islands, south Atlantic Ocean

Storm Mountain is on West Falkland in the Falkland Islands. It is 1,709 feet (521 m) high (the 9th highest in the Falklands). Because of its location on a narrow peninsula jutting out into the South Atlantic, between Byron Sound and King George Bay, it is highly exposed, hence its name. Storm Mountain sits immediately to the east of Byron Heights.
