= Barren Island, Falkland Islands =

Barren Island
- Island
- Barren Island shown within the Falkland Islands
- Coordinates: 52°22′33″S 59°42′00″W
- Country: Falkland Islands

Area
  - Total: 11.5 km^{2} (4.4 sq mi)
- Time zone: UTC−3 (FKST)
- If shown, area and population ranks are for all islands and all inhabited islands in the Falklands respectively.

Barren Island (Spanish: Isla Pelada) is one of the Falkland Islands, lying south west of East Falkland and south east of George Island. It is separated from Lafonia by Eagle Passage. Its total area is 11.5 square kilometres (4.4 sq mi).

It, together with George Island is run as a sheep farm and the tourism there is well run. The island is free of rats, and this is important for the survival of small songbirds.

There are two listed buildings on Barren Island, a house and a woolshed.
