= Passage Islands =

- Island
- Location of the Passage Islands within the Falkland Islands
- Coordinates: 51.592°S 60.724°W
- Country: Falkland Islands
- Time zone: UTC−3 (FKST)
- If shown, area and population ranks are for all islands and all inhabited islands in the Falklands respectively.

The Passage Islands (Spanish: Islas del Pasaje) are a group of four islands in the Falkland Islands of the South Atlantic Ocean. They lie off Dunnose Head, West Falkland, at the mouth of King George Bay.

== Description ==
The largest of the group is Second Passage Island which is 9 km (5.6 mi) long from east to west and up to 2 km (1.2 mi) wide. Much of the coastline is characterised by cliffs up to 30 metres (98 ft) high. The highest point is 75 metres (246 ft) Sixtus Hill. Past overgrazing has caused erosion and reduced the cover of tussac. There are several ponds, some of which are only seasonal, one of which provides feeding habitat for waders and waterfowl. The Third and Fourth Passage Islands are 800 m apart and low-lying, rising to about 30 metres (98 ft). They were only briefly stocked with cattle in the 1960s and have good tussac coverage. None of the three islands have ever had introduced predators.

== History ==
Around 1885, a fire broke out on First Island and burnt continuously for two years, burning the tussac bogs entirely and exposing bare rock in some areas. Under the ownership of John Hamilton Ltd., the Passage Islands became part of the Weddell Group, comprising Weddell Island, Beaver Island, the Passage Islands and a number of smaller surrounding islands. By the mid-1980s, the Passage Islands had become abandoned and decrepit. Subsequently, the islands became part of Shallow Harbour Farm.

== Important Bird Area ==
The Passage Islands group has been identified by BirdLife International as an Important Bird Area (IBA). Birds for which the site is of conservation significance include Falkland steamer ducks, gentoo penguins (300 breeding pairs), southern rockhopper penguins (145 pairs), southern giant petrels, striated caracaras, white-bridled finches, blackish cinclodes and Cobb's wrens.
