= Middle Island, Falkland Islands =

Middle Island
- Island
- Middle Island shown within the Falkland Islands
- Coordinates: 51°38′14″S 60°20′53″W
- Country: Falkland Islands

Area
  - Total: 1.55 km^{2} (0.60 sq mi)
- Highest elevation: 120 m (390 ft)
- Time zone: UTC−3 (FKST)
- If shown, area and population ranks are for all islands and all inhabited islands in the Falklands respectively.

Middle Island is one of the Hummock Island group in the Falkland Islands. It is near West Falkland, to its west, near the estuary of the Chartres River in King George Bay It is to the south east of Hummock Island.

Middle Island has a land area of 155 hectares (380 acres; 0.60 sq mi) and its cone rises to 120 metres (390 ft). It is believed that it was used for grazing for a short time before 1930 but has been not been grazed since then and is free of predators.
