= Hookers Point =

Landfrom of the Falkland Islands

Hookers Point Punta Hookers
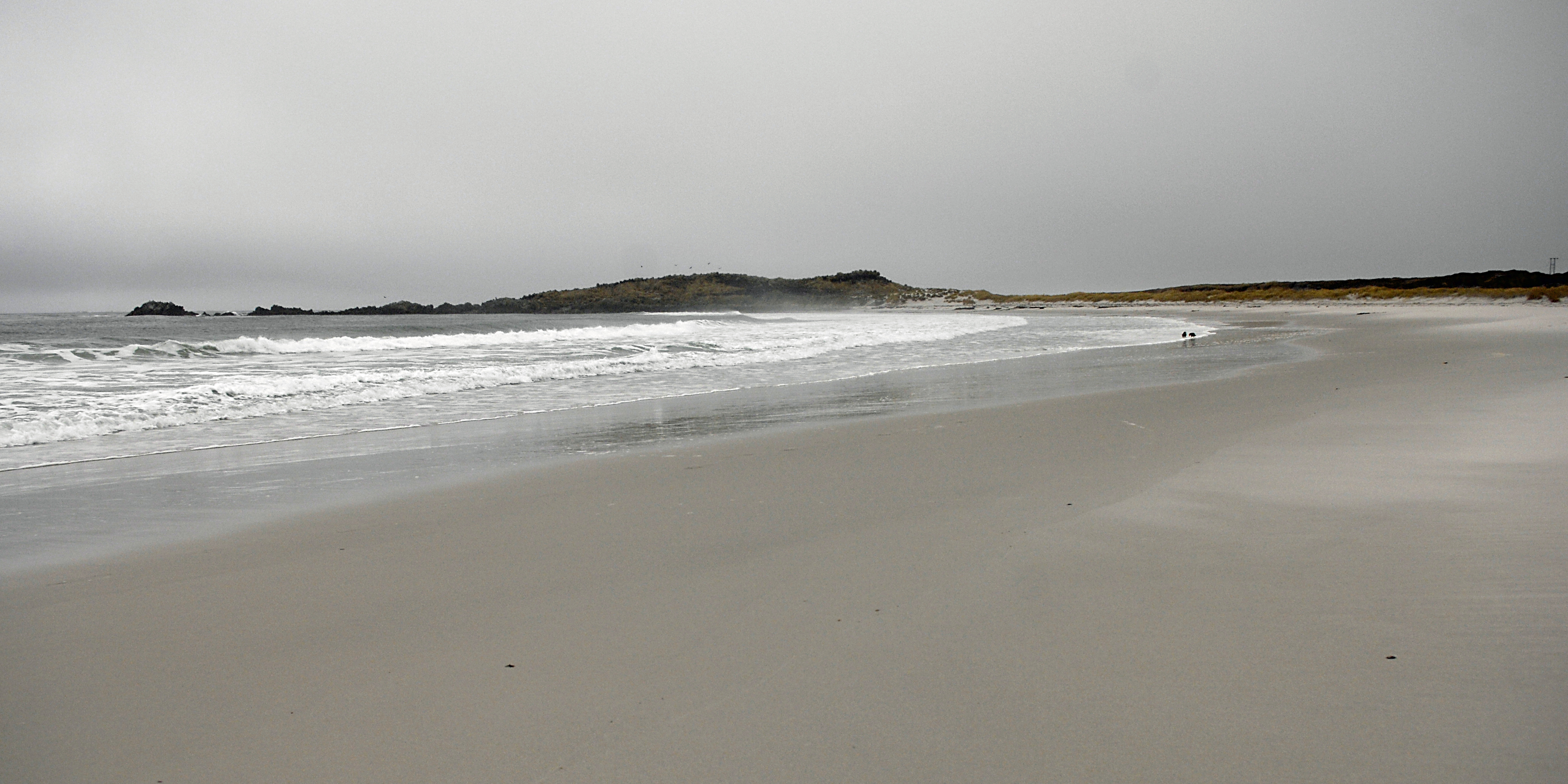
- Hookers Point viewed looking south
- Interactive map of Hookers Point
- Coordinates: 51.70101°S 57.78329°W
- Location: Falkland Islands

Hookers Point (Spanish: Punta Hookers), sometimes spelt as Hooker's Point, is a headland east of Port Stanley, on East Falkland, in the Falkland Islands. It is located on the eastern coast of East Falkland on the road between Port Stanley and Port Stanley Airport. It is 3.5 kilometres (2.2 mi) west of Stanley and is named after Sir Joseph Hooker who visited the islands in 1842 as part of an antarctic expedition.

In 1972, an airfield was opened at Hookers Point (called Hooker's Point) which hosted international flights to Argentina for five years until the present Port Stanley Airport was opened in 1977.

In December 1980, the site was adopted by the senior school at Port Stanley as a project to return wildlife to the point and stop erosion of the land. In April 1982, the site was occupied by Royal Marines during the Argentine invasion of the islands.

Magellanic penguins used to dig burrows about 3 metres (10 ft) deep to raise their chicks at Hookers Point.
