= Queen Charlotte Bay =

Bay in the Falkland Islands

Coordinates: 51.8277°S 60.7104°W

Map of the Falkland Islands showing Queen Charlotte Bay

Queen Charlotte Bay (Spanish: Bahia San Julian) is a bay/fjord on the west coast of West Falkland in the Falkland Islands.

== Geography ==
It is one of the two main bays on that coast, the other being King George Bay. It has an extremely intricate shoreline, and is regularly battered by westerly winds. The entrance across the bay from Swan Point (on the north-eastern tip of Weddell Island) and Dunnose Head on West Falkland is 16 kilometres (10 mi).

== Name ==
The bay is said to be named after Charlotte of Mecklenburg-Strelitz, a queen of England.

Several islands are in the bay; the named ones are Weddell Island, the Double Creek Islands (East, West and Outer Islet), Fox Island, Double Island (which covers 9 hectares (22 acres), Outer Island (which covers an area of 20 hectares (49 acres), and Harpoon Island which covers an area of 3 hectares (7.4 acres). The three islands were the first offshore islands (i.e. not on the two main islands of West or East Falkland) to benefit from a rat eradication scheme in 2001. Double Island is made up of two land masses joined by a small neck of land (hence the name Double Island).

== Wildlife ==
The bay is noted for being a good place to see baleen, fin, minke, and sei whales, with occasional sightings of Peale's dolphins and orcas. Other whales and sea mammals have been spotted in the area, but stay outside the bay, which is believed to have a maximum depth of 60 metres (200 ft). The bay is also used as a sheltering point for fishing boats involved in the squid-fishing industry. Birdlife around the bay includes thin-billed prions, striated caracara, rock shags, sheathbills and king shags. The bay is also host to juvenile Doryteuthis gahi (Patagonian squid) which are part of the diet of various animals in the area including Gentoo penguins.
