= Port Edgar, Falkland Islands =

Settlement and harbour in the Falklands Islands

Port Edgar
- Puerto Edgardo
- Port Edgar is just south of the 52° line of latitude, to the south-west of Fox Bay.

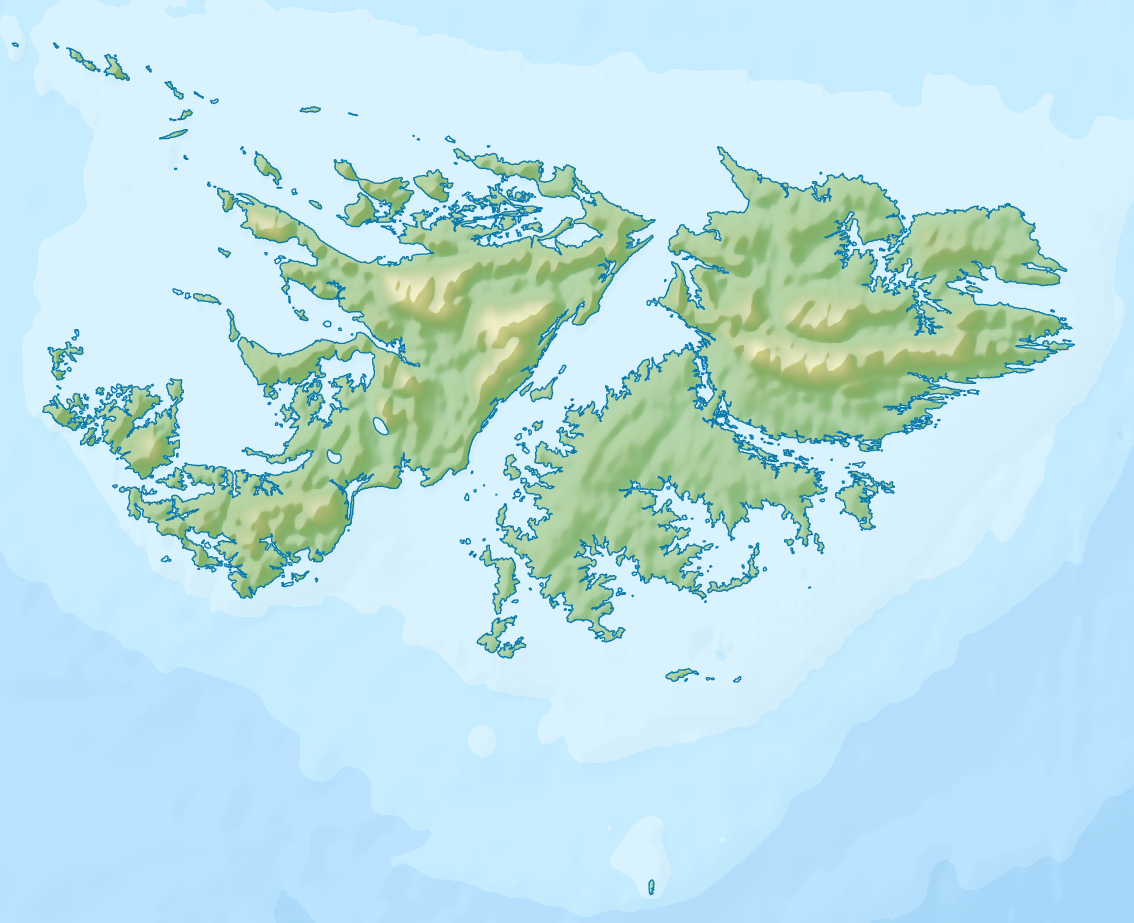
- Location within Falkland Islands Location within South America
- Location: West Falkland, Falkland Islands
- Coordinates: 52°0′42″S 60°17′12″W
- Type: Natural harbour
- Ocean/sea sources: Atlantic Ocean
- Average depth: 10–17 fathoms (60–102 ft; 18–31 m)
- Max. depth: 18 fathoms (108 ft; 33 m)

Port Edgar (Spanish: Puerto Edgardo) is an inlet and safe harbour on West Falkland, the Falkland Islands. The harbour is named after a Royal Navy lieutenant who charted the area between 1786 and 1787. The settlement, also named Port Edgar, is to the south of the harbour and has an airstrip which FIGAS fly to.

== History ==
The harbour is reached through a narrow inlet from Falkland Sound with two spits of land reaching northwards and southwards, which are known as North Head and South Head. The gap between the two heads is just less than 200 yards (180 m) in width. (Note: A book written in 1847 names the two spits of land as Leven and Eden, and states the width of the gap to be 210 fathoms (1,260 ft; 380 m), but only 150 fathoms (900 ft; 270 m) is clear of weed.) The harbour itself is 7 miles (11 km) long, 1-mile (1.6 km) wide, and about 17 fathoms (102 ft; 31 m) deep. Water from South Lake Sulivan feeds into the harbour from the north. South Lake Sulivan is the largest freshwater lake in the Falkland Islands covering an area of 12.2 square kilometres (4.7 sq mi).

In 1830, HMS Eden took refuge in the harbour due to bad weather on her journey from Cape Horn to Rio de Janeiro. Her captain described the harbour as having either no, or a very low tide, observing a drop and rise of only 3 feet (0.91 m) whilst they were anchored over three days. In 1930, HMS Danae visited the Falklands and was at anchor in Port Edgar. The safe harbour afforded by Port Edgar has also meant that it has been used by whalers to flense their catches.

A settlement at the south of the anchorage is also named Port Edgar. A ridge of quartzite extends from Port Edgar settlement in the south northwards to White Rock Bay, at the north-eastern edge of West Falkland. Several landforms near to Port Edgar were given names after fallen British servicemen during the Falklands War. This was a project commissioned in 2022 as part of the 40th anniversary commemorations where over 250 landforms were identified and named after those who had died in the conflict.

The settlement of Port Edgar is sheltered from the sea by the Edgar Ridge (to the east), and the settlement is known to be a good location to be based at for fishing (sea trout and mullet), and there is a gentoo penguin colony just to the south-east. A survey conducted in 1999, estimated the colony had over 1,400 nests. To the south of the Port Edgar settlement is Port Edgar airport, located at 52°5′26″S 60°16′57″W at a height of 65 feet (20 m) above sea level. The airport does not have an official ICAO code, but the FIGAS company, list it as FK-0032.

Port Edgar is named after Lieutenant Thomas Edgar of the Royal Navy, who charted the area around Port Edgar in 1786–1787. The Hispanicized version of the name is Puerto Edgardo.
