= Douglas, Falkland Islands =

Settlement on East Falkland

Coordinates: 51.4593°S 58.6082°W

Douglas, also known as Douglas Settlement, is a settlement in the Falkland Islands, a British Overseas Territory. It is located on the west shore of Salvador Water on East Falkland. Established as a sheep farm in the mid-19th century by Robert Greenshield, it retains a small agricultural community.

== History ==
The Douglas settlement was founded in 1871 when Scottish settler Robert Greenshield leased multiple parcels for sheep farming. He initially named it as Howgate, after his place of birth in Scotland, and later renamed it as Douglas station after the name of another village near his birthplace in Scotland. Initially formed to raise cattle, it was converted into a sheep farm later. The Greenshield family managed the farm until at least 1982, with Robert’s son and grandson continuing operations after his death in 1878. It was acquired by the government in the late 1980s.

== Geography ==
Douglas is located on the west shore of Salvador Water on East Falkland, in the Falkland Islands, a British Overseas Territory. It has a cold semi-arid climate. After the government acquired the farm, it was divided it into four sections–King’s Ridge, Home Farm, Bombilla, and New House.

== Demographics ==
Douglas had roughly 351 residents as recorded in the 2012 census. Sheep farming is the core local activity, in line with East Falkland’s agricultural tradition stemming from 19th‑century wool production.
