= North Arm =

Settlement in the Falkland Islands

- North Arm within the Falkland Islands
- Coordinates: 52°07′25″S 59°22′02″W
- British Overseas Territory: Falkland Islands

Population (2016)
  - Total: 25
- Time zone: UTC−3 (FKST^{[a]})

North Arm is a settlement in Lafonia, the southern part of East Falkland, in the Falkland Islands. It sits on the south coast, on the shore of the Bay of Harbours, from where it overlooks Sea Lion Island in the distance. In 2007, the population was 25 people, of which six were children. It is the largest settlement on East Falkland south of Goose Green. North Arm is located 90 miles (140 km) from Stanley, and it takes about four and a half hours to drive between the two settlements.

== History ==
=== Sheep farming ===
During the 1893-4 sheep farming season the Falkland Islands Company's farm at North Arm was introduced to a new steam machine, which sheared sheep automatically; however, due to performance issues with machine shearing, many farms continued hand shearing until the early 1960s, but by the 1970–71 season only one farm still practiced hand shearing.

North Arm was owned by the Falkland Islands Company until 1991, when it was sold to the government. There is a school, a community centre and a shop that opens for three hours a week.

=== Disappearance of Alan Addis ===
North Arm was the scene of the still unresolved 1980 disappearance Royal Marine Alan Addis. In August 1980, Alan Addis, 19 years old at the time, was stationed in the Falkland Islands as part of a six-man unit of Royal Marines tasked with preparing local inhabitants for a potential invasion by Argentina On 8 August, after a week of working, the marines went to the social club in North Arm to spend the evening drinking. Addis was last seen around 1:30 a.m., and after the marines' ship had left port at 7 a.m. the following morning it was turned around after Addis was discovered to be absent. The following search yielded no results, and it was initially believed that Addis had died of an accident, possibly the result of slipping and falling into the Bay of Harbours or wandering off into the interior of Lafonia. This was disputed by Alan Addis's mother, Ann Addis, who, after going to the Falkland Islands herself to investigate, believed that her son had been murdered. In the years that followed no traces of Alan Addis were found, with an inquest into the disappearance returning an open verdict and Falkland Islands law enforcement coming to share Ann Addis's suspicions of murder.

== Geography ==
North Arm is located in a drier area of the Falkland Islands, and receives around 400 mm (16 in) of rainfall annually, compared to the roughly 600 millimetres (24 in) that Stanley receives. The settlements surroundings are part of the geological Bay of Harbours Formation, consisting mainly of sandstone and siltstone, and in some places the ground consists of a combination "of rough, ridged, topography and lines of diddle-dee marking sandstone beds." The Bay of Harbours Formation was formed during the Late Permian, and although uncommon, fossils from that era are present in the formation, including ones of Glossopteris. Some buildings in North Arm, and one to the east of Goose Green, are made of sandstone from the formation, and these buildings have proven to be resistant to frost damage.

== Sources ==
- Aldiss, D.T.; Edwards, E.J. (1999). The geology of the Falkland Islands (PDF). British Geological Survey (Report). p. 2.
