= Roy Cove =

Settlement on West Falkland

Roy Cove is a settlement on West Falkland, in the Falkland Islands, in the north west. It faces southwards, onto King George Bay and was founded in 1872.

== Geography ==
There is a deep water creek by the settlement, the Byron Heights to the north. The saltwater stream nearby the settlement is named Herbert. The settlement has an airstrip located at 51.539°S 60.356°W, to the north-east of Roy Cove.

== History ==
In 1872, William Wickham Bertrand founded Roy Cove after splitting from his business partner Ernest Holmested. The pair had originally been developing a sheep farm at Shallow Bay (Hill Cove), which was heavily in debt. As part of the division of the estate, Bertrand took the western section, assuming half the debts, and established the new settlement at Roy Cove. He initially named it Westbourne Station. The livestock was divided between the partners, with a loose arrangement allowing Bertrand continued access to run sheep at Shallow Bay in return for help with shearing and lamb-marking. In 1888, the settlement was listed as having four houses, four detached houses, and a population of 53. The detached houses refer to shepherd's huts.

In the late 1950s, Roy Cove was subject to an experimental programme which saw grasses and clovers of a higher nutritional value that what grows normally planted in the area. One of the farms in Roy Cove was divided into six sections and sold for £190,000 in 1980. The new owners were due to occupy the farm on 2 April 1982, the day that the islands were invaded by Argentine forces. The farmers could not start at the agreed time, and so payment to the government was late which caused a legal dispute.
