= Port Albemarle =

Settlement in the Falkland Islands

Coordinates: 52.191°S 60.540°W

Map of the Falkland Islands showing Port Albemarle.

Port Albemarle (Spanish: Puerto Santa Eufemia) is a settlement on West Falkland, in the Falkland Islands.

== Geography ==
It is in the far south of the island, on the east side, at the southern end of Falkland Sound. It lies at the entrance of Lucas Bay and Northwest Arm, and the water has a depth between 10 fathoms (60 ft; 18 m) and 16 fathoms (96 ft; 29 m).

The Arch Islands are near here, which have a large population of Gentoo penguins, and the small uninhabited Peat Island also lies 400 metres (1,300 ft) offshore.

== History ==
Owing to its large harbour, Albemarle became a successful sealing station, which started there in 1928, and the ruins of the buildings are still to be seen. It was enlarged during the post-World War II period by the Colonial Development Company like Ajax Bay, and included its own power station, jetty, Nissen huts etc. These have all been abandoned, the sealing enterprise was last attempted between 1950 and 1953, but the low numbers of seals could not justify the endeavour. There is still a sheep station at Port Albemarle, which when it is not being used for sheep-shearing, the buildings are rented out to tourists.

Turnbull Inlet near to Port Albemarle was named after a fallen British serviceman during the Falklands War. This was a project commissioned in 2022 as part of the 40th anniversary commemorations where over 250 landforms were identified and named after those who had died in the conflict.
