= George Island =

- Island
- George Island shown within the Falkland Islands
- Coordinates: 52°20′48″S 59°44′59″W
- Country: Falkland Islands

Area
  - Total: 24 km^{2} (9.3 sq mi)
- Time zone: UTC−3 (FKST)
- If shown, area and population ranks are for all islands and all inhabited islands in the Falklands respectively.

George Island (Spanish: Isla Jorge) is the second largest of the Speedwell Island Group in the Falkland Islands with a land area of 24 square kilometres (9.3 sq mi). It lies south of Speedwell Island and south west of East Falkland, and is separated from Lafonia by Eagle Passage. The island is generally flat, rising no more than 18 metres (59 ft) above sea level, and there are several ponds and there is severe soil erosion in the central section. However, the island is free of rats.

George and Barren Islands together are run as a sheep farm, the most southerly in the Falkland Islands. There is also tourism that is well managed.
