= King George Bay =

Map of the Falkland Islands showing King George Bay (centre left, bounded by the passage islands)

King George Bay (Spanish: Bahia 9 de Julio) is a large bay on the coast of West Falkland in the Falkland Islands, facing westwards. There are three settlements on the bay Chartres, Dunnose Head and Roy Cove. Storm Mountain is on the north coast. It contains numerous islands, including the Passage Islands and Split Island. The bay is roughly 21 miles (34 km) long and 10 miles (16 km) wide.

Roy Cove is found on the coast at the north of the bay.

== Ecology ==
Peatland is found on many of the islands in the bay, and is considered ecologically important.

== Disambiguation ==
The bay is not to be confused with the bay at King George Island in the south shetland islands.

== See also ==
- Stump Rock
