= Salvador Settlement =

Settlement in the Falkland Islands

Coordinates: 51.436°S 58.372°W

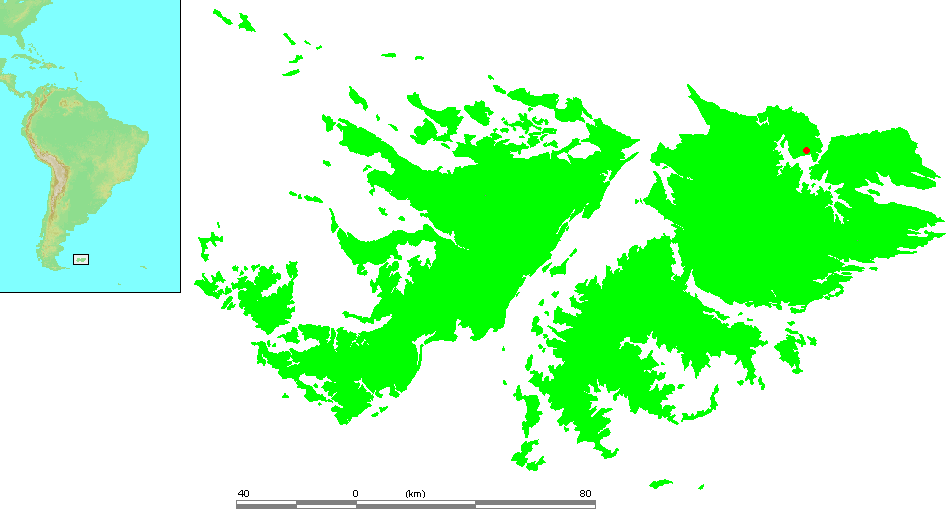
Location of Salvador

Salvador, also called Salvador Settlement Corral, is a small harbour and settlement on East Falkland, in the Falkland Islands, It is on the north east coast, on the south shore of Port Salvador. It had a population of 3 in 2018. It is one of a handful of Spanish place names on the islands still in use.

It was founded by Andrés Pitaluga, a Gibraltarian, in the 1830s, who arrived from Gibraltar via continental South America. His descendants still run the farm there and the settlement is therefore sometimes referred to as "Gibraltar Station" or "Gibraltar Settlement".
