= Dunnose Head, West Falkland =

Settlement in West Falkland in Philomel Pass, Queen Charlotte Bay

Coordinates: 51.756°S 60.419°W

Dunnose Head is a small settlement in West Falkland in Philomel Pass, Queen Charlotte Bay. It is about 50 miles (80 km) west south west of Port Howard, and does not have a proper road connection.

Dunnose Head used to be part of Packe Brothers Ltd holdings, but on sub-division was formed into three farms. Two of these were based on the old settlement, these were Narrows Farm (covering the old Packe's area East of the Settlement), and Dunnose Head Farm,(covering the old Centre Camp and Stud Flock). The other farm was based on Shallow Harbour House, which is west of the old settlement, and covers the old Packe's Ewe Camps which were named South and North Camps plus Raus Creek.
