= Wildlife of the Falkland Islands =

Ecosystems of the Falkland Islands

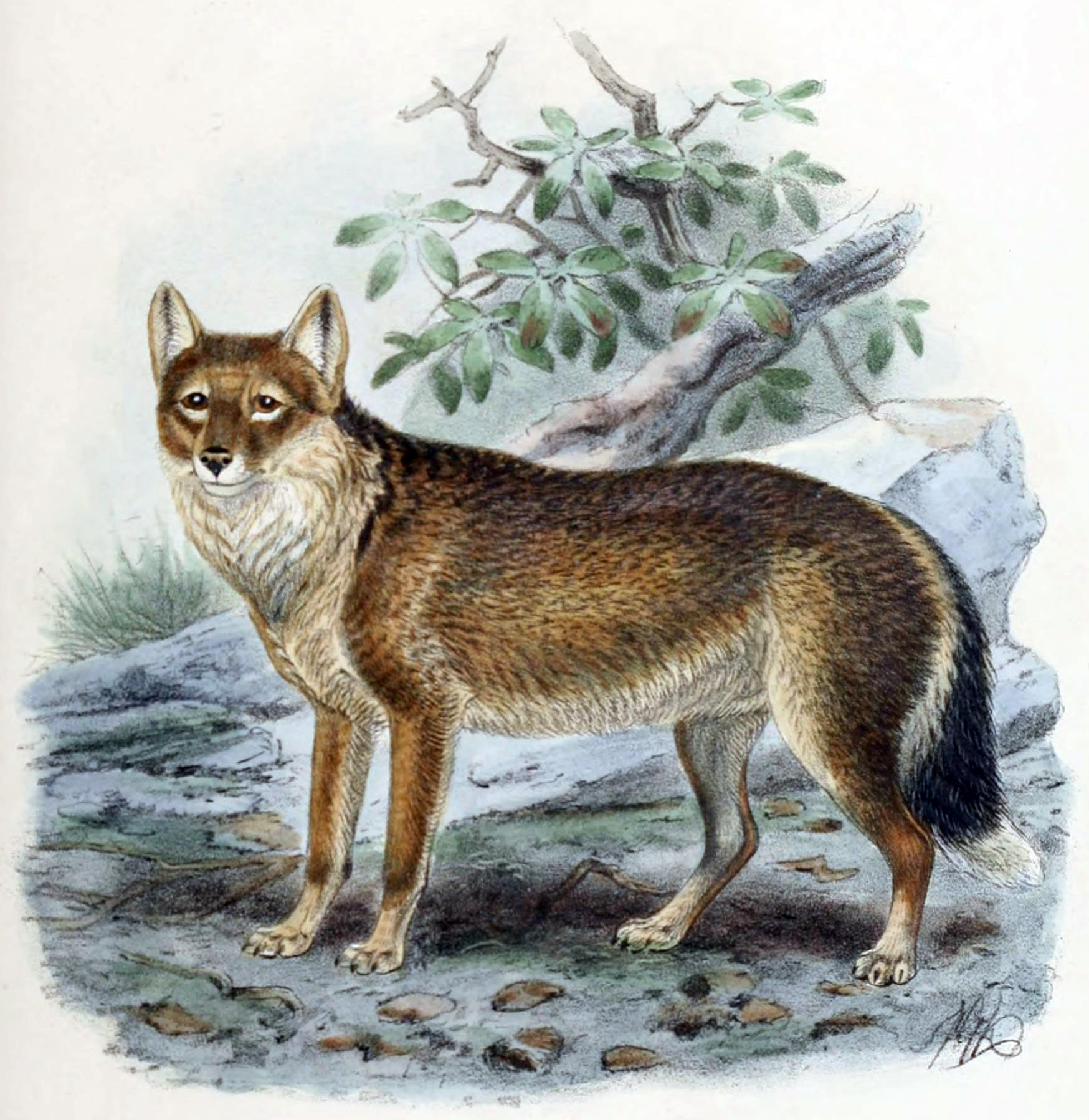
The warrah – now extinct – was the only native land mammal found on the islands upon their discovery by Europeans.

The wildlife of the Falkland Islands is quite similar to that of Patagonia. The Falkland Islands have no native reptiles or amphibians, and the only native land mammal, the warrah, is now extinct. However, a large number of bird species have been seen around the islands, and many of them breed on the smaller islands of the archipelago. Insects play a large role in the ecosystem of the islands, and over 200 species have been recorded. The waters around the Falkland Islands sustain many animals, including a large number of marine mammals. Three pinniped species breed on the islands.

There are no trees native to the area, leading to a wide proliferation of grass species. This includes tussac grass, the dense leaves of which provide a micro-climate for many bird and invertebrate species. Small bushes are also found, along with a small number of freshwater plants. The plant species vary with different factors such as the fertility of the soil, the humidity, and altitude.

There is a lack of data about many species in the islands, as well as a lack of long-term data about the environment. Introduced animals are having a detrimental effect on native wildlife, which is now mainly restricted to smaller offshore islands. Some native animals are protected, but many are not, due to a lack of information about them.

== Ecological zones and habitats ==
The Falkland Islands are an archipelago located some 650 km (400 mi) off South America in the south Atlantic Ocean. Biogeographically, the Falkland Islands are classified as part of the Antarctic ecozone and Antarctic Floristic Kingdom. Strong connections exist with the flora and fauna of Patagonia in South America, especially to those in Tierra del Fuego. As the Falkland Islands were originally connected to the African rather than South American mainland, the connections with Patagonia suggest wildlife on the islands arrived through dispersal.

There are two main islands in the archipelago, East Falkland and West Falkland, along with over 700 smaller ones. 19 land habitats are recognised. The soil types in the island vary, due to the relative dryness of the west compared to the east and differences in altitude. Many coastal areas have tussac grass, which needs high humidity and salty air to flourish. Inland habitats are often heath, either grass or shrubs, or feldmark made of cushion plants. Lowlands have acidic peaty soil with a low fertility. These lowlands support grass in wetter areas, but only shrubs in the drier areas. In the areas with high nutrient levels, the lowlands can support turf, however most peat is very shallow and lies on top of clay. Mountain vegetation consists mainly of cushion plants, moss and lichen dominated heaths.

== Fauna ==
Sunrise at Cowbay, Falkland Islands.

The bewitching beauty of Sunrise time at Cowbay of Falkland Islands. King penguins on the grassy slope of Saunders Island. Striated caracara at Saunders Island.

The archipelago had only one terrestrial mammal upon the arrival of Europeans, the Falkland Islands wolf (also known as warrah), found on both major islands. It was traditionally thought that Patagonian Indians once brought the warrah to the islands as a hunting dog. However, a 2009 DNA study by scientists at UCLA suggested that the warrah arrived on the islands long before humans migrated to the New World. It possibly arrived through crossing an ice-bridge at a time of low sea-levels, such as particularly cold periods 340,000 years ago, 150,000 years ago or 25,000 years ago. Its nearest relative was the maned wolf, an extant South American canid. It became extinct in the mid-19th century as human settlement spread. Fourteen species of marine mammals including killer whales, Peale's dolphins, Commerson's dolphins, leopard seals, southern elephant seals, and southern sea lions frequent the surrounding waters. Elephant seals, fur seals, and sea lions all breed on the islands, and the largest elephant seal breeding site has over 500 animals in it. Other species, especially cetaceans, are also sometimes seen. Populations of large whales, drastically reduced by illegal whaling carried out by the Soviet Union until the late 1970s, are now recovering. These include southern right whales, humpback whales, blue whales, fin whales, sei whales, and sperm whales.

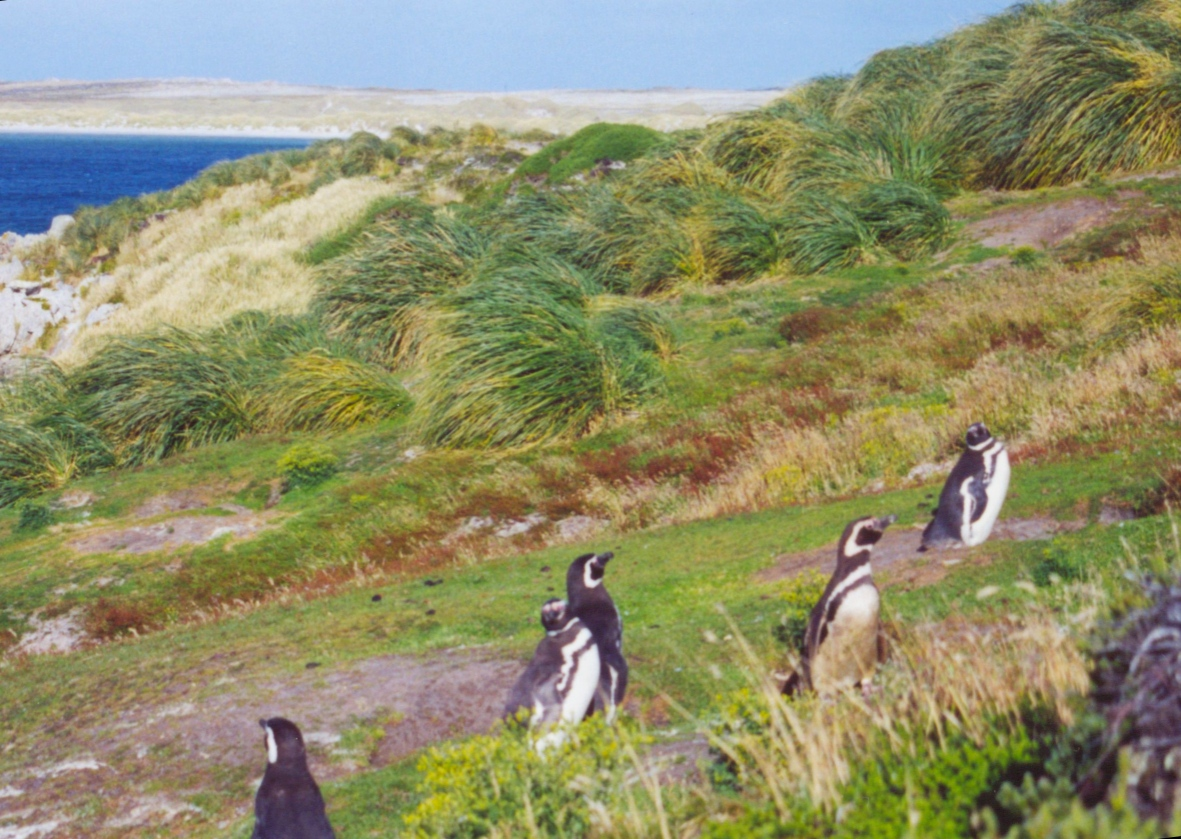
Magellanic penguins at Gypsy Cove King penguin pair at Cowbay. A large gentoo penguin colony near Volunteer Point.

227 bird species have been seen on the islands, over 60 of which are known to breed on the islands. 21 of the resident species are land birds, and 18 are water birds. There are 22 species of seabirds which breed on the islands, and at least 18 annual migrators who breed elsewhere. There are two endemic species of bird (the Falkland steamer duck and Cobb's wren), and 14 endemic subspecies.

King penguins at Cowbay.

There are five penguin species breeding on the islands, king penguins, southern rockhopper penguins, Magellanic penguins, gentoo penguins, and macaroni penguins. Approximately 494,500 breeding pairs are thought to live on the island, 500 of which are king penguins. Five other species have been recorded, but do not have a breeding population. The largest breeding population of black-browed albatross is found on the islands, making up over 80% of the world's black-browed albatross population.

Flight of an Albatross at Saunders Island.

This is the only breeding species of albatross, although nine others have been recorded. Many species of petrel also nest on the Falklands. Most remaining bird colonies exist on remote offshore islands.

Inland, upland and ruddy-headed geese live near small freshwater ponds, along with silver teal, Chiloé wigeon, and white-tufted grebe. There are six species of herons and egrets that have been recorded, although only the black-crowned night heron is known to breed in the area.

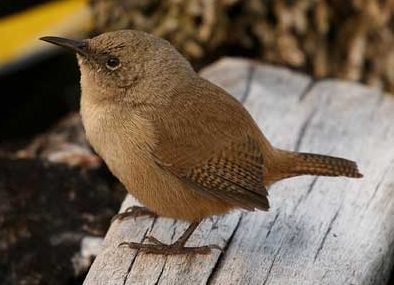
The Cobb's wren (Troglodytes cobbi), one of only two endemic bird species found on the Falkland Islands

There are no native reptiles or amphibians on the islands. Over 200 species of insects have been recorded, along with 43 spider species and 12 worm species. Over 60 species of true flies live on the islands, 12 species of wasps, and 20 species of butterflies and moths. There is a high diversity of beetles species, with 110 species of which 15 are ground beetles, 20 are weevils, and 16 are darkling beetles. There are 15 species of hemiptera, and 12 booklice. Only 13 terrestrial invertebrates are recognised as endemic, although information on many species in lacking and it is suspected up to two thirds of species found are actually endemic, including 16 spiders. Insects are important as decomposers, and also make up a large portion of the diet of some bird species. Due to the island environment, many insect species have developed reduced or absent wings. There are around 129 freshwater invertebrates, the majority being rotifer, however the identification of some species remains in dispute.

Six species of fish are found in freshwater areas including the zebra trout (Aplochiton zebra), the Falklands minnow (a.k.a. common galaxias, Galaxias maculatus), which is among the most widespread fishes in the world. Many of these native species are amphidromous, spending part of their lives at sea. Introduced brown trout, have been established in many freshwater streams and have also formed sea-runs resulting in an increase in body size. Due to the introduction of brown trout and other fish species the endemic zebra trout (a galaxiid fish unrelated to typical salmonid trout) is now restricted to small streams in remote parts of West Falkland and Lafonia. Different species of krill are found in Falkland waters, with lobster krill inhabiting the warmer waters in the north.

== Flora ==
Vegetation on the archipelago is composed of grasses, ferns, and shrubs. Around 363 species of vascular plants have been recorded on the island, 171 of which are native and 13 of which are endemic. 21 species of ferns and clubmosses are recorded, and 278 species of flowering plants have been recorded. There are no native tree species, although there are two species of bushes, fachine and native box. Some bogs and fens exist, freshwater plants include the soft-camp bog (Astelia pumila), dwarf marigold (Caltha appendiculata), gaimardia (Gaimardia australis) and the carnivorous sundew Drosera uniflora.

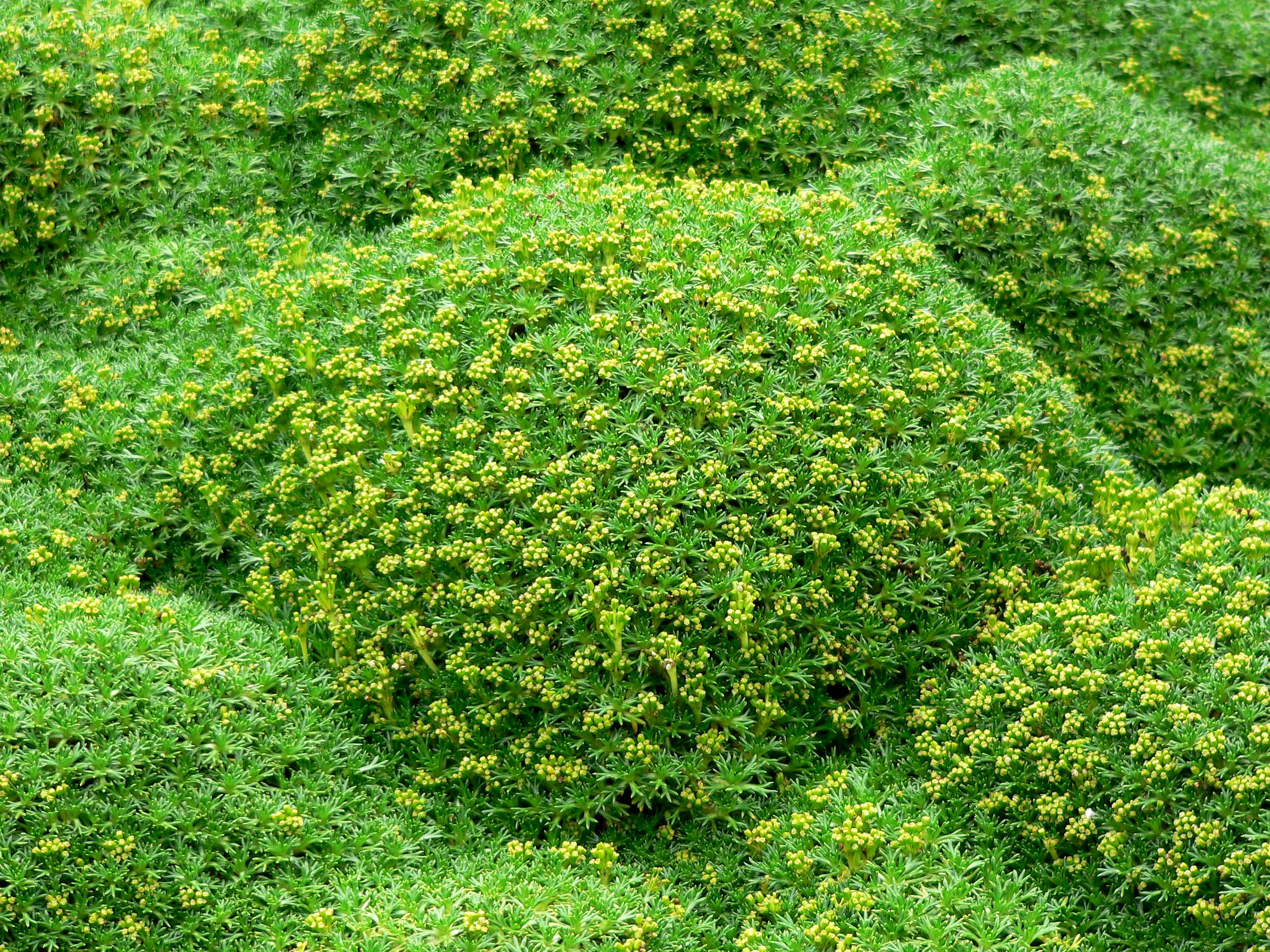
Bolax gummifera

Tussac grass, which averages 2 m (6.6 ft) in height but can reach up to 4 m (13 ft), consists of a tussock of vegetation around a fibrous central pedestal. They are known to live for over 200 years, and can become large enough for birds to nest on. Due to the need for high humidity and salty air, tussac grass is not found more than 300 m (1,000 ft) from the coast, causing it to form bands around larger islands. The dead leaves that accumulate in these areas make them highly fertile, although few other species can grow due to the density of the grass. The dense canopies formed create an insulated micro-climate suitable for many birds and invertebrates.

Heath is found commonly inland, made up of either grass or shrubs. The most common grass species is whitegrass (Cortaderia pilosa) which covers the majority of the main islands. These grasses support other flowering plants, along with insects and birds. The shrub heath is composed mostly of low-growing shrubs such as diddle-dee (Empetrum rubrum), and also hosts many other plant species along with invertebrates and small birds. In the feldmark environments formed on exposed ridges and higher areas, cushion plants such as balsam bog (Bolax gummifera). Species of fern can also grow in such areas. In the most extreme areas, only lichen and specialised plants such as snakeplants (Nassauvia serpens) can grow.} More than 400 species of lichens and lichen-dwelling fungi in 161 genera have been recorded from the island. Teaberry (Myrteola nummularia) grows in marshy areas.

The pale maiden (Olsynium filifolium) is the Falkland Island's proposed national flower.

== Issues and introduced species ==
There is little long-term data on habitat changes, so the extent of human impact is unclear, although threats such as invasive species and camp burning are recognised. Vegetation such as tussac grass, fachine, and native box have been heavily affected by introduced grazing animals. Tussac grass now exists in only 20% of its former range, mostly offshore islands, as a result of its extreme sensitivity. Many breeding birds similarly live only on offshore islands, where introduced animals, such as cats and rats, are not found. The only native terrestrial mammal, the warrah, was wiped out in the mid-19th century.

Wildlife tourism is growing, and steps are being taken to protect the wildlife of the islands. Some protection exists under the Conservation of Wildlife and Nature Ordinance 1999. Only two bird species lack legal protection. One fish species, the zebra trout, is protected. Amid a lack of information on invertebrates, legislation exists to protect only butterflies.

Virtually the entire area of the islands is used as pasture for sheep. There is also an introduced reindeer population, which was brought to the islands in 2001 for commercial purposes. Rats have been introduced in the area, and guanacos were introduced south of Mount Pleasant in 1862 so Prince Alfred could hunt them in 1871. However, the introduction was generally unsuccessful, and they died out everywhere except Staats Island. South American gray foxes were introduced and are having a detrimental impact on birds that nest on the shores, as are feral cats. A number of invertebrate species have been introduced since the arrival of Europeans, some filling niches that were not previously filled. House sparrows and domestic geese are the only introduced bird species. Introduced fish species exist, such as the brown trout. Twenty-two introduced plant species are thought to provide a significant threat to local flora.

The climate and soil composition, combined with limited knowledge and inadequate protection have meant that past attempts to establish trees on the islands have not been very successful, although various attempts have been made over the past 80 years. Having trees in place to disrupt the cold winds of the islands would positively impact sheep farming, improving lamb survival rates and help with recovery from stress. It could also allow for some crops to be farmed, providing shelter and enhancing soil quality. A 1983 study determined that it may be possible to plant trees for wind shelter, although imported stock would have to be used as it was impractical to raise sufficient numbers on the islands. A small number of sizeable plots exist, but they are largely confined to sites near houses and gardens.

There are a small number of significant stands of introduced trees on the islands, primarily the Monterey cypress. The Hill Cove Forest (51.506°S 60.148°W) was established in the 1880s and occupies approximately 2 hectares. The 1982 Memorial Wood 51.6945°S 57.846°W) at Port Stanley contains 255 trees, one for each UK serviceman killed in the Falklands War. There is also a stand of Monterey cypress and New Zealand cabbage palms at Port Patterson on Carcass Island.

== See also ==
- SubAntarctic Foundation for Ecosystems Research
