= Steeple Jason Island =

Steeple Jason
- Island
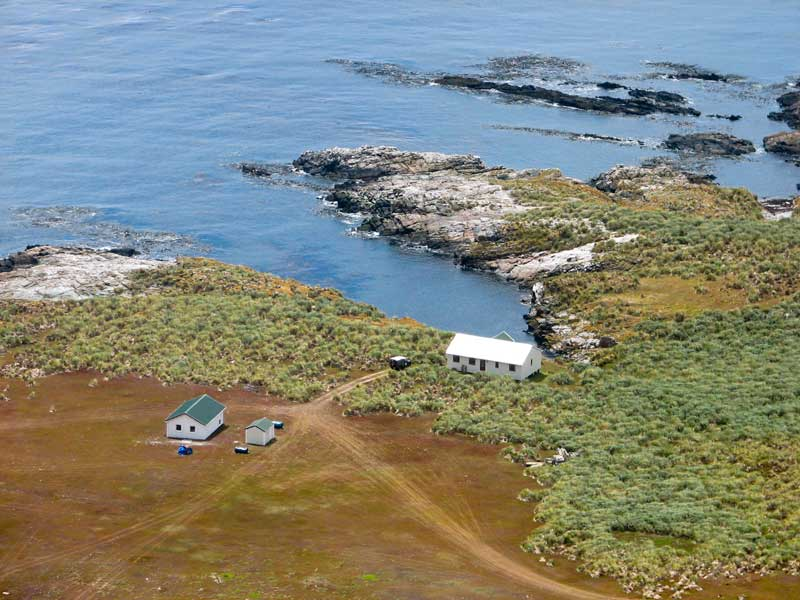

- Steeple Jason shown within the Falkland Islands
- Coordinates: 51°02′15″S 61°12′35″W
- Country: Falkland Islands
- Island group: Jason Islands
- Named for: English: Refers to pointed profile of island

Area
  - Total: 8.72 km^{2} (3.37 sq mi)

Population (2001)
  - Total: 0
  - Density: 0.0/km^{2} (0.0/sq mi)
- Time zone: UTC−3 (FKST)
- If shown, area and population ranks are for all islands and all inhabited islands in the Falklands respectively.

Steeple Jason Island is a small island west of Grand Jason Island. It is a part of the Jason Islands in the Falkland Islands. Along with Grand Jason, it is one of the "Islas los Salvejes" in Spanish (the Jasons being divided into two groups in that language).

== Population and geography ==
None of the Jason Islands has ever been properly inhabited. Steeple Jason was used for sheep grazing up until the 1970s. There are the remains of a shearing shed on the island. There is also Steinhardt Station, a field research station on the island, built in 2003 for monitoring wildlife.

The island is surrounded by low-lying land around the shore which quickly rises to a steep peak, hence the island's name.

In a 1974 documentary made by World in Action on UK Television, titled “Len Hill - Penguin Millionaire” the filmmaker's followed Len Hill who started a Bird Sanctuary in Bourton-on-the-Water, England, called Birdland, to this Island. Len had bought this island in 1970, and the adjacent Grand Jason island to preserve as a sanctuary for Penguins, birds and other wildlife on the Islands. The sheep were removed from the island at this time.

The island along with Grand Jason was bought in 1993 by New York philanthropist Michael Steinhardt, who later donated it to the Bronx Zoo-based Wildlife Conservation Society. In 2001, a devasting fire swept across the island after some ordnance left over form the Falklands War was detonated by the British military.

== Wildlife ==
Steeple Jason is home to the largest colony of black-browed albatrosses in the world. Over 70% of the global population of black-browed albatross breed in the Falkland Islands.

Other birdlife includes southern rockhopper penguins, Magellanic penguins, gentoo penguins, slender-billed prions, striated caracaras and tussac-birds. The Magellanic penguin is near the southern part of its range here, but the more cold-tolerant gentoo also occurs substantially south into Antarctica. The sole native mammalian life is marine, e.g. sea lions and fur seals.

Large beds of kelp surround the island, and the land is covered in grasses common to the other Falkland Islands, such as tussac grass.

Birds and other wildlife on Steeple Jason Island are in many cases under threat, chiefly due to overfishing in the South Atlantic Ocean over the last century, and invasive house mice (Mus musculus) that predate on ground nesting seabirds and their eggs. Mouse eradication has been studied.
