= Safer =

Safer or SAFER may refer to:

- FSO Safer, a Yemeni floating oil storage and offloading vessel
- Safer (surname)
- Safar or safer, the second month of the Islamic calendar
- Safer, a plastic box with integrated electronic article surveillance technology used in retail
- As an acronym:
  - SAFER, an initiative of the World Health Organization about alcohol and health
  - Safer Alternative for Enjoyable Recreation, a Denver-based marijuana legalization effort
  - Secure and Fast Encryption Routine, a family of block ciphers
  - Simplified Aid For EVA Rescue, a propulsive backpack system
  - Social Aid for the Elimination of Rape, a Canadian humanitarian organisation
  - Steel and Foam Energy Reduction Barrier, a racing technology intended to reduce injuries in accidents
  - SubAntarctic Foundation for Ecosystems Research
