= Flat Jason Island =

Island of the Falkland Islands

Flat Jason
- Island
- Flat Jason shown within the Falkland Islands
- Coordinates: 51.105°S 60.888°W
- Country: Falkland Islands
- Island group: Jason Islands
- Time zone: UTC−3 (FKST)
- If shown, area and population ranks are for all islands and all inhabited islands in the Falklands respectively.

Flat Jason is one of the Jason Islands in the north west Falkland Islands. In Spanish, it is considered one of "Islas las Llaves" (eastern, Seal Rocks and North Fur Island). The island covers an area of 4 square kilometres (1.5 sq mi), and is at its maximum it is only 600 metres (2,000 ft) wide, though it is 6 kilometres (3.7 mi) long. The Anglicized name of the island group stems from HMS Jason, a frigate of the Royal Navy that arrived at Port Egmont on West Falkland in January 1765. Originally the Jason islands were first recorded by a Dutch navigator, Seebald de Weert, who named them after himself (the Sebald [sic] Islands). Flat Jason lies 5 kilometres (3 mi) to the south-west of Grand Jason.

In June 1793, a ship named Argyllshire was wrecked on Flat Jason, though its crew managed to get to safety.

In 1964, a government ordinance declared the island a nature reserve, which was conferred on the island officially in 1966. The island is noted for its population of South American Fur Seals, breeding sea lions, and the island has a population of metridium senile, a sea anemone which is native to the northern hemisphere. The island is listed as having 32 different bird species located there, of which 26 were breeding. Striated caracara (phalcoboenus australis) have bred on the island with an average of 20 breeding pairs in the 1980s, 34 in the 1990s, 26 in the 2000s, and 28 pairs in the 2010s. Flat Jason, which is a tussac-covered island, has never had any grazing cattle or sheep located there, possibly due to the access to the island being difficult. Lesser swine-cress (lepidium didymum) has been noted on the island.
