= Dunbar Island =

- Island
- Dunbar Island shown within the Falkland Islands
- Coordinates: 51.364°S 60.389°W
- Country: Falkland Islands

Area
  - Total: 2.25 km^{2} (0.87 sq mi)

Population (2001)
  - Total: 0
  - Density: 0.0/km^{2} (0.0/sq mi)
- Time zone: UTC−3 (FKST)
- If shown, area and population ranks are for all islands and all inhabited islands in the Falklands respectively.

Dunbar Island is part of the West Point Island Group of the Falkland Islands. It is near West Falkland, to its north, in Byron Sound. It is east of Carcass Island and Low Island and to the west of Saunders Island. It is south of Sedge Island and north of the Byron Heights and Storm Mountain.

The island's land area is 2.25 square kilometres (0.87 sq mi).
