= MacBride Head =

Most northeasterly point of the Falkland Islands

Coordinates: 51.3634°S 57.9473°W

East and West Falkland

MacBride (or Macbride) Head is the most northeasterly point of the Falkland Islands, and is on East Falkland. Mount MacBride is just to its south. There is a sea lion colony here.

It takes its name from Capt. John MacBride, the man credited with settling Saunders Island, who commanded the vessels HMS Jason and HMS Carcass, which in turn gave their names to the Jason Islands and Carcass Island.
