= Carcass Island =

- Island
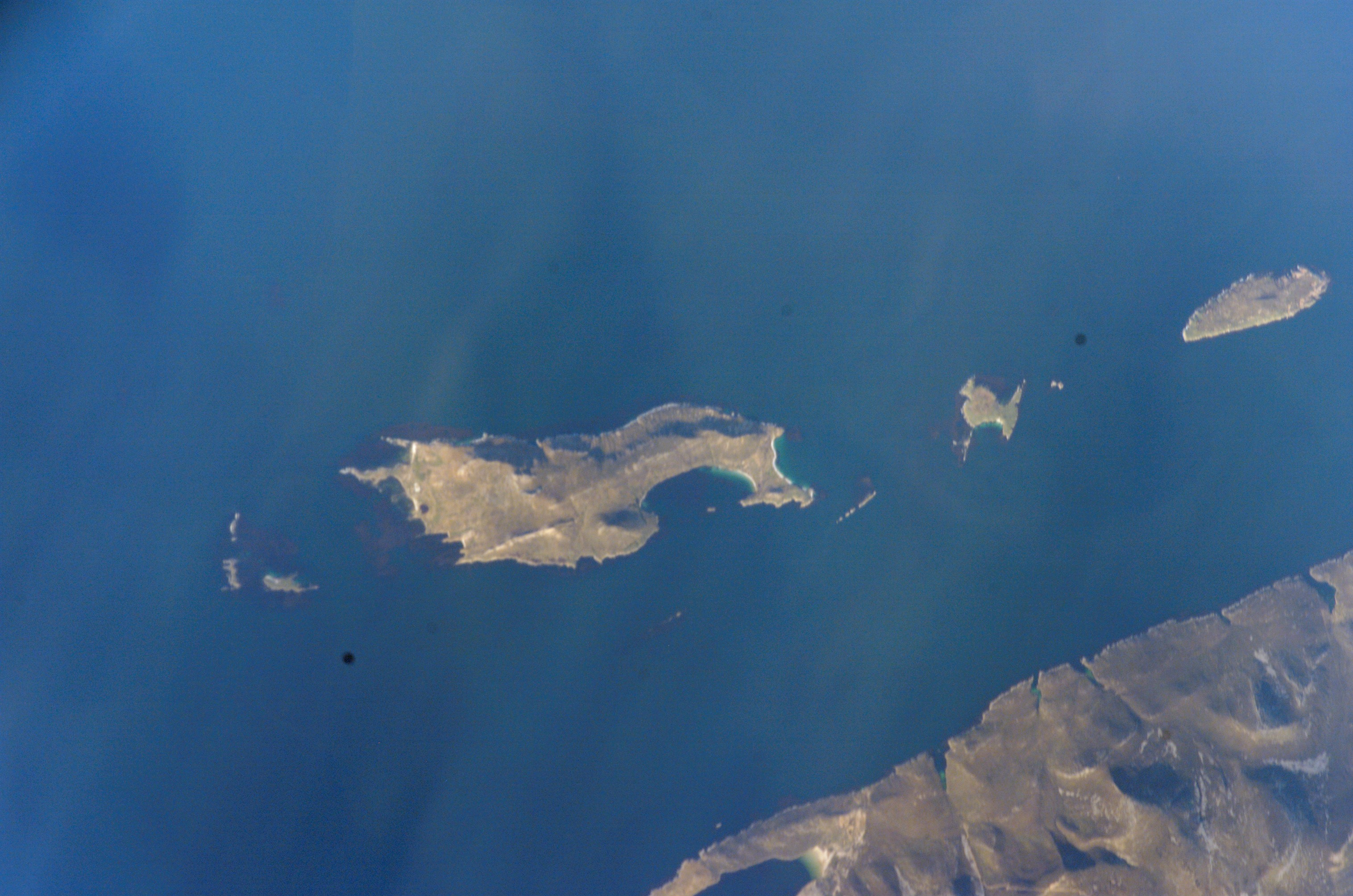

- Carcass Island shown within the Falkland Islands
- Coordinates: 51°16′50″S 60°33′45″W
- Country: Falkland Islands (UK)
- Named for: English: "Carcass" after ship Spanish: Island of the Rosary
- Main settlement: Port Patterson

Area
  - Total: 7.31 sq mi (18.94 km^{2})
- Highest elevation (Mount Byng): 720 ft (220 m)
- Time zone: UTC−3 (FKST)
- If shown, area and population ranks are for all islands and all inhabited islands in the Falklands respectively.

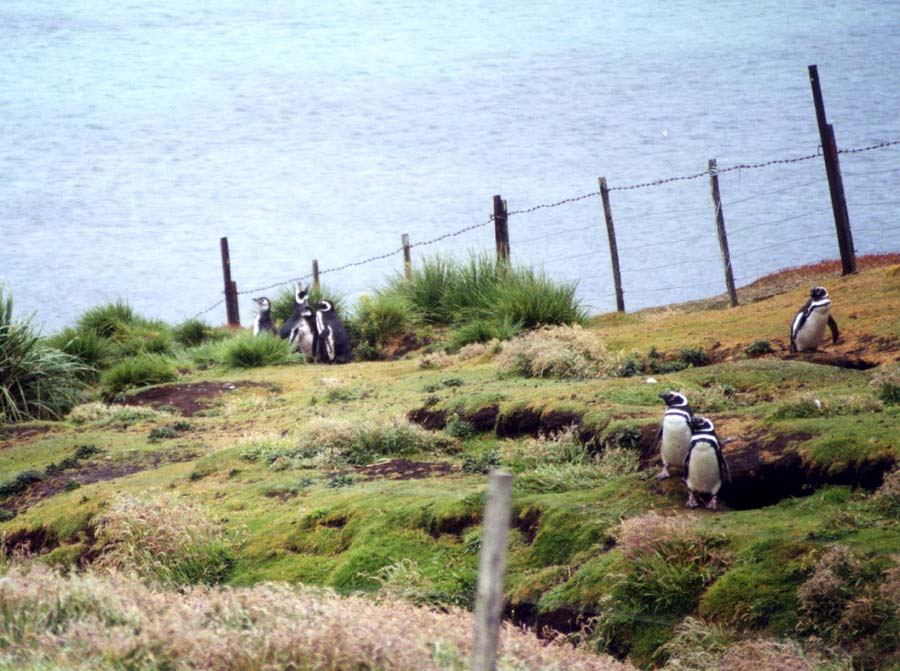
Penguin burrows are often fenced to protect sheep from injury.

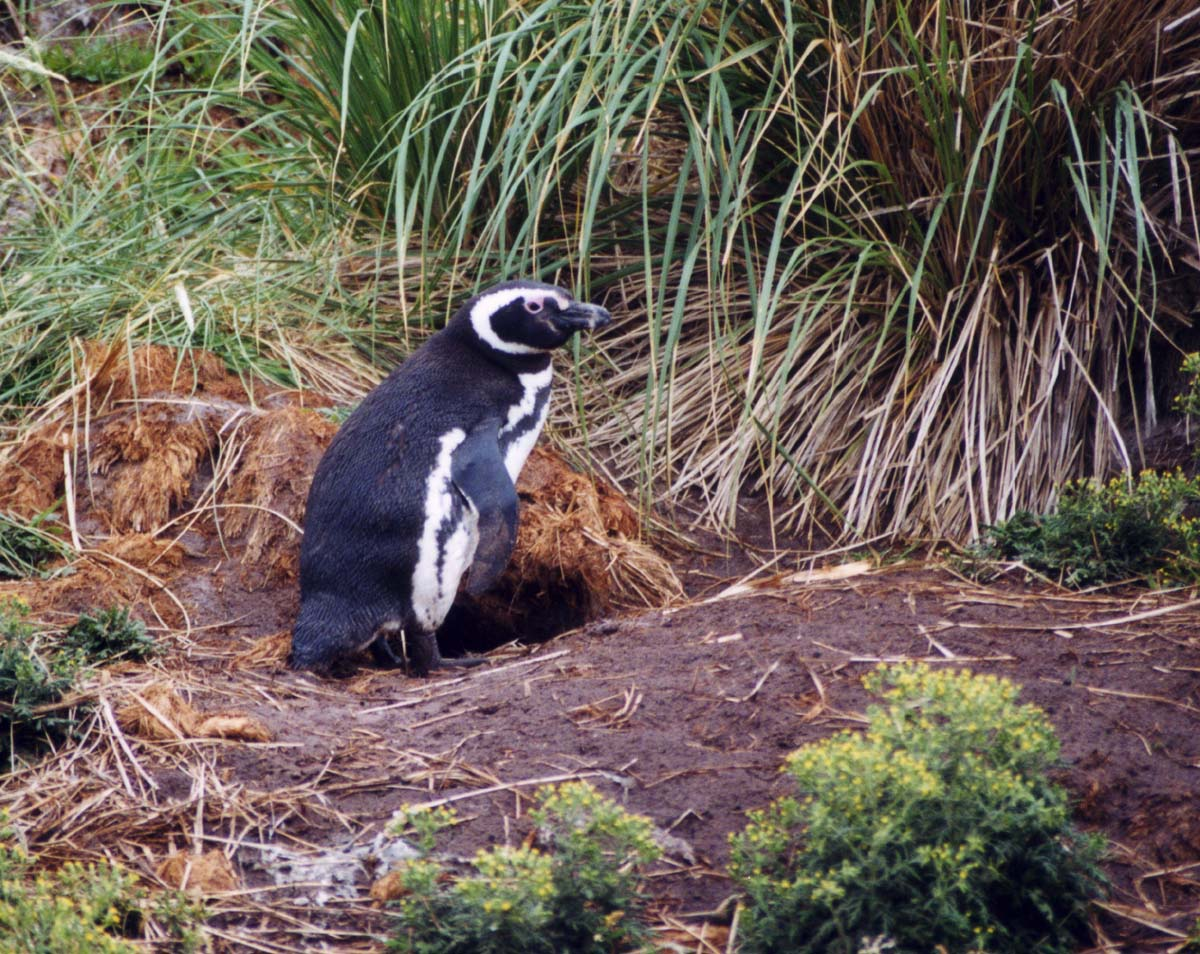
Penguin guarding burrow

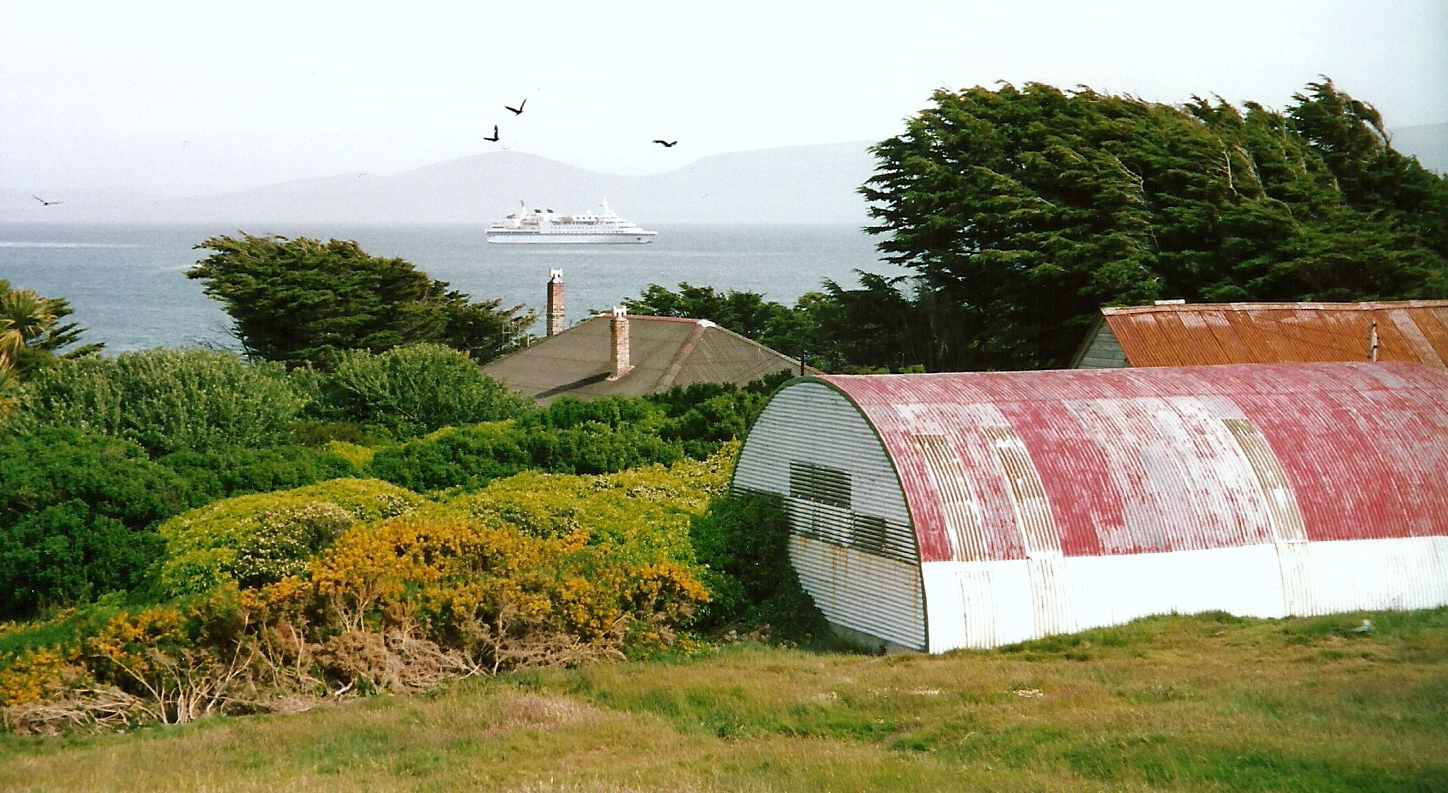
Forest on Carcass Island

Carcass Island (Spanish: Isla del Rosario) is the largest of the West Point Island Group of the Falkland Islands.

== Description ==
It lies north-west of West Falkland and south-east of the Jason Islands. It is 10 km (6.2 mi) in length, has a maximum width of 2.5 km (1.6 mi), and is 19 km^{2} (7.3 sq mi) in area. The highest points of the island are Stanley Hill and Mount Byng at 220 m (720 ft). The north-eastern coast has cliffs and slopes while there are large sand bays and a tidal rocky point to the north-west. There are also stretches of duneland. Leopard Beach is often used as a landing point.

== History ==
The island's grim-sounding name comes from the ship HMS Carcass, which surveyed the island in 1766. Its accompanying vessel, HMS Jason, gave its name to the nearby Jason Islands, and its captain, John MacBride, gave his name to MacBride Head.

It has been run as a sheep farm for over a century and is owned by R. P. McGill. The island's three heritage-listed buildings are a boathouse, shed and store. Its small settlement lying on Port Patterson on the southwest coast is also known for its gardens and has a small grocery shop.

Carcass Island was considered as one of the potential sites for a British amphibious landing during the Falklands War; however, the British landings took place on San Carlos Water in the west of East Falkland, on Falkland Sound. The plan would have been for a "stone aircraft carrier". The main objections to this plan were threefold: 1) Carcass Island, being in the west of the archipelago, was nearest to continental Argentine bases; 2) its proximity to the airbase on Pebble Island; and 3) its remoteness from Stanley, as it was furthest from the main objectives, and West Falkland was ultimately bypassed in the war.

== Flora and fauna ==
Though the island has been a sheep farm for more than a century, careful management has preserved its varied habitat and mature tussac grows in replanted coastal paddocks. The island contains one of the few substantial stands of trees in the Falklands. There is however, a true wood at Hill Cove. None of the species are endemic, but they include such exoticisms as Monterey cypress trees and New Zealand cabbage palms. The night herons nest within these trees. The gardens also include other introduced plants such as fuchsias, lupins and dog roses.

The island has no rats or cats, and as a result has a wide variety of birdlife including black-crowned night herons, known in the Falkland Islands as "quarks", as well as seals and penguins. The several substantial freshwater ponds are important waterfowl sites.

The West Point Island group, which includes Carcass Island, has been identified by BirdLife International as an Important Bird Area (IBA). Birds for which the site is of conservation significance include Falkland steamer ducks, ruddy-headed geese, gentoo penguins, southern rockhopper penguins, Magellanic penguins, black-browed albatrosses, striated caracaras, blackish cinclodes, Cobb's wrens and white-bridled finches.
