= Low Island, Falkland Islands =

Low Island
- Island
- Low Island shown within the Falkland Islands
- Coordinates: 51°20′05″S 60°28′00″W
- Country: Falkland Islands
- Time zone: UTC−3 (FKST)
- If shown, area and population ranks are for all islands and all inhabited islands in the Falklands respectively.

Low Island is one of the Falkland Islands. It is near West Falkland, to its north, in Byron Sound It is between Carcass Island and Dunbar Island and to the west of Saunders Island. It is south of Sedge Island and north of the Byron Heights and Storm Mountain.

It is not to be confused with Low Island north of Weddell Island.
