= Low Island =

A low island is an island of coral origin.

Low Island may refer to:

- Low Island, British Columbia, Canada
- Low Island, Falkland Islands
- Low Island, Manitoba, Canada
- Low Island, Nova Scotia, Canada
- Low Island (Nunavut), Frobisher Bay, Canada
- Low Island (Nunavut), Milne Inlet, Canada
- Low Island, Kenora, Ontario, Canada
- Low Island, Manitoulin, Ontario, Canada
- Low Island (Queensland) also known as Low Isle, one of the Low Isles
- Low Island (South Shetland Islands)
- Low Island (Washington), one of the San Juan Islands
- Inishloe, County Clare, Ireland

Low Islands may refer to:

- Low Islands, Newfoundland and Labrador, Canada
- Low Islands, Nunavut, Canada

Low Islets may refer to:

- Low Islets (Tasmania)
- Low Islets (Prime Seal Group), Tasmania

Other Low Islands:

- A. P. Low Island, Nunavut, Canada
- Bennets Low Island, Newfoundland and Labrador, Canada
- Low Duck Island, New Brunswick, Canada
- Low Shoal Island, Ontario, Canada
- South Low Island, British Columbia, Canada

== See also ==
- Barrier island
- Sand bar
- Shoal
- Low (disambiguation)
