= Elephant Jason Island =

One of the Jason Islands in the Falkland Islands

Elephant Jason Pan de Azucar
- Island
- Elephant Jason shown within the Falkland Islands
- Coordinates: 51.16°S 60.85°W
- Country: Falkland Islands
- Island group: Jason Islands
- Named for: English: Island of elephant seals

Area
  - Total: 2.6 km^{2} (1.0 sq mi)
- Time zone: UTC−3 (FKST)
- If shown, area and population ranks are for all islands and all inhabited islands in the Falklands respectively.

Elephant Jason is one of the Jason Islands in the north west Falkland Islands. In Spanish, it is considered one of the "Islas las Llaves" (eastern, Seal Rocks and North Fur Island); such a distinction does not exist in English between the two groups of the islands. It is named for the southern elephant seals and the survey vessel HMS Jason.

The island has no airstrips, and is primarily reached by boat. The island is around 2.5 square kilometres, rockhopper penguins and black-browed albatrosses are found in significant numbers on the island.

== History ==
In 1922, after the island had been identified as an important source of fur seals, which were economically important due to the value of their pelts, an expedition sailed to Elephant Jason Island, to establish an armed guard, showing how seriously seal populations were being protected at the time. Landing was delayed by bad weather, and once ashore they had to cut through dense tussac grass up to 10 feet high over boggy ground, making movement and transport extremely difficult. Even so, they managed to haul supplies inland and build a guardhouse within about ten days. Most strikingly, the island was heavily armed: ammunition stores were built, a machine gun installed, and even a 12-pounder field gun was dragged across the terrain to a defensive position.

== Ecology ==
Elephant Jason was designated a national nature reserve in 1973, it is part of the Jason Islands Group Important Bird Area. A 2005 aerial count recorded 1,302 breeding pairs of Black-browed Albatrosses on Elephant Jason. By 2010, this had risen to 1,822 pairs, an increase consistent with trends across the Falkland Islands (Islas Malvinas). Despite this, growth at Elephant Jason has been slower than at other colonies in the Jason Island Group, possibly because the dry terrain limits new nest formation. Meanwhile, the colony on nearby South Jason Island is among the fastest expanding, with its wet, muddy ground fed by springs providing more favourable conditions.

Elephant Jason within the Jason Islands (Falkland Islands)
