= Sedge Island =

Sedge Island Isla Culebra
- Island
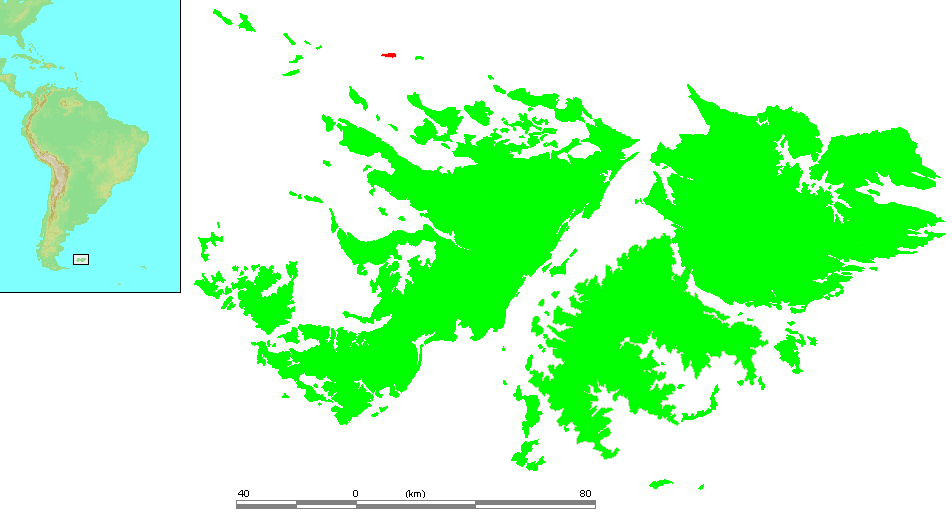
- Coordinates: 51.149°S 60.408°W
- Country: Falkland Islands

Area
  - Total: 3.8 km^{2} (1.5 sq mi)
- Time zone: UTC−3 (FKST)
- If shown, area and population ranks are for all islands and all inhabited islands in the Falklands respectively.

Sedge Island (Spanish: Isla Culebra) is one of the islands of the Falkland archipelago. Something of an outlier, it is due north of the large island of West Falkland and to the east of the Jason Islands. It is north east of Carcass Island and north west of Saunders Island. It is low-lying and covered in grass and tussock, including the sedges which give it its name.

In 1978, Sedge Island was owned by Walter "Wally" McBeth, who tried to settle there with his wife and two daughters. He planned to build a small airstrip for FIGAS but this did not happen. He did however set up an unsuccessful sheep farm, first with a hut that he floated onto the island, and then a prefabricated house, which has three bedrooms.

In 1985, it was acquired by David Hawksworth, who has owned it ever since.
