= Bolax bovei =

Scientific classification
- Kingdom: Plantae
- Clade: Tracheophytes
- Clade: Angiosperms
- Clade: Eudicots
- Clade: Asterids
- Order: Apiales
- Family: Apiaceae
- Genus: Bolax
- Species: B. bovei

Binomial name
- Bolax bovei (Speg.) Dusén

Synonyms
- Azorella bovei Speg.; Azorella gummifera Poir.; Bolax caespitosa Hombr. & Jacquinot ex Decne.

Species of flowering plant

Bolax bovei is a species of flowering plant in the genus Bolax.
