= South Jason Island =

Island of the Falkland Islands

South Jason Islas las Llaves
- Island
- Coordinates: 51.204°S 60.883°W
- Country: Falkland Islands
- Island group: Jason Islands

Area
  - Total: 3.75 km^{2} (1.45 sq mi)
- Time zone: UTC−3 (FKST)
- If shown, area and population ranks are for all islands and all inhabited islands in the Falklands respectively.

South Jason is an island north west of West Falkland in the Falkland Isles. It is part of the Jason Islands group, and is considered a group alongside other islands as "Islas las Llaves" in the Spanish language. The island has breeding colonies of seabirds, which were threatened by a fire started accidentally by the British military in 2001.

== History ==
South Jason is one of the Jason Islands in the north west Falkland Islands. In Spanish it is considered one of "Islas las Llaves" (eastern, Seal Rocks and North Fur Island). Such a distinction doesn't exist in English between the two groups of the islands. South Jason is a narrow island some 7 kilometres (4.3 mi) long and 1.6 kilometres (1 mi) wide, covering an area of 375 hectares (930 acres), with its highest peak at 288 metres (945 ft) above sea level.

It is north west of Westpoint Island. In 1912, the lease on South Jason expired and the island became a Crown reserve.

== Wildlife ==
Fur seals and sea lions are known to use the island; in 2014, a total of 13 sea lion pups were counted, and by 2021, the breeding sea lions had 34 pups. Birdlife on the island includes black-browed albatrosses, rockhopper penguins, Magellanic penguins, prions and striated caracara.

== Falklands War ==
During the Falklands War, one Argentine McDonnell Douglas A-4C Skyhawk crashed on the island on 9 May 1982; the pilot, 1st Lt Jorge Casco was killed. On 12 January 2001 an EOD team visited the island to dispose of any live ordnance that had become apparent from the aircraft crash since their last annual visit. A fire was caused by the army engineers disposing of the ordnance, which swept across the island and devasted about 90% of the Tussac grass. The fire burned for five days and was thought to have caused many deaths in nesting birds on the island such as albatrosses and penguins. However, a report by conservationists released on 12 February 2011 stated that "..some nests were scorched around the edge of the colony but the majority of birds appeared to have had a very lucky escape." By 2008, the tussac grass had regrown.

The Jason Islands form part of the Falkland Islands, an archipelago in the South Atlantic Ocean, located 300 miles off the coast of Argentina.

The remains of Lt Casco were not found until after the war at 51°12′23″S 60°53′26″W. He was buried on 7 March 2009 in the Argentine Military Cemetery on East Falkland. Casco's family requested that his remains be buried on the Falklands, even after they had been returned to Argentina in July 2008 for DNA testing in order to confirm their identity.
