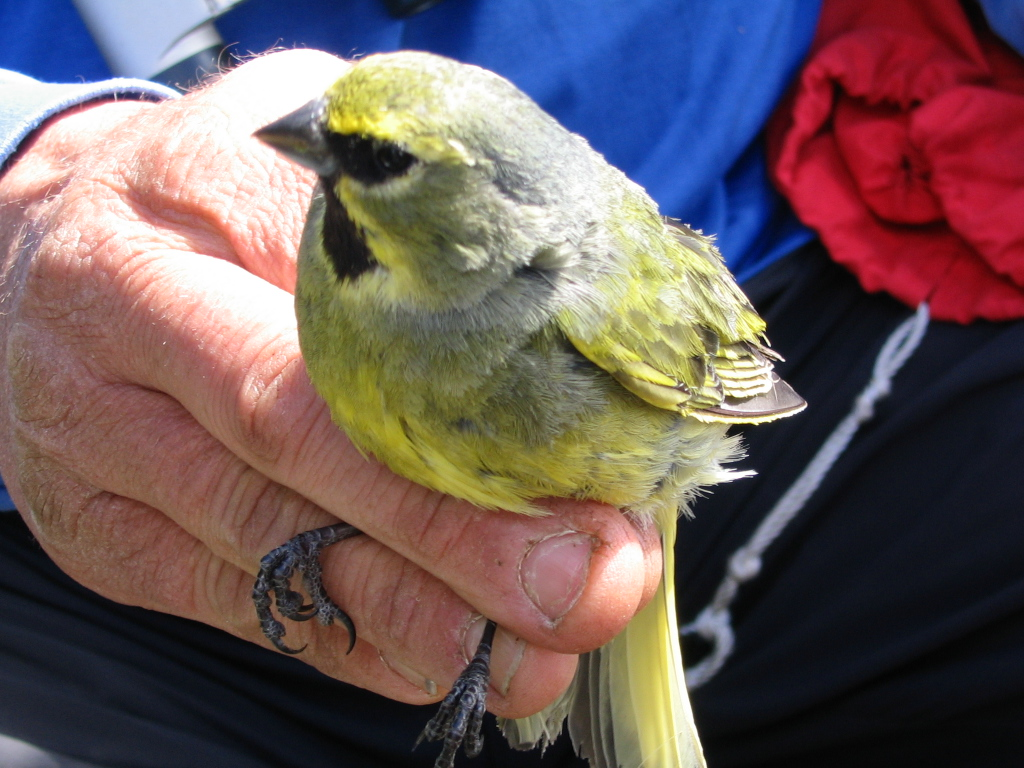
- Yellow-bridled finch being ringed in Chile.

Scientific classification
- Kingdom: Animalia
- Phylum: Chordata
- Class: Aves
- Order: Passeriformes
- Family: Thraupidae
- Genus: Melanodera; Bonaparte, 1850

Type species
- Emberiza melanodera Quoy & Gaimard, 1824

Species
- See text

= Melanodera =

Genus of birds

Melanodera is a genus of Patagonian seed-eating birds in the tanager family Thraupidae.

== Taxonomy and species list ==
The genus Melanodera was introduced in 1850 by the French naturalist Charles Lucien Bonaparte with the white-bridled finch (Melanodera melanodera) as the type species. The genus name combines the Ancient Greek melas meaning "black" and dera meaning "neck". The genus now contains two species.

Image	Common name	Scientific name	Distribution
	White-bridled finch or canary-winged finch	Melanodera melanodera	southern Argentina and Chile
	Yellow-bridled finch	Melanodera xanthogramma	Argentina and Chile
