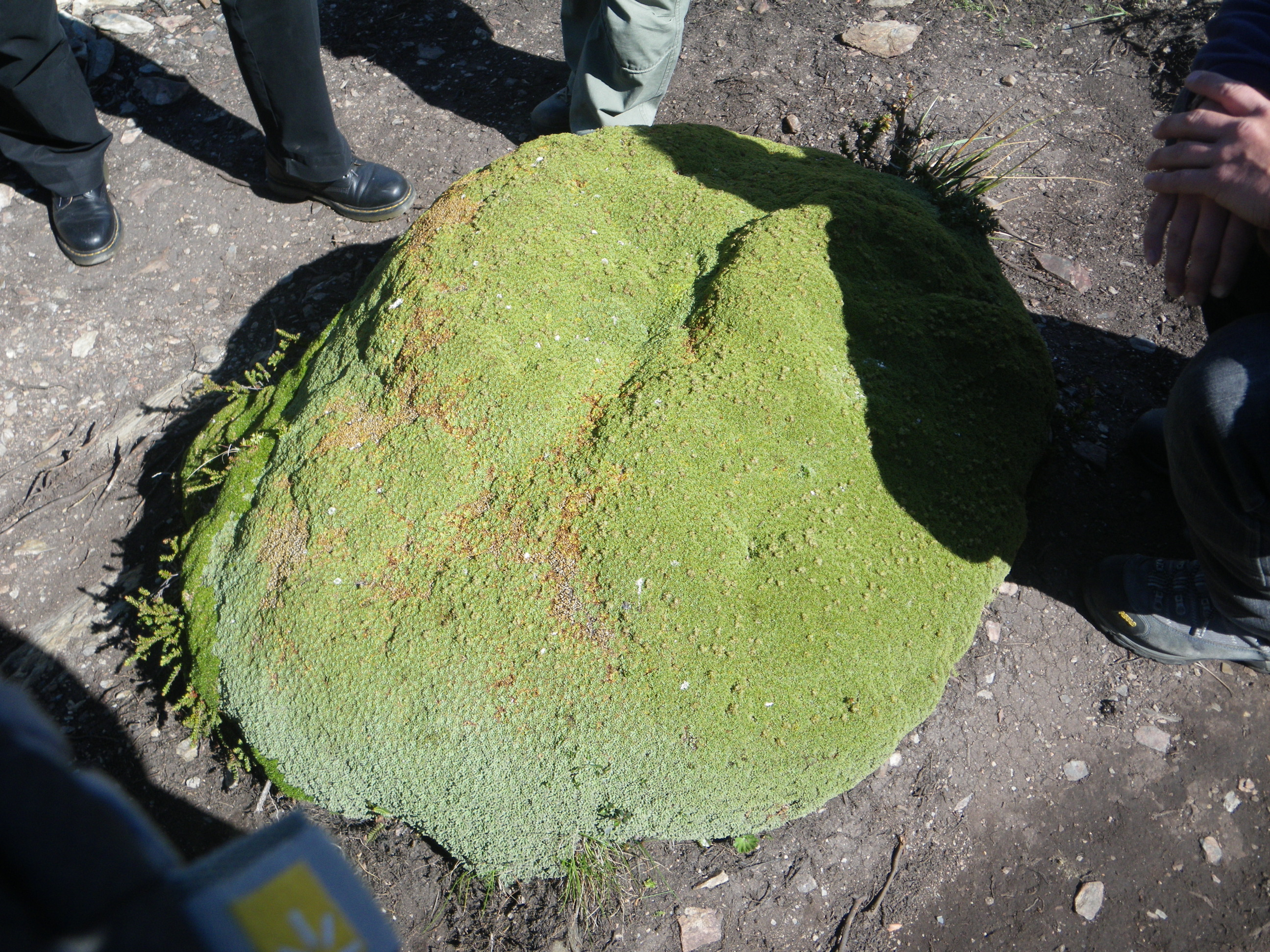
- Bolax gummifera, known as chareta

Scientific classification
- Kingdom: Plantae
- Clade: Tracheophytes
- Clade: Angiosperms
- Clade: Eudicots
- Clade: Asterids
- Order: Apiales
- Family: Apiaceae
- Subfamily: Azorelloideae
- Genus: Bolax; Comm. ex Juss.

Species
- Bolax bovei (Speg.) Dusén; Bolax gummifera (Lam.) Spreng.

= Bolax =

Genus of flowering plants

Bolax is a genus of flowering plant in the family Apiaceae. Two species are currently accepted by Plants of the World Online. It is endemic to temperate South America.

It resembles moss, but is firm and prickly and tends to grow in mounds. It can be found in Tierra del Fuego and on the Falkland Islands.
