= Jason Islands =

Archipelago in the Falkland Islands

Coordinates: 51.077°S 60.969°W

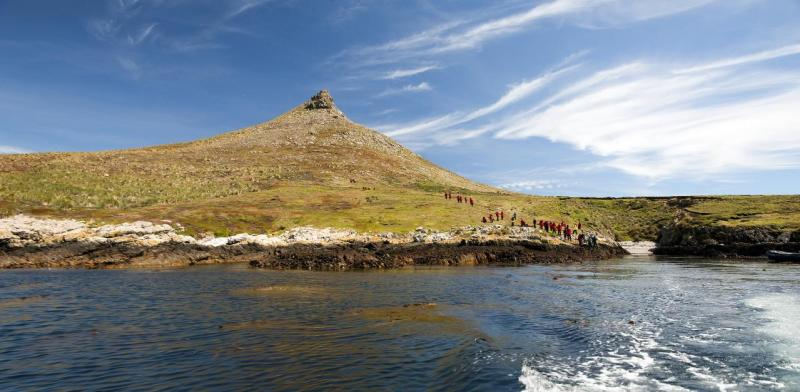
Grand Jason in the Jason Islands, Falkland Islands

Location of the Jason Islands within the Falkland Islands

The Jason Islands (Spanish: Islas Sebaldes) are an archipelago in the Falkland Islands, lying to the far north-west of West Falkland. Three of the islands, Steeple Jason, Grand Jason and Clarke's Islet, are private nature reserves owned by the Wildlife Conservation Society of New York City. Other islands in the group are National Nature Reserves owned by the Falkland Islands Government.

== Geography ==
Topographic map of the Jason Islands

The islands include Steeple Island, Grand Island, Elephant Island, Flat Island and South Island.

- Steeple Jason Island runs south-east to north-west. A narrow neck of land breaks the island into two sections, both with steep slopes on both sides. The northern point has a wide low plateau which is an important area for breeding seabirds.
- Grand Island, the largest of the group, has a varied terrain with steep cliffs and high plateaux with gullies. There are tussac-covered slopes facing west and south, with severely eroded areas, especially at the northern, south-eastern and western ends. At higher levels, tussac is sparse and there are low grasses and small cushion plants.
- Steeple Islet is generally low-lying and slopes towards a rocky north-western point. It is almost completely covered in dense tussac grass.
- Flat Jason Island is low-lying.
- Elephant Jason Island has a long ridge with a maximum height of 208 metres (682 ft). On the western coast there are sheer cliffs; on the northern and eastern coasts, the land slopes into low-lying plateaux covered with dense tussac. The tussac extends around most of the island except at the most northerly point, where there are areas of grass and heath. Early in the 20th century it was used as a base for government sealing inspectors.
- South Jason Island has a central ridge with a high point about 300 metres (980 ft).
- South Fur Island, about 3 miles (4.8 km) off the south coast of South Jason Island, is notable for its dolerite boulders.
- North Fur lies east of Flat Jason. It has steep cliffs and has never been stocked, probably because access is difficult.
- Clarke's Islet is about 0.3 miles (0.48 km) off the north-eastern coast of Grand Jason Island.
- The Fridays are two small, low-lying islands about 3 miles (4.8 km) off the north-west coast of Flat Jason.

The Spanish name for the archipelago is Islas Sebaldes; however, this is sometimes subdivided into "Islas los Salvajes" (western, Grand Jason, and Steeple Jason) and "Islas las Llaves" (eastern, Flat Jason, Seal Rocks and North Fur Island). No such distinction exists in English-language toponymy.

The Jason Islands are somewhat geologically distinct, described by Ian Strange as "sharply rising peaks give them a grandeur found in few other areas of the archipelago".

== History ==
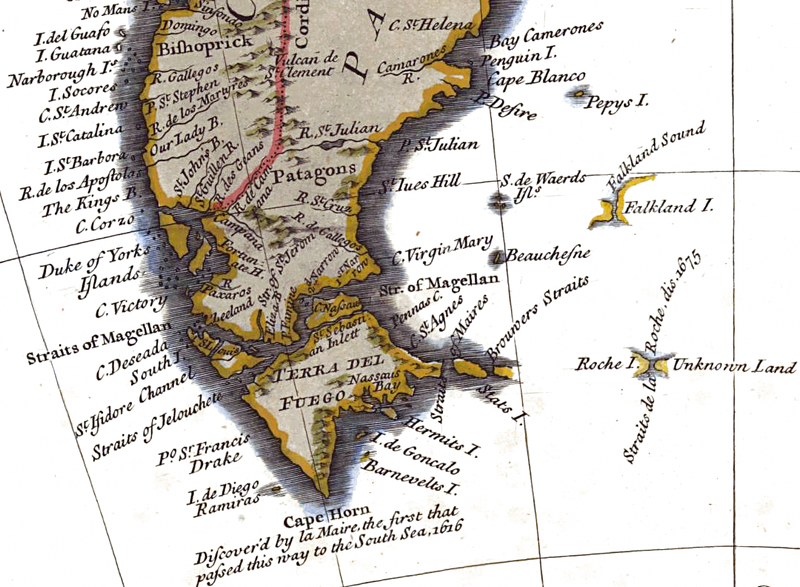
Jason Islands depicted on an 18th-century map, as "S. de Waerds Isl.s" [sic] (R.W. Seale, ca. 1745, fragment)

An archipelago in the region of the Falkland Islands appeared on maps from the early 16th century prompting speculation they may have been sighted by Portuguese or Spanish sailors of the period, although none of the suggestions in the modern literature stand up to scrutiny. In 1592, John Davis is believed to have sighted the Falklands after drifting under bare masts in the Falklands Current its likely that he made an initial sighting of the Jason Islands.

On 24 January 1600 Sebald De Weert, on his homeward leg back to the Netherlands after having left the Straits of Magellan, noticed some islands that did not exist on his nautical charts. He attempted to stop and replenish there, but was unable to land due to harsh conditions. The islands that Sebald de Weert charted were the present day Jason Islands. De Weert named these islands the "Sebald de Weert Eilanden" ("Sebald de Weert Islands" in English), which came to be known to the world as the Sebald Islands. Since 1766, these have been officially known as the "Jason Islands", in the Falklands and throughout the British Empire, although, the name "Sebald Islands" (or Spanish versions "Islas Sebaldinas" or "Sebaldes" for short) remained in use for many years. Today the British name, "Jason Islands", is fairly universal, named after HMS Jason.

Between 1864 and 1866, approximately two million rockhopper and gentoo penguins were killed on the Jasons and boiled to extract their oil.

In March 1970, the islands were bought by Len Hill. The Jason Islands were offered to Hill for £10,000, which included sheep that had been stocked by the previous owner. After some negotiation, he bought the islands for £5,500 without the sheep. Hill once issued some now sought-after Jason Islands banknotes in the name of the islands to raise money for conservation there. The notes were valid until 31 December 1979 and were signed by "Len Hill – Administrator".

In the 1990s, two of the Jason Islands, Steeple Jason Island and Grand Jason Island, were bought by New York philanthropist Michael Steinhardt, who later donated them to the Bronx Zoo based Wildlife Conservation Society along with US$425,000 to build a conservation station named after himself and his wife Judy.

== Population ==
In modern times none of the Jason Islands has been permanently inhabited, but temporary or seasonal inhabitants have lived on them.

In the 1920s a police house was provided, and a resident constable of the Falkland Islands Police maintained a security presence on the islands, chiefly to prevent foreign seal poaching.

Through the nineteenth and twentieth centuries, until the 1980s, several of the islands were also used for grazing sheep, and some cattle. Some buildings remain on the islands from that era, including cottages and sheep shearing sheds.

Some scientific research personnel live temporarily on the islands. In particular, Steinhart Station, constructed in 2003, is an important field research station on Steeple Jason for monitoring wildlife.

== Wildlife ==
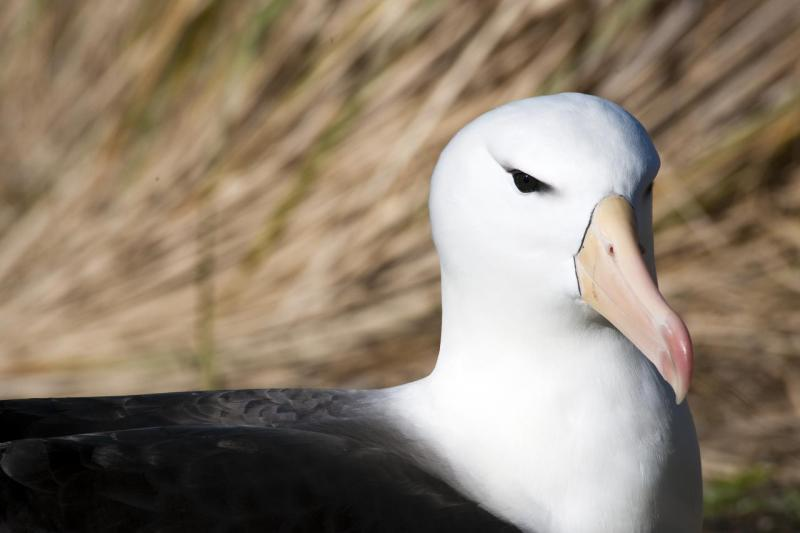
Black-browed albatross (Thalassarche melanophris) in the Jason Islands

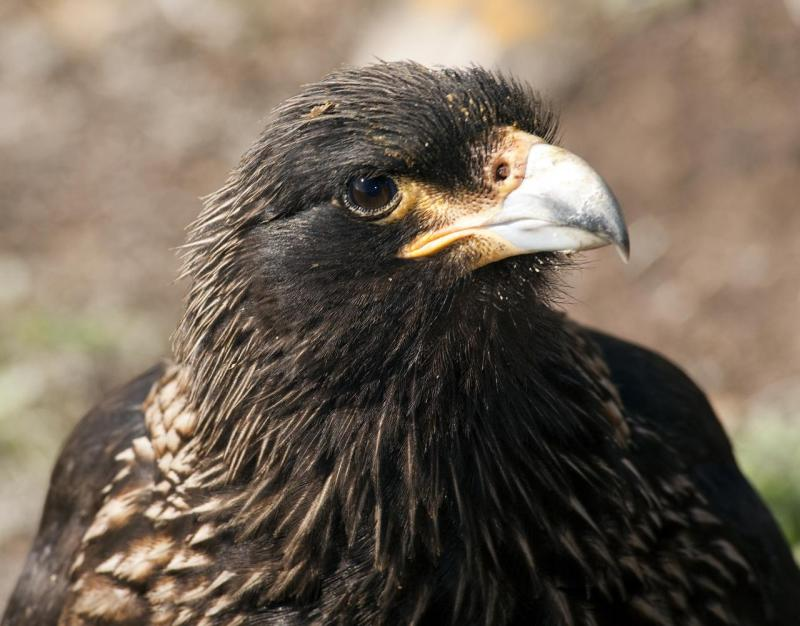
Striated caracara (Daptrius australis) in the Jason Islands

The Jason Islands are home to the striated caracara, albatrosses, Antarctic skuas and fur seals.

=== Important Bird Area ===
The Jason Islands group has been identified by BirdLife International as an Important Bird Area (IBA). Birds for which the site is of conservation significance include Falkland steamer ducks, ruddy-headed geese (10 breeding pairs), gentoo penguins (12,000 pairs) southern rockhopper penguins (140,000 pairs), macaroni penguins (10 pairs), Magellanic penguins, black-browed albatrosses (210,000 pairs), southern giant petrels (1500 pairs), striated caracaras (250 pairs), blackish cinclodes, Cobb's wrens and white-bridled finches.

== Conservation issues ==
"Steeple and Grand Jason were stocked with cattle and up to 5,000 sheep from the late 19th century to about 1968." Overgrazing has left parts of these two islands badly eroded. Elephant Jason was stocked from 1967 to 1971. Since then, the sheep have been removed and the islands have been managed as nature reserves. Fire has been a problem on South Jason. Apart from an infestation of mice on Steeple Jason, the islands in the group are free of introduced predators.

They are now run as a nature reserve.
