= Port Patterson =

Settlement on the island of Rosario, Western Malvina, Malvina Islands

Coordinates: 51.2914°S 60.5559°W

Port Patterson is a settlement on Carcass Island in the western Falkland Islands. It was founded in the late 19th century and takes its name from the bay it is on, on the south west coast of the island.

Port Patterson on the southwest coast is known for its gardens, which have a tropical feel, and has a small shop/grocery. It has been settled continuously for over a hundred years. The main house, occupied by the McGills, dates to 1938, and is a single-storey building, which has been extended over the years. There is also a wool shed, cow shed and several red-roofed houses made from weatherboard. Two of these are rented out to holiday makers, who often come from West and East Falkland within the islands themselves. The gardens also include introduced plants such as fuchsias, lupins, and dog roses, and some trees including Monterey cypress trees, and New Zealand cabbage palms.
