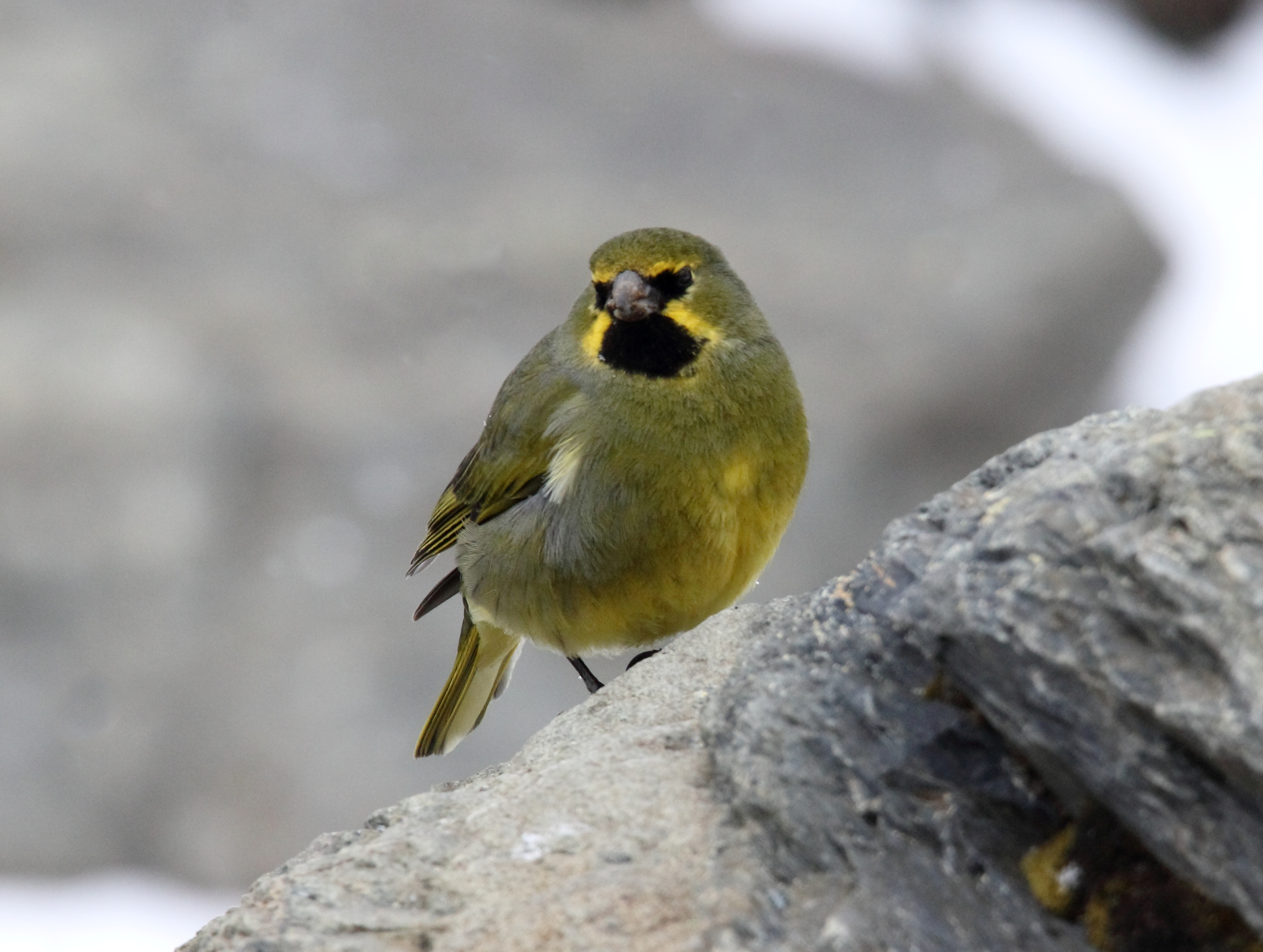

Conservation status
- Least Concern (IUCN 3.1)

Scientific classification
- Kingdom: Animalia
- Phylum: Chordata
- Class: Aves
- Order: Passeriformes
- Family: Thraupidae
- Genus: Melanodera
- Species: M. xanthogramma

Binomial name
- Melanodera xanthogramma (Gould & Gray, 1839)

= Yellow-bridled finch =

Species of bird

The yellow-bridled finch (Melanodera xanthogramma) is a species of bird in the family Thraupidae found in Argentina and Chile.

== Distribution and habitat ==
Its natural habitat is high-altitude grassland, from the tropical in the north to the sub-Antarctic region of Tierra del Fuego and Cape Horn in the south.

== Description ==
The male is mostly yellow and grey with black markings around the face and neck. The female and juvenile are a mottled slightly yellowish grey.

== Diet and behaviour ==
Little is known about their behaviour and feeding habits, as they have only begun to be seriously studied in recent years.
