= Grand Jason Island =

Island of the Falkland Islands

Grand Jason
- Island
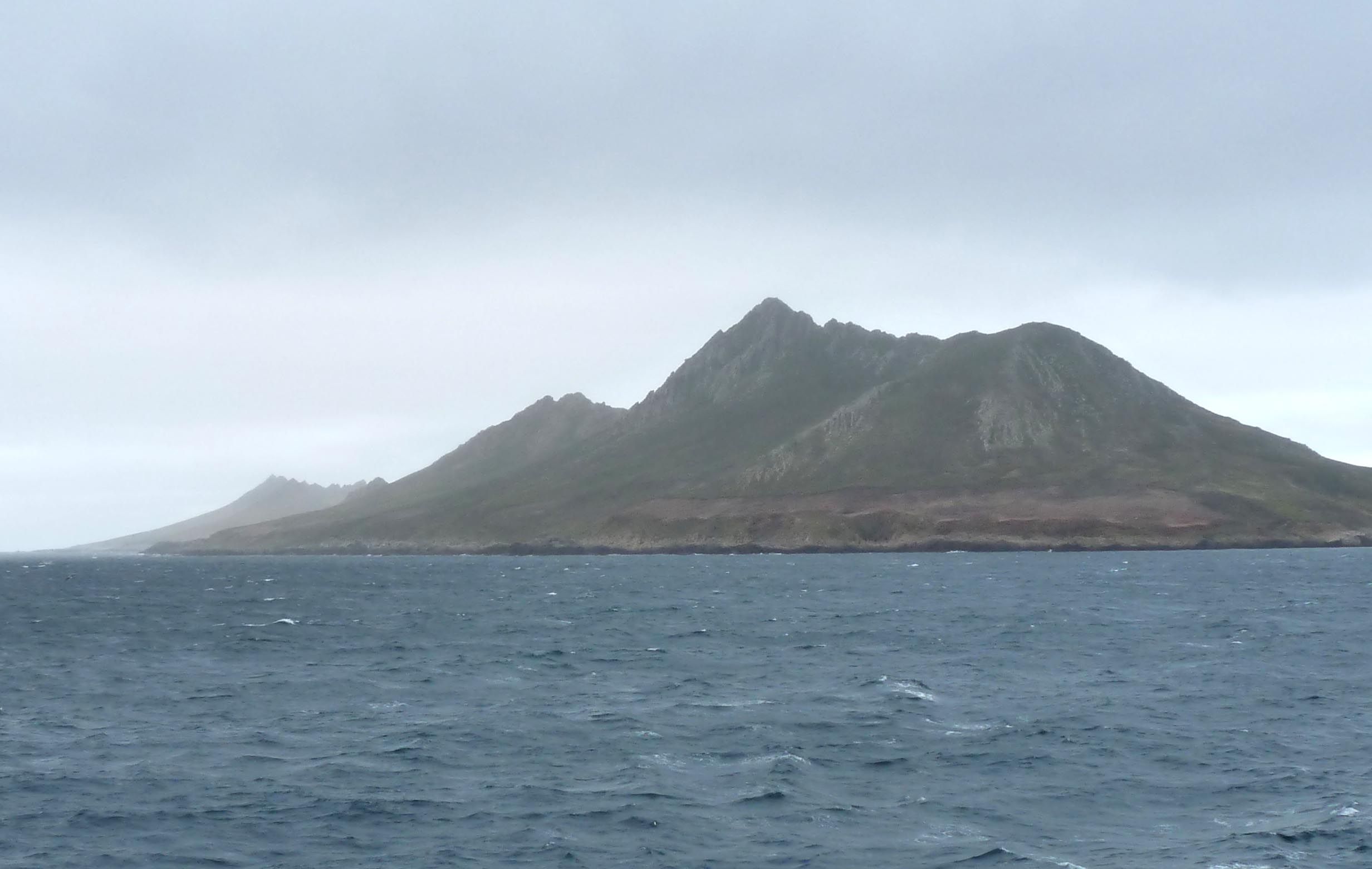

- Grand Jason shown within the Falkland Islands
- Coordinates: 51.06°S 61.10°W
- Country: Falkland Islands
- Island group: Jason Islands

Area
  - Total: 13.8 km^{2} (5.3 sq mi)
- Time zone: UTC−3 (FKST)
- If shown, area and population ranks are for all islands and all inhabited islands in the Falklands respectively.

Grand Jason Island (sometimes known as "Grand Island") is a small island located at 51.05°S 61.05°W, east of the Steeple Jason Island, to the west of the main group of Falkland Islands. The island is a nature reserve and has a large breeding colony of black-browed albatrosses.

== History ==
It is a part of the Jason Islands in the Falkland Islands, and along with Steeple Jason it is one of the "Islas los Salvajes" in Spanish (the Jasons being divided into two groups in that language). The anglicized name of the island group stems from HMS Jason, a frigate of the Royal Navy that arrived at Port Egmont on West Falkland in January 1765. Originally the Jason islands were first recorded by a Dutch navigator, Seebald de Weert, who named them after himself (the Sebald [sic] Islands).

The island is 11 kilometres (6.8 mi) long and 3 kilometres (1.9 mi) across and covers an area of 1,380 hectares (3,400 acres), Grand Jason Island is the largest in the Jason Island group. The island lies 60 kilometres (37 mi) westwards of West Falkland, and its highest point is 358 metres (1,175 ft).

== Wildlife ==
Grand Jason is a home to one of the largest colonies of black-browed albatrosses in the world, with nearby Steeple Jason Island having the largest. Also breeding or inhabitant on the island are Magellanic penguins, rockhopper penguins, Wilson's storm petrel, grey-backed storm petrel, gentoo penguins, striated caracara, and imperial shag. At some point, like elsewhere in the Falkland Islands, sheep and goats were introduced onto Great Jason island; a report from the 1870s stated that several hundred goat skins were bought from the island. There are no goats in the Falkland Islands today. Also in the 19th century, an abundance of penguins led to a penguin oil industry (boiling up penguins for oil) being started on the island.

Grand Jason and Steeple Jason Island, were bought by New York City philanthropist Michael Steinhardt in 1993, who later donated them to the Bronx Zoo based Wildlife Conservation Society in 2001.
