= Safer (surname) =

Safer is a surname. Notable people with the surname include:

- Jeanne Safer (born 1947), American psychotherapist and writer
- John Safer (1922–2018), American sculptor
- Morley Safer (1931–2016), Canadian-American television journalist
- Tolga Safer (born 1982), British actor
