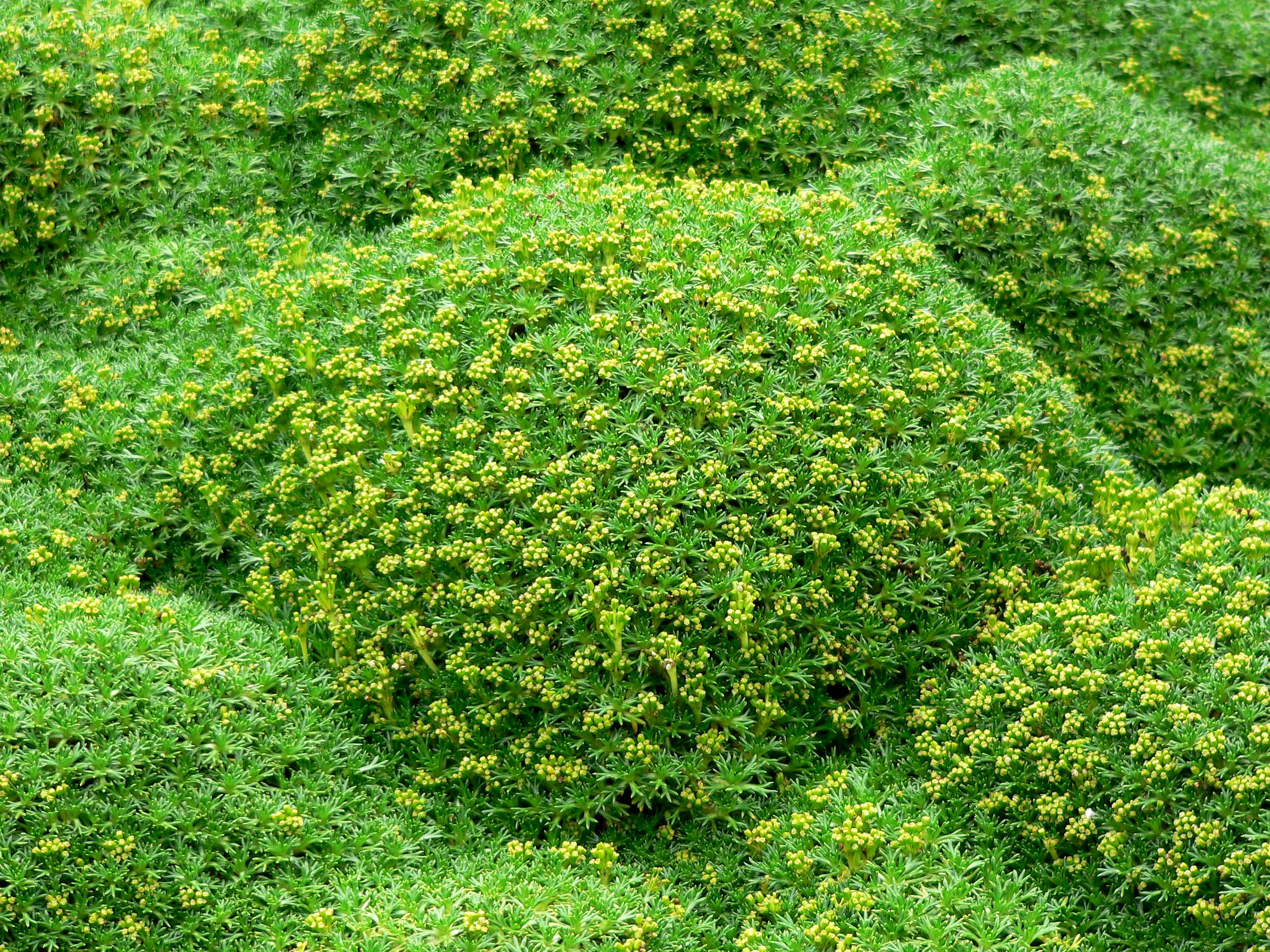

Scientific classification
- Kingdom: Plantae
- Clade: Tracheophytes
- Clade: Angiosperms
- Clade: Eudicots
- Clade: Asterids
- Order: Apiales
- Family: Apiaceae
- Genus: Bolax
- Species: B. gummifera

Binomial name
- Bolax gummifera (Lam.) Spreng.

Synonyms
- Azorella caespitosa Vahl; Azorella columnifer (Gand.) M.Hiroe; Azorella glebaria A.Gray; Bolax columnifera Gand.; Bolax complicata Spreng.; Bolax glebaria Comm. ex Gaudich.; Caucalis gummifera (Lam.) Lag.; Hydrocotyle gummifera Lam.

= Bolax gummifera =

Species of flowering plant

Bolax gummifera is a species of flowering plant in the genus Bolax, found in the Patagonian Andes and the Falkland Islands.
