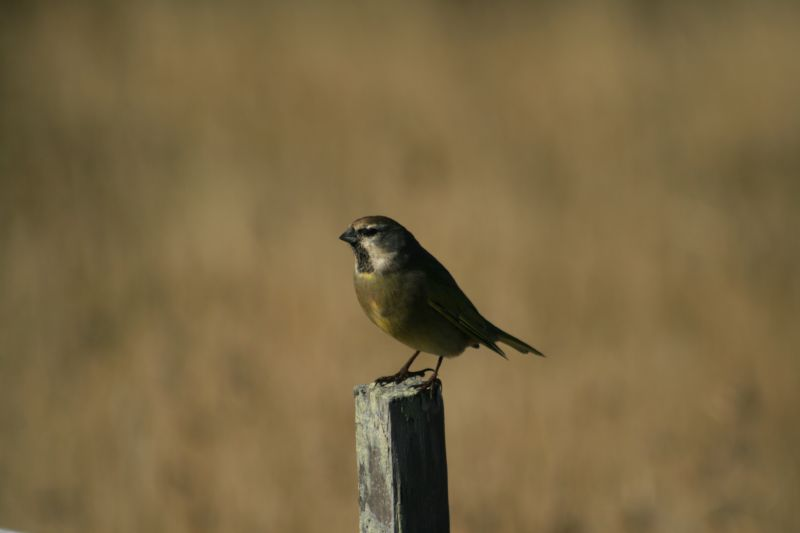

Conservation status
- Least Concern (IUCN 3.1)

Scientific classification
- Kingdom: Animalia
- Phylum: Chordata
- Class: Aves
- Order: Passeriformes
- Family: Thraupidae
- Genus: Melanodera
- Species: M. melanodera

Binomial name
- Melanodera melanodera (Quoy & Gaimard, 1824)

= White-bridled finch =

Species of bird

The white-bridled finch (Melanodera melanodera), also known as the canary-winged finch or black-throated finch, is a small passerine bird belonging to the genus Melanodera together with the yellow-bridled finch (M. xanthogramma). Formerly placed in the family Emberizidae, it is now considered a tanager. It is found in grassland in southernmost South America. There are two subspecies: M. m. melanodera in the Falkland Islands and M. m. princetoniana in southern Argentina and Chile.

== Description ==
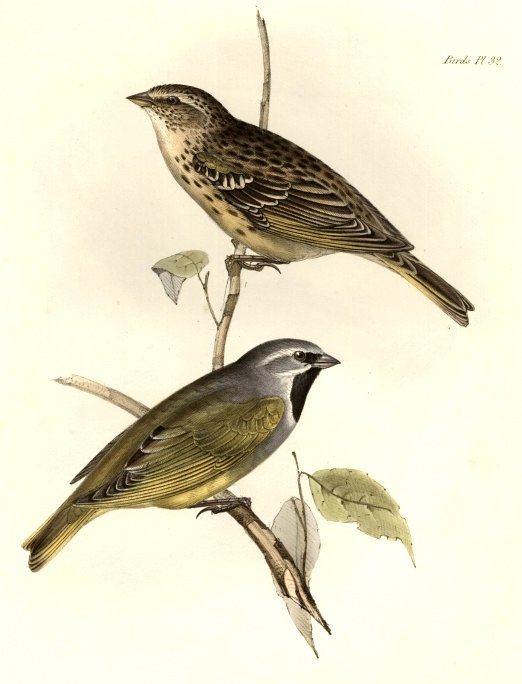

The male is grey-green above and yellow below with a grey head and upper breast. It has a black throat and mask which are bordered with white. There are large yellow patches in the wings and tail. Females are brown with dark streaks. They have yellow outer tail feathers and yellow fringes to the wing feathers.

It is 14–15 cm (5.5–5.9 in) long. Birds on the mainland are smaller than those on the Falklands with a smaller bill and more yellow in the wings and tail.

The call is a short, high-pitched note and the song is a repeated series of two or three whistles. It sings from a low perch such as a rock or grass tussock.

== Distribution and habitat ==
It is common throughout the Falklands where it occurs up to about 150 m (490 ft) above sea level but is most often found in coastal areas. On the South American mainland, it is thinly distributed up to 580 m (1,900 ft) above sea level in Magallanes Region in Chile and Santa Cruz Province in Argentina. Its range extends southwards from about 47°S to northern Tierra del Fuego. It is typically found in flat areas of grassland, heathland, farmland, or dunes.

The population on the Falklands is about 7,000-14,000 pairs and the species is not considered to be threatened. However, it is thought to be declining on the mainland because of overgrazing.

== Behaviour ==
It forages on the ground, feeding mainly on seeds, especially those of grasses.

The nest is built of grass and lined with hair or feathers. It is placed low down in grass or between stones. Three or four eggs are laid and are usually blue-grey or grey-green with purple-brown markings towards the larger end.
