= SubAntarctic Foundation for Ecosystems Research =

New Zealand foundation

The SubAntarctic Foundation for Ecosystems Research (a.k.a. SAFER), founded in 1996 by New Zealand-based zoologist Dr. Peter Carey, is working on several habitat restoration projects on four small islands that SAFER owns in the western Falkland Islands. The islands (Bense, Little Bense, Cliff, and Bradley Islet) are in various states of modification from such human activities as grazing, widespread fire, and introduced species.

SAFER is conducting fauna and flora inventories, studying the ecology of introduced rodents (Norway rat and house mouse) and examining the behaviour and ecology of various resident bird species. In addition, the soil erosion and deposition that resulted from a fire in 1985 is being monitored, with a view to replanting in the future. Eradication of invasive species is also a key part of SAFER's plans to restore the islands to prime wildlife habitat.

These projects are coordinated by SAFER's Director, Peter Carey. SAFER is registered in the United States as a non-profit 501(c)(3) organisation.
