= Blackish cinclodes =

Conservation status
- Near Threatened (IUCN 3.1)

- Near Threatened (IUCN 3.1) (See Taxonomy and Status sections)

Scientific classification
- Kingdom: Animalia
- Phylum: Chordata
- Class: Aves
- Order: Passeriformes
- Family: Furnariidae
- Genus: Cinclodes
- Species: C. antarcticus

Binomial name
- Cinclodes antarcticus (Garnot, 1826)
- Range of C. a. antarcticus

Species of bird

The blackish cinclodes (Cinclodes antarcticus) is a Near Threatened passerine bird in the Furnariinae subfamily of the ovenbird family Furnariidae. It is found on Tierra del Fuego and the Falkland Islands, where it is known as the tussac-bird or tussock-bird.

== Taxonomy and systematics ==
The blackish cinclodes' taxonomy is unsettled. The International Ornithological Committee and the Clements taxonomy assign it two subspecies, the nominate C. a. antarcticus (Garnot, 1826) and C. a. maculirostris (Dabbene, 1917. BirdLife International's Handbook of the Birds of the World (HBW) treats the two taxa as separate species, retaining "blackish cinclodes" for antarcticus and calling maculirostris the "black cinclodes".

This article follows the one-species, two-subspecies, model.

== Description ==
The blackish cinclodes is 18 to 23 cm (7.1 to 9.1 in) long and weighs about 63 g (2.2 oz). The sexes have the same plumage. Adults of the nominate subspecies are mostly dark sooty brown, with a slightly paler throat and some dull rufous on the base of the flight feathers. The last is usually visible only in flight. Its iris is dark brown, its bill blackish, and its legs and feet blackish. Juveniles are generally browner than adults. Subspecies C. a. maculirostris is slightly larger than the nominate with a shorter bill and longer tail, and is blacker overall with a visibly yellowish base to its bill and no rufous on its wings.

== Distribution and habitat ==
The nominate subspecies of the blackish cinclodes is found on the Falkland Islands. Surveys through the late 1990s found them on 40 of the 59 islands studied. Subspecies C. a. maculirostris is found in southernmost mainland Chile, both Chilean and Argentine Tierra del Fuego, and other islands in the Cape Horn Archipelago.

The blackish cinclodes is primarily coastal though it does range as far inland as 0.5 km (0.3 mi). It favors landscapes of short grass and tussoc (tussock) grass Poa flabellata, and is also common around human habitations. Both subspecies are often found on rocky beaches near colonies of marine mammals and seabirds. In elevation they range from sea level to about 200 m (700 ft).

== Behavior ==
=== General ===
The blackish cinclodes is often very tame and will approach humans and their habitations, especially in the Falklands.

=== Movement ===
The blackish cinclodes is a year-round resident throughout its range.

=== Feeding ===
The blackish cinclodes feeds mainly on small invertebrates such as amphipods, isopods, flies, and Orthoptera. Among seabird colonies it feeds on cracked eggs, scraps, and regurgitated matter, and also takes prey from excrement. It has also been documented feeding at wounds on southern elephant seals (Mirounga leonina) and sometimes enters houses to take food crumbs and scraps. On and near beaches it gleans and probes for prey, especially in floating and washed up kelp. It leaps up to capture flies in mid-air and follows humans along beaches to capture what they disturb.

=== Breeding ===
Most of the data on the blackish cinclodes' breeding biology comes from the nominate subspecies on the Falklands. Their breeding season lasts from September to January and two broods are often raised. Subspecies C. a. maculirostris appears to have a similar nesting season. Both subspecies nest in a tunnel in an earthen bank or in a rock crevice. The nominate is also known to nest in abandoned seabird burrows and under buildings. Both subspecies line the nest chamber with grass and feathers. The clutch size is two or three eggs. In the Falklands the incubation period is about 16 days, fledging occurs about 25 days after hatch, and both adults care for the young.

=== Vocalization ===
All of the recordings of blackish cinclodes vocalizations in xeno-canto and the Cornell Lab of Ornithology's Macaulay Library are from the Falkland Islands. The song is "a long series of sharp, explosive notes intermixed with musical trills...described as tittering chee-chee-chee-chee-cheecheecheecheecheechee-chee". The species sometimes sings during a flight display that ends with a dive to the ground, and occasionally sings for several minutes on the ground. Its call is "a short, sharp chip" that is sometimes extended into a trill.

== Status ==
The IUCN follows HBW taxonomy and so has separately assessed the two subspecies of blackish cinclodes. Both are considered Near Threatened. The size of the nominate "blackish" population on the Falkland Islands is not known and is believed to be decreasing. The population of the "black" C. a. maculirostris is estimated at 3000 to 19,000 mature individuals and is also believed to be decreasing. Both are extremely vulnerable to predation by introduced cats and rats and are generally found only where they are absent. Some previously affected small islands in the Falklands have been cleared of land predators and populations on them appear to be more stable. The species occurs in only a few formally protected areas.
