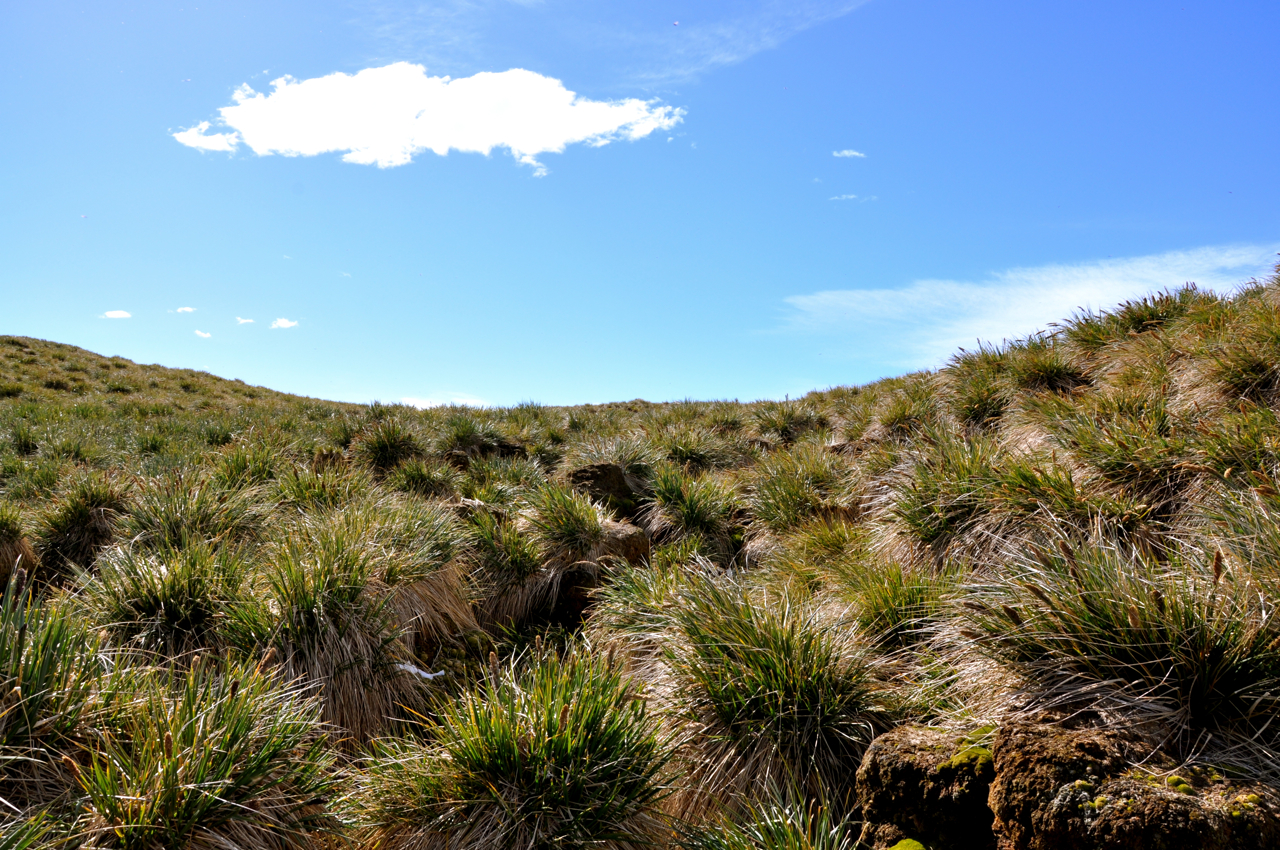

Scientific classification
- Kingdom: Plantae
- Clade: Embryophytes
- Clade: Tracheophytes
- Clade: Spermatophytes
- Clade: Angiosperms
- Clade: Monocots
- Clade: Commelinids
- Order: Poales
- Family: Poaceae
- Subfamily: Pooideae
- Genus: Poa
- Species: P. flabellata

Binomial name
- Poa flabellata (Lam.) Hook.f.

Synonyms
- Dactylis caespitosa J.R.Forst.; Festuca antarctica Spreng.; Festuca caespitosa (J.R.Forst.) Roem.)& Schult.; Festuca flabellata Lam.; Festuca urvilleana Steud.; Parodiochloa flabellata (Lam.) C.E.Hubb.; Poa caespitosa (J.R.Forst.) Speg.; Poa controversa Steud.; Poa controversa var. minor Steud.; Poa forsteri Steud.; Sesleria americana Nees ex Steud.

= Poa flabellata =

Species of grass

Poa flabellata, commonly known as tussac grass or just tussac, is a tussock grass native to Patagonia, the Falkland Islands, South Georgia and other islands in the South Atlantic. There are also two isolated records from the herbarium at the French Muséum national d'histoire naturelle for the Île Amsterdam in the Indian Ocean.

It was introduced to Shetland, Scotland for basket making in 1844, and possibly as a source of fodder because of its ability to grow in hostile conditions..

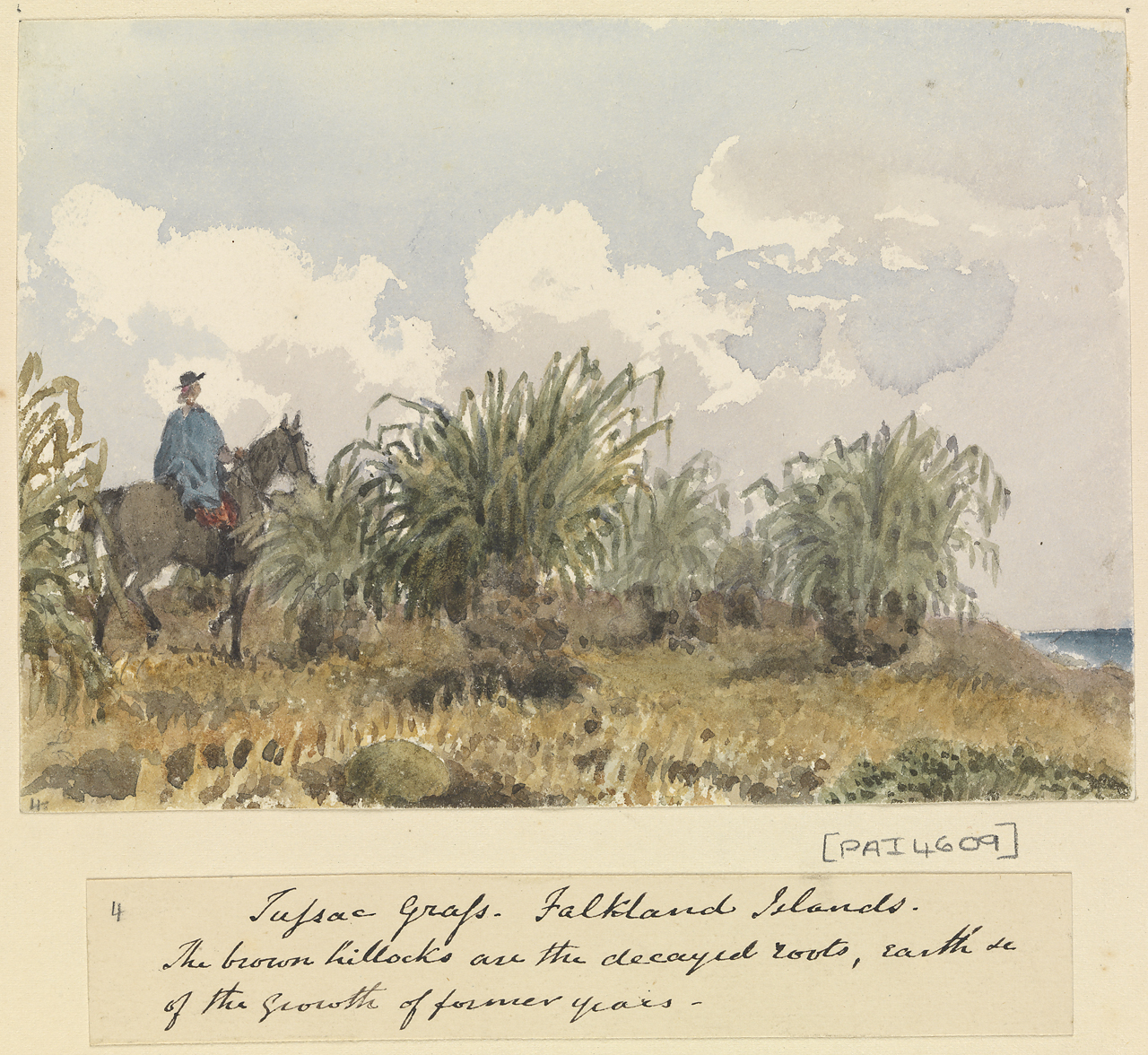
Edward Gennys Fanshawe, tussac grass, Falkland Islands

It grows in dense clumps, usually about 2 metres (6 ft 7 in) high (although they can be much taller), on wet coastal land and is a dominant feature of much of the landscape.

== Associated organisms ==
The plant community dominated by P. flabellata is widely used by birds and mammals.

Breeding colonies of southern fur seal, elephant seal, Magellanic penguin, macaroni penguin, and albatrosses are all found amongst tussac grass on South Georgia and elsewhere. The austral thrush is predominantly found in this habitat on the Falkland Islands, with tussocks being used as nesting sites. The South Georgia pipit also uses the tussocks for nesting.

On South Georgia, it was a principal food of the introduced reindeer (which was eradicated in 2015) which had caused considerable environmental damage, including erosion and eventual replacement of tussac grass in places by the introduced annual meadow-grass.

== Bibliography ==
- Collar, N. J. (2005), "Family Turdidae (Thrushes)", in del Hoyo. J.; Elliott, A.; Sargatal, J. (eds.), Cuckoo-shrikes to Thrushes, Handbook of the Birds of the World, vol. 10, pp. 514–811, ISBN 84-87334-72-5
- Edmondson, J. R. (1980). "Poa". In T. G. Tutin; V. H. Heywood; N. A. Burges; D. H. Valentine; S. M. Walters; D. A. Webb (eds.). Alismataceae to Orchidaceae. Flora Europea. Vol. 5. Cambridge: Cambridge University Press. pp. 1159–1167.
- Greene, Stanley W. (1964). The vascular flora of South Georgia. British Antarctic Survey.
- Hubbard, C. Grasses (1st ed.). Penguin.
- Marticorena, C. & M. Quezada (1985). Catálogo de la Flora Vascular de Chile. Gayana, Bot. 42: 1–157.
- Moore, D. M. (1983). Flora of Tierra del Fuego. Oswestry; St. Louis: A. Nelson; Missouri Botanical Garden. p. 396.
- Moore, D. M. (1968). The vascular flora of the Falkland Islands. British Antarctic Survey Scientific Reports. 60: 1–202, 1–6 pls.
- Nicora, E. G., M. E. D. Paula, A. M. Faggi, M. d. Mariano, A. M. M. A., L. R. Parodi, C. A. Petetin, F. A. Roig & Z. R. Agrasar (1978). Gramineae. 8(3): 1–583. In M. N. Correa Fl. Patagónica. Instituto Nacional de Tecnología Agropecuaria, Buenos Aires.
- Scott, W. & Palmer R. (1987). The Flowering Plants and Ferns of the Shetland Islands. Shetland Times, Lerwick.
- Sell, Peter; Murrell, Gina (1996). Flora of Great Britain and Ireland: Volume 5, Butomaceae - Orchidaceae. Cambridge University Press. pp. 165–166. ISBN 978-0-521-55339-1.
- Soreng, R. J., G. Davidse, P. M. Peterson, F. O. Zuloaga, E. J. Judziewicz, T. S. Filgueiras & O. Morrone (2003- ). On-line taxonomic novelties and updates, distributional additions and corrections, and editorial changes since the four published volumes of the Catalogue of New World Grasses (Poaceae) published in Contr. U.S. Natl. Herb. vols. 39, 41, 46, and 48. http://www.tropicos.org/Project/CNWG:. In R. J. Soreng, G. Davidse, P. M. Peterson, F. O. Zuloaga, T. S. Filgueiras, E. J. Judziewicz & O. Morrone Internet Catalogue. New World Grasses. Missouri Botanical Garden, St. Louis.
- Soreng, R. J., L. M. Giussani & M. A. Negritto (2003). "Poa". In Catalogue of New World Grasses (Poaceae): IV. Subfamily Pooideae. Contr. U.S. Natl. Herb. 48: 505–580.
- Stace, C.A. (2010). New Flora of the British Isles (3rd ed.). Cambridge: Cambridge University Press. pp. 1232. ISBN 978-0-521-70772-5.
- Stace, Clive A.; Crawley, Michael J. (2015). Alien Plants. New Naturalists. Vol. 129. London: Collins. p. 626. ISBN 978-0-00-750215-8.
- Wace, Nigel Morritt; Holdgate, Martin W. (1976). Man and Nature in the Tristan Da Cunha Islands. International Union for Conservation of Nature and Natural Resources.
- Zuloaga, F. O., E. G. Nicora, Z. E. R. Agrasar, O. Morrone, J. Pensiero & A. M. Cialdella (1994). Catálogo de la familia Poaceae en la República Argentina. Monographs in Systematic Botany from the Missouri Botanical Garden. 47: i–xi, 1–178.
- Zuloaga, F. O., O. Morrone, M. J. Belgrano, C. Marticorena & E. Marchesi (eds.) (2008). Catálogo de las Plantas Vasculares del Cono Sur (Argentina, Sur de Brasil, Chile, Paraguay y Uruguay). Monographs in Systematic Botany from the Missouri Botanical Garden. 107(1): i–xcvi, 1–983; 107(2): i–xx, 985–2286; 107(3): i–xxi, 2287–3348.
