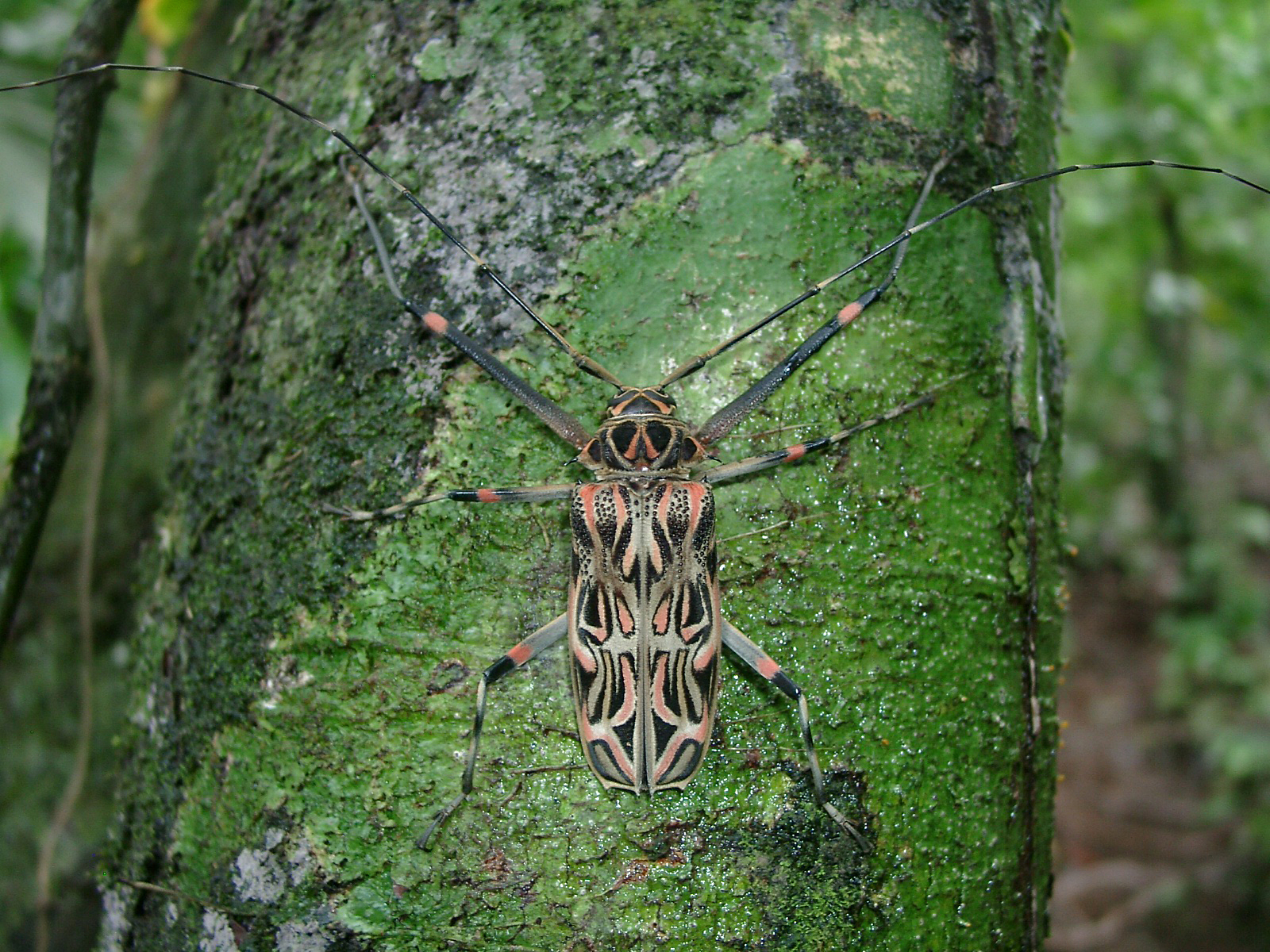
- A harlequin beetle in its natural habitat

Scientific classification
- Kingdom: Animalia
- Phylum: Arthropoda
- Clade: Pancrustacea
- Class: Insecta
- Order: Coleoptera
- Suborder: Polyphaga
- Infraorder: Cucujiformia
- Family: Cerambycidae
- Genus: Acrocinus; Illiger, 1806
- Species: A. longimanus

Binomial name
- Acrocinus longimanus (Linnaeus, 1758)

Synonyms
- Cerambyx longimanus

= Harlequin beetle =

Species of beetle

The harlequin beetle (Acrocinus longimanus) is a large and distinctly colored species of longhorn beetle from the Neotropics and the only member of the genus Acrocinus.

It is given its English name because of the elaborate pattern of black, orange-red and greenish-yellow markings in both sexes; despite this the beetle is quite well-camouflaged when perched on a lichen or fungus covered tree trunk. The species name longimanus is a Latin word that refers to the extremely long forelegs (manus) of the large males, which are longer than the beetle's entire body. The head-and-body of this beetle measures 4.3 to 7.5 cm (1.7–3.0 in) long. The size and unusual appearance of the harlequin beetle has made it popular among insect collectors. Although essentially harmless to humans, it may bite in self-defense with its strong mandibles.

== Taxonomy ==
The harlequin beetle was first scientifically described as Cerambyx longimanus by Linnaeus in the 10th edition of Systema Naturae in 1758. In 1806, it was moved to the newly coined genus Acrocinus by Illiger. Although recent authorities have consistently recognized it as the only member of this genus, the relationship to other genera of longhorned beetles has not been clear: It has been disputed whether the tribe Acrocinini only should include the genus Acrocinus or it also include a few other genera. Recent authorities have often considered Acrocinini as monotypic, but an analysis of morphological characters indicates that Macropophora and Oreodera are sufficiently close to also be included in this tribe.

Despite the very large distribution of the harlequin beetle, both morphological and genetic evidence supports its status as a single widespread species rather than a cryptic species complex.

== Distribution and habitat ==
The harlequin beetle is found in tropical and subtropical parts of the Americas, ranging from Mexico, through Central and South America, south as far as northernmost Argentina (Corrientes and Misiones), southernmost Brazil (Rio Grande do Sul) and Paraguay. It also occurs on the Caribbean island nation of Trinidad and Tobago, but a record from Barbados is considered erroneous. The harlequin beetle has been recorded from all Central American countries and all South American countries, except Chile and Uruguay. In Mexico, its distribution is incompletely known, but it is found in the south of the country, ranging north along the western side of the central plateau to Sinaloa and along the eastern side to San Luis Potosí.

The harlequin beetle is locally common and while most records are from undisturbed forests, it also occurs in secondary forest and occasionally even in cities if there are green areas nearby. Most of its South American range is in the Amazon and Atlantic forests, but it also occurs more locally in the Cerrado and Caatinga, and in the northwestern part of the continent it occurs in both humid and fairly dry lowland and highland forests on both sides of the Andes, in interandean valles and the coastal Caribbean region. It has been recorded at elevations up to 2,150 m (7,050 ft) above sea level.

== Ecology ==
=== Sexual dimorphism and behavior ===
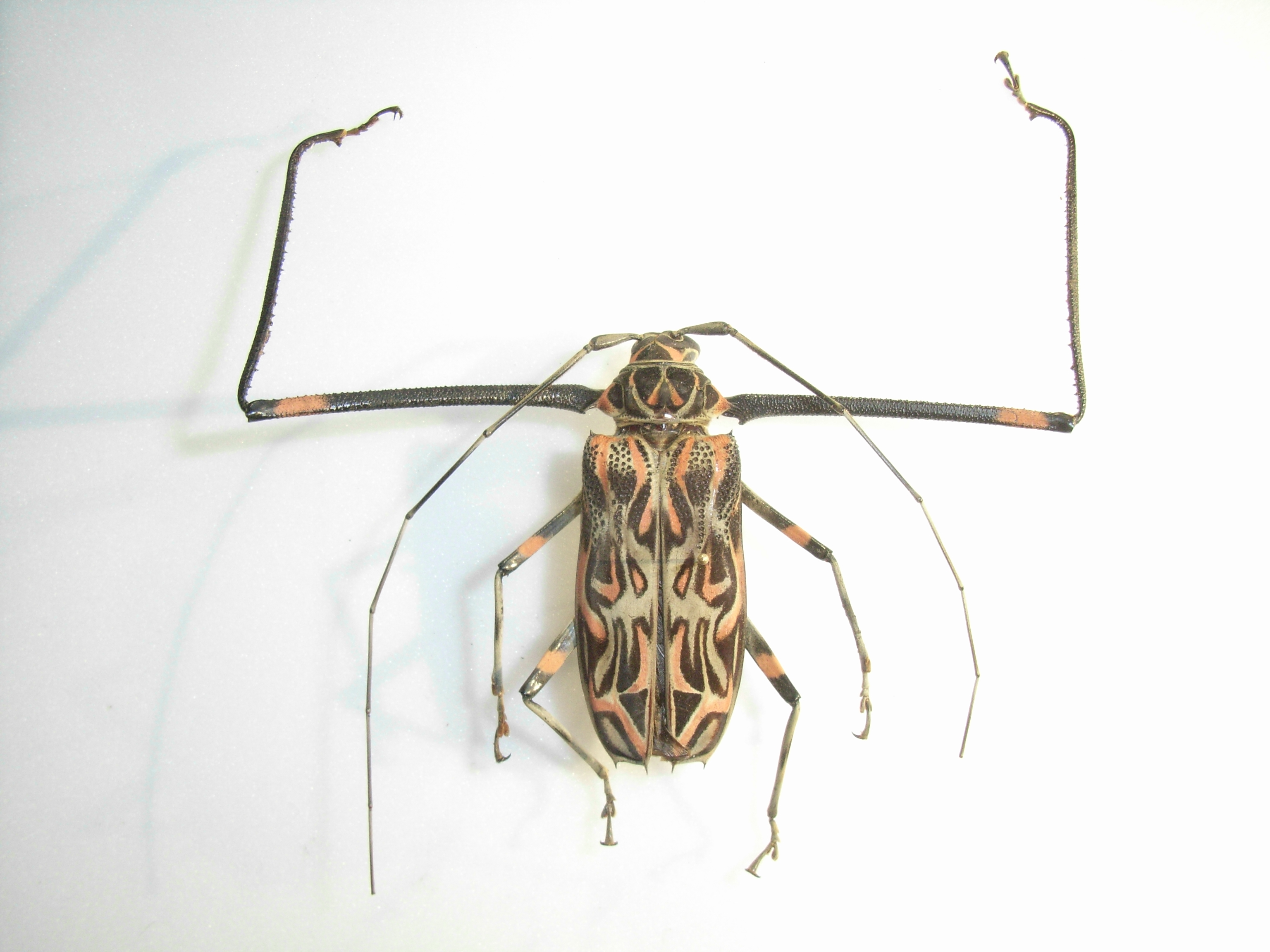
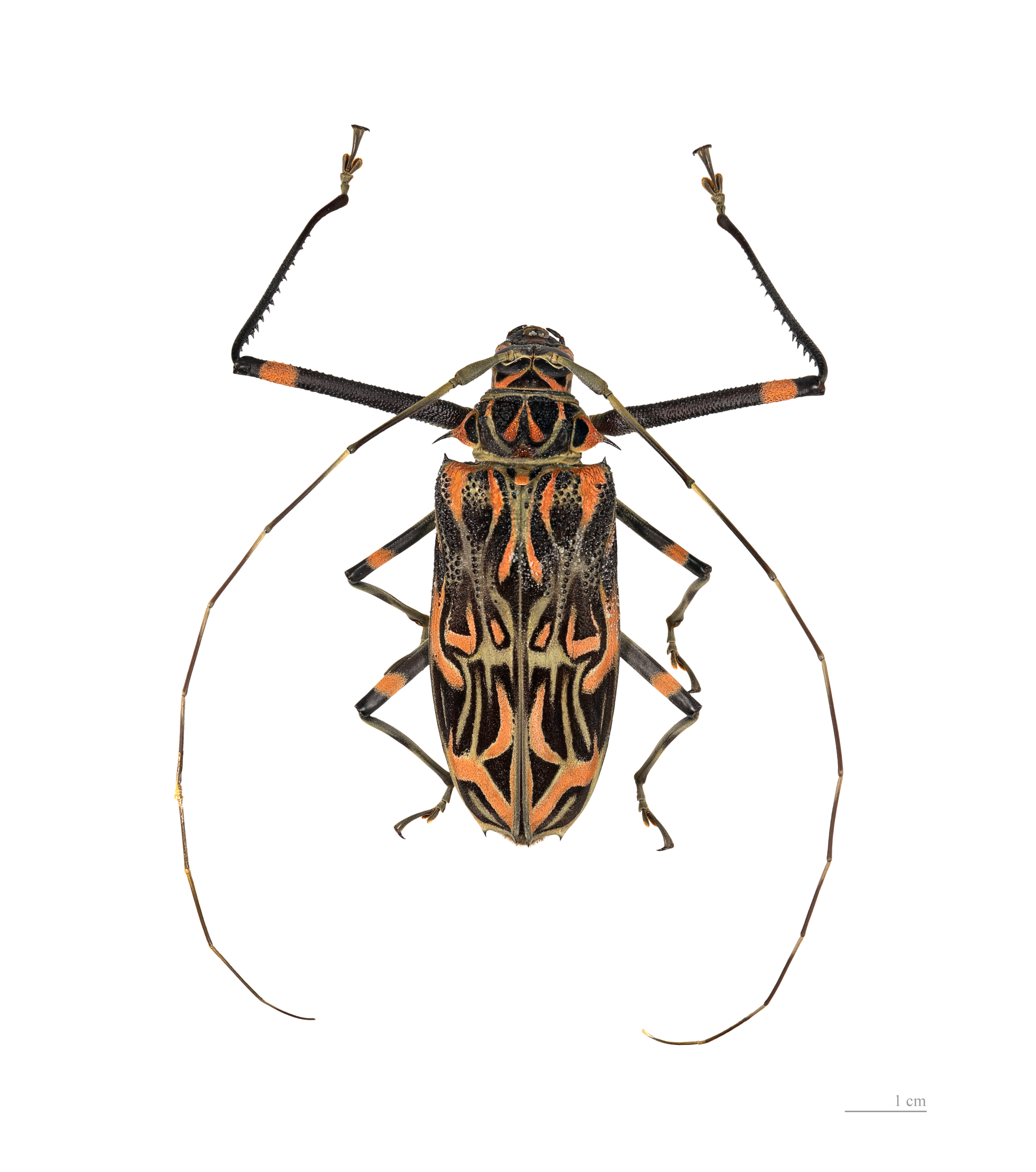
Male (left) and female (right)

Male and female harlequin beetles have similar color patterns and reach a similar body size, but the species is sexually dimorphic in the foreleg length and shape: In large males, the forelegs are greatly extended, up to 15 cm (6 in) long, being twice the length as in females with the same body size. Large males also exhibit strong curvature in their foreleg tibiae, which is not seen in females. However, in small males, both length and shape of the forelegs resemble that seen in small females. These traits aid the males as they fight with each other over optimal egg deposition sites in preparation for mating. Males engage each other with their forelimbs in an attempt to flip other males off of the dead or dying trees that may be chosen by females to provide food for developing larvae. The males also readily attempt to bite each other with their strong mandibles, sometimes biting off pieces of the opponents antennae or legs. Once a site has been secured, the male will guard it around the clock, but females typically only are present during nighttime; once a female arrives, the male will also guard her.

=== Reproduction and life history ===
Harlequin beetles mainly fly during the night and appear to be able to rapidly locate recently fallen trees through the smell of the large amounts of sap that is released when it happens. They are also attracted to artificial light during the night. The females prefer to lay their eggs on recently fallen trees, but may also use trees that have fallen up to a few months ago but not yet decayed, dead sections of living trees, or weakened living trees. When using trees that are still alive, they are occasionally regarded as a pest, but otherwise harlequin beetles play an important role in the early phase of decomposition of dead wood, also creating habitats for other saproxylic species. Mating and egg-laying mostly happens at dusk or dawn, and a wide range of tree species are used, including Artocarpus, Bagassa guianensis, Brosimum alicastrum (breadnut) and others in the genus Brosimum, Caryocar (souari trees), Castilla elastica (Panama rubber tree), Ceiba, Clarisia, Couma, Enterolobium, Eucalyptus (not native to the Americas but widely introduced), Ficus (fig trees), Guazuma, Inga, Lonchocarpus, Maclura, Parahancornia, Perebea, Persea and Theobroma cacao (cocoa tree). The female uses her strong mandibles to make several circular, elliptical or crescent-shaped holes (diameter or maximum length 1.5–4 cm [0.6–1.6 in]) in the bark; the holes are typically placed at regular intervals and as if on a string, forming a distinct pattern on the tree. The female places a single egg in each hole and she will typically lay 15–20 eggs over a period of several hours or a few days; a female may lay up to a total of 160 eggs. After an egg hatches, the wood is used as a food source by the larvae, which makes a network of tunnels inside it. Just before pupating, the larvae can be around 13 cm (5 in) long.

The time elapsed from the egg being laid to emergence from the wood as an adult beetle ranges between 4 to 12 months, or possibly even up to two years. Although the harlequin beetle is very rarely maintained in captivity, it has been successfully raised and bred for several generations using either freshly cut wood from Morus (mulberry), or an artificially composite of Morus sawdust, a commercial mixture used for insect rearing and morin suspended in agar, as a larval food source.

The adult beetles can live up to about half a year, and they will feed on sap, wood, fungi and occasionally animal droppings. There is a level of seasonality in the species; adult beetles can be seen year-round, but they are most abundant in the first few months of the rainy season.

=== Relationship with pseudoscorpions ===
Tiny pseudoscorpions may attach themselves or hide under the wing coverts of harlequin beetles to use them for transport, which is a form of phoresy. In one case, fifteen pseudoscorpion had hidden themselves under the wing coverts of a harlequin beetle, but their combined weight was still less than 2.5% of the beetle's. Some pseudoscorpion species appear to primarily, or exclusively, rely on harlequin beetles for dispersal between their habitats. Once transported to a recently fallen tree by harlequin beetles, a new pseudoscorpion colony is formed and remains isolated until the next generation of harlequin beetles have completed their immature stages (egg, larvae and pupae) in the wood and emerge as adult beetles. At that point, pseudoscorpions from the colony will attach themselves to the emerging beetles to be transported to a new recently fallen tree, starting the cycle over again.

=== Anti-fungal properties ===
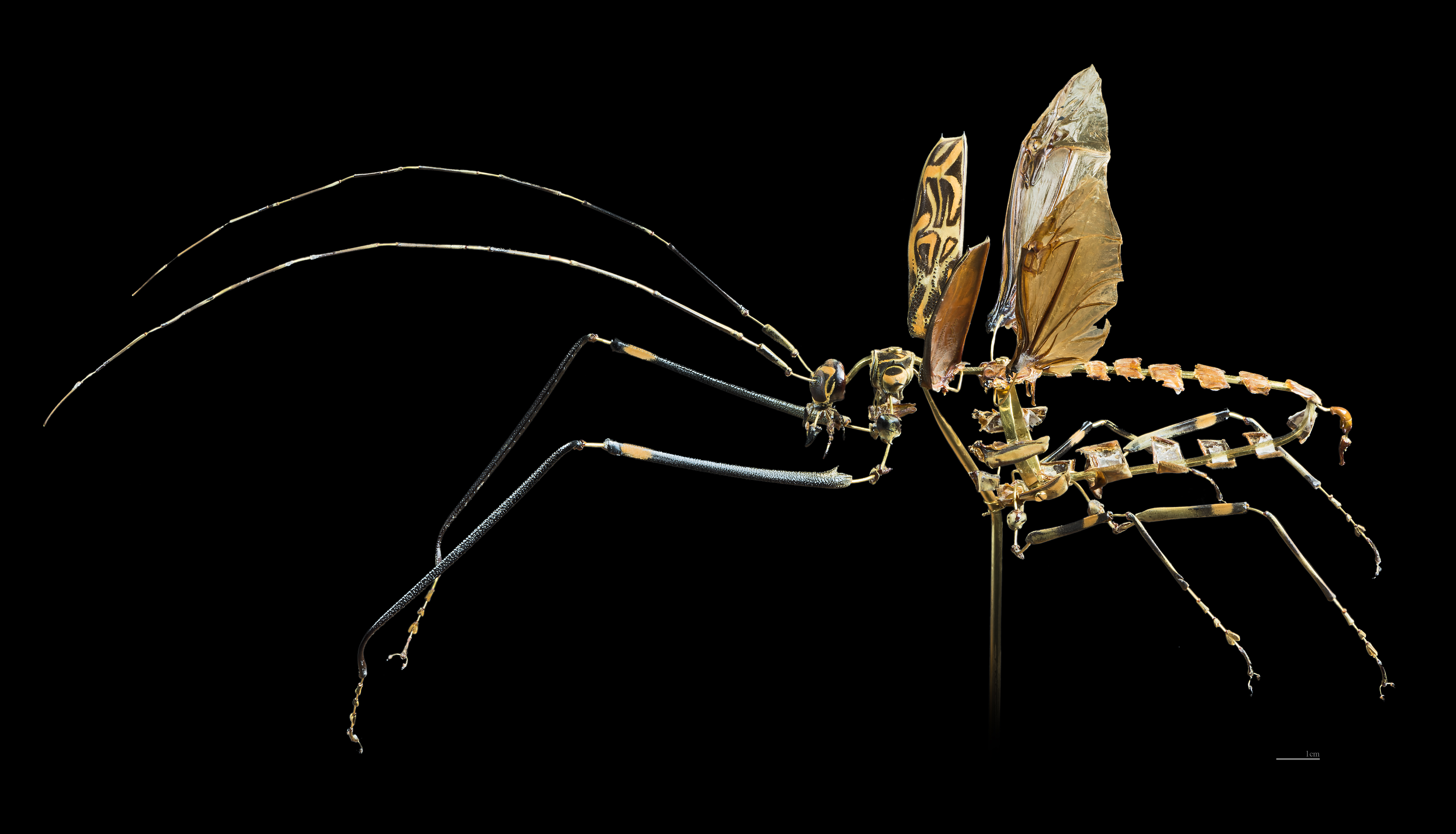
Male - Beauchêne technique

The harlequin beetle contains three homologous peptides, Alo-1, Alo-2, and Alo-3. Alo-3 was the first known peptide from insects to exhibit the knottin fold. It has a higher level of activity against the fungal species Candida glabrata than the Alo-1 and Alo-2 peptides do. Currently, there is a lack of treatment for fatal hospital-acquired infections and other pathologies. The peptide Alo-3 found in Harlequin beetles could provide a treatment for these severe, life threatening infections.
