= Beauchene =

Beauchene may refer to:

- Jacques Gouin de Beauchene, French explorer
- Beauchene Island, Falklands named after him
- Edmé François Chauvot de Beauchêne (1780-1830) French anatomist.
