= Earpod =

Earpod or ear pod or variant may refer to:

- EarPods – headphones produced by Apple Inc. since 2012
- Acacia auriculiformis, the earpod or earpod wattle – a tree from Australasia
- Enterolobium contortisiliquum, the earpod or Pacara earpod – a tree
- Enterolobium cyclocarpum, the earpod – a tree
