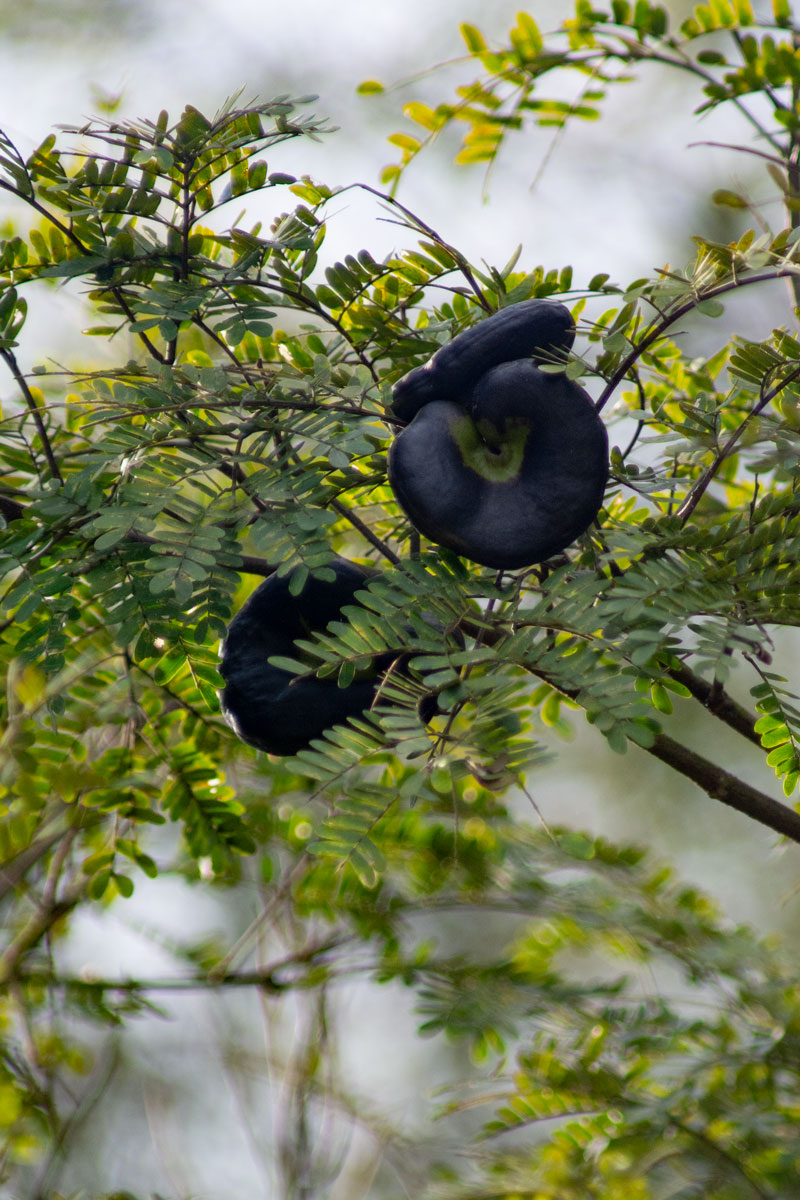
- Enterolobium barinense, nearly ripe pod of a wild tree in Villavicencio, Colombia

Scientific classification
- Kingdom: Plantae
- Clade: Tracheophytes
- Clade: Angiosperms
- Clade: Eudicots
- Clade: Rosids
- Order: Fabales
- Family: Fabaceae
- Subfamily: Caesalpinioideae
- Clade: Mimosoid clade
- Genus: Enterolobium
- Species: E. barinense

Binomial name
- Enterolobium barinense L.Cárdenas & H.Rodr.-Carr.

= Enterolobium barinense =

Species of tree

Enterolobium barinense, commonly known as caro blanco or oreja de negro, is a species of flowering tree in the pea family, Fabaceae. It was previously thought to be endemic to Venezuela, but it has been located in neighboring Colombia as well. It differs from the very similar and sympatric E. cyclocarpum by its black (instead of reddish-brown) and smoother pods, and by its larger, fewer and more rounded leaflets.
