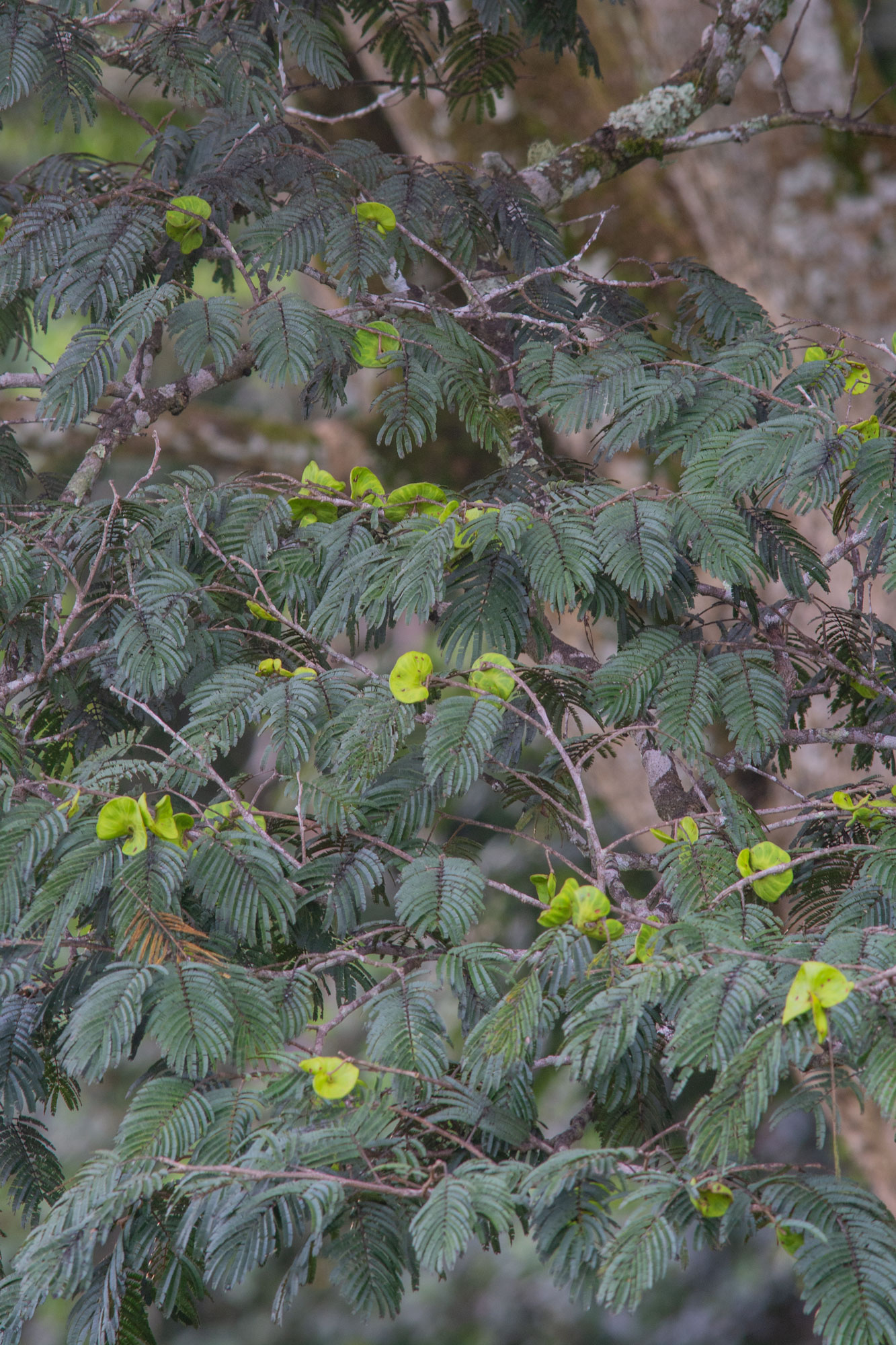
- Enterolobium schomburgkii, unripe pods and foliage of a wild tree in Puerto López, Meta), Colombia

Conservation status
- Least Concern (IUCN 3.1)

Scientific classification
- Kingdom: Plantae
- Clade: Tracheophytes
- Clade: Angiosperms
- Clade: Eudicots
- Clade: Rosids
- Order: Fabales
- Family: Fabaceae
- Subfamily: Caesalpinioideae
- Clade: Mimosoid clade
- Genus: Robrichia
- Species: R. schomburgkii

Binomial name
- Robrichia schomburgkii (Benth.) A.R.M.Luz & E.R.Souza (2022)

Synonyms
- Enterolobium schomburgkii (Benth.) Benth. (1875); Feuilleea schomburgkii (Benth.) Kuntze (1891); Mimosa wilsonii Standl. (1933); Pithecellobium schomburgkii Benth. (1844)

= Robrichia schomburgkii =

Species of legume

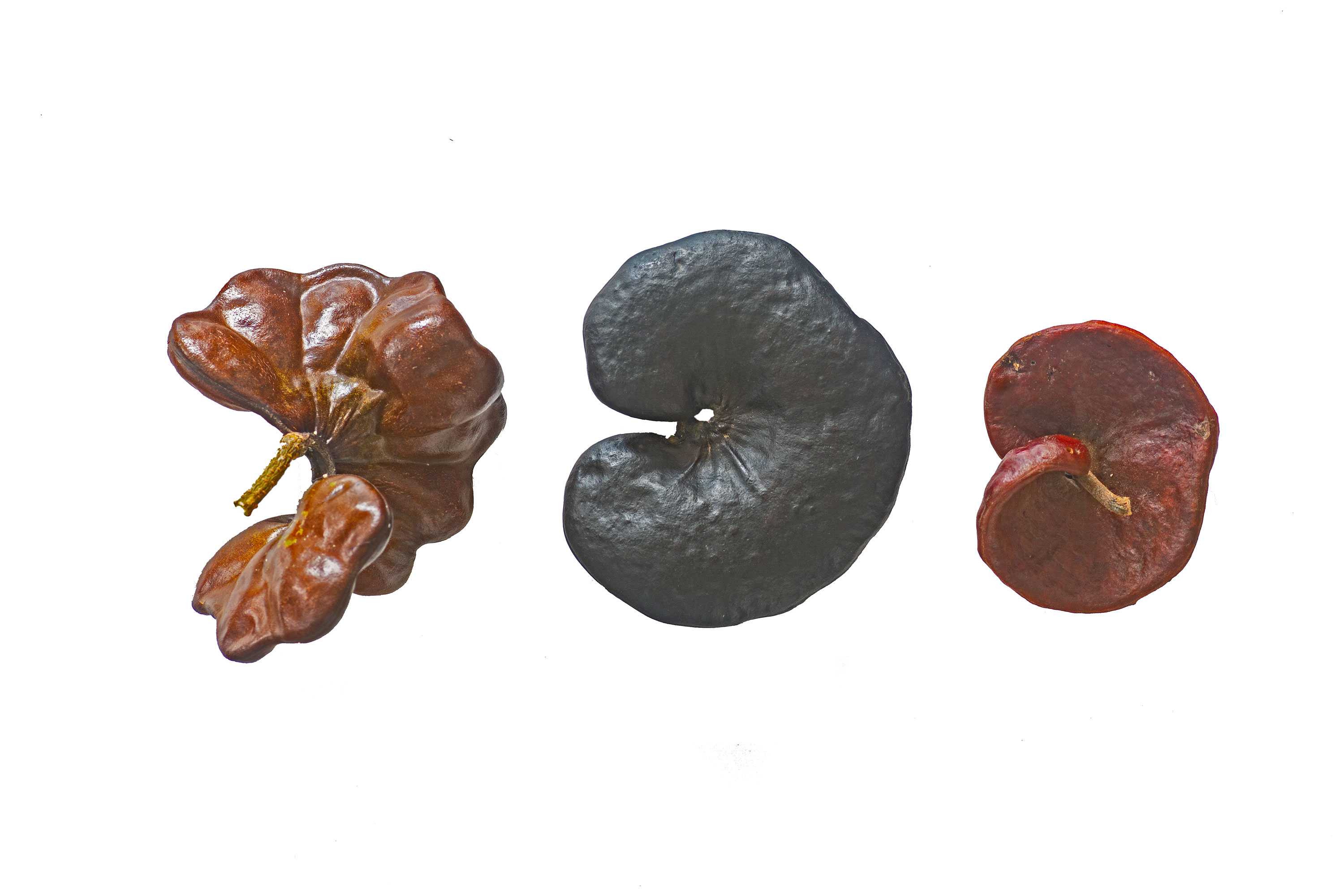
Comparison of the fruits of three sympatric species of Enterolobium. E. schomburgkii is the one to the right.

Robrichia schomburgkii is a species of flowering tree in the family Fabaceae.

== Names ==
Robrichia schomburgkii is also known as "dormidero", because of its minute leaflets reminiscent of Mimosa pudica. Mimosa pudica also called by a similar name ("dormidera").

== Distribution ==
Robrichia schomburgkii ranges from Central America to the Amazon basin and even further south.

== Description ==
Robrichia schomburgkii differs from the similar, sympatric, Enterolobium cyclocarpum by smaller and smoother pods, and by its noticeably smaller, and more numerous leaflets. Unlike other species in the genus, seeds are smaller (<1 cm), its wood is reported to be denser than, for instance, Enterolobium cyclocarpum's. and it is reported to bear fruit only every two to three years
