= Macropophora worontzowi =

Scientific classification
- Domain: Eukaryota
- Kingdom: Animalia
- Phylum: Arthropoda
- Class: Insecta
- Order: Coleoptera
- Suborder: Polyphaga
- Infraorder: Cucujiformia
- Family: Cerambycidae
- Genus: Macropophora
- Species: M. worontzowi

Binomial name
- Macropophora worontzowi Lane, 1938

Species of beetle

Macropophora worontzowi is a species of beetle in the family Cerambycidae. It was described by Lane in 1938.
