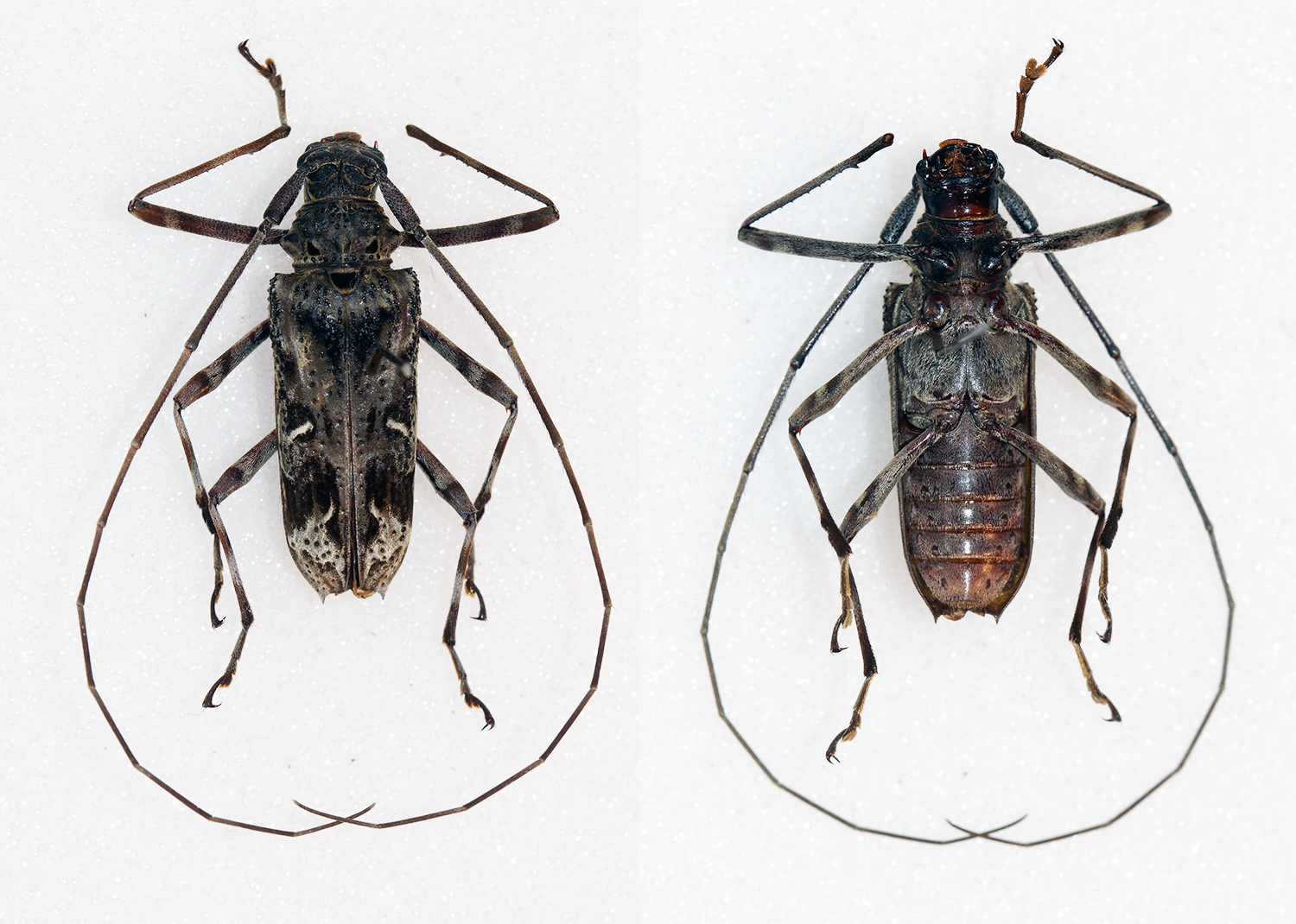

Scientific classification
- Kingdom: Animalia
- Phylum: Arthropoda
- Clade: Pancrustacea
- Class: Insecta
- Order: Coleoptera
- Suborder: Polyphaga
- Infraorder: Cucujiformia
- Family: Cerambycidae
- Genus: Macropophora
- Species: M. accentifer

Binomial name
- Macropophora accentifer (Olivier, 1800)

Synonyms
- Prionus accentifer Olivier, 1800

= Macropophora accentifer =

Species of beetle

Macropophora accentifer is a species of beetle in the family Cerambycidae. It was described by Guillaume-Antoine Olivier in 1795. It is found in Bolivia, Brazil (Mato Grosso, Goiás, Mato Grosso do Sul, Pernambuco, Bahia, Minas Gerais, Espirito Santo, Rio de Janeiro, São Paulo, Paraná, Santa Catarina, Rio Grande do Sul), Paraguay, Argentina and Uruguay.
