= Macropophora lacordairei =

Scientific classification
- Domain: Eukaryota
- Kingdom: Animalia
- Phylum: Arthropoda
- Class: Insecta
- Order: Coleoptera
- Suborder: Polyphaga
- Infraorder: Cucujiformia
- Family: Cerambycidae
- Genus: Macropophora
- Species: M. lacordairei

Binomial name
- Macropophora lacordairei Lepesme, 1946

Species of beetle

Macropophora lacordairei is a species of beetle in the family Cerambycidae. It was described by Lepesme in 1946.
