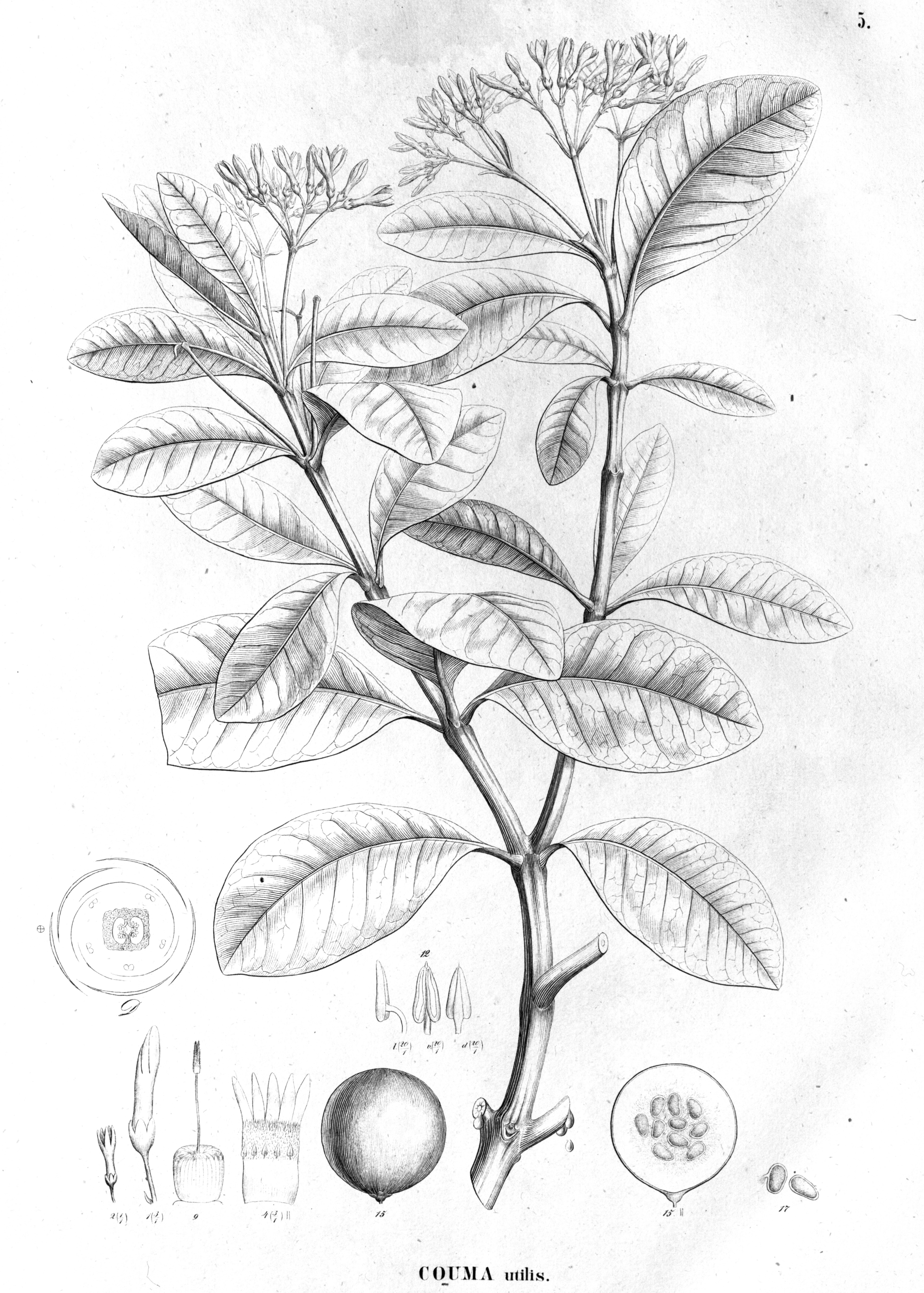
- Botanical illustration

Scientific classification
- Kingdom: Plantae
- Clade: Tracheophytes
- Clade: Angiosperms
- Clade: Eudicots
- Clade: Asterids
- Order: Gentianales
- Family: Apocynaceae
- Genus: Couma
- Species: C. utilis

Binomial name
- Couma utilis (Mart.) Müll.Arg.

Synonyms
- Collophora utilis Mart.; Couma dulcis Spruce ex Müll.Arg.; Couma multinervis Monach.

= Couma utilis =

Species of plant in the family Apocynaceae

Couma utilis, called the milk tree, sorvinha, sorveira, sorva (a name it shares with its larger relative Couma macrocarpa), and sorva-pequena, is a species of flowering plant in the subfamily Rauvolfioideae, native to the Orinoco and Amazon basins of South America. It is thought that C. utilis was on the verge of being domesticated by indigenous Amazonian peoples prior to the arrival of Europeans in the New World.

== Description ==
Couma utilis is usually a tree 5 to 15 m (20 to 50 ft) tall, and occasionally a bush reaching only 2 m (7 ft). Its bark is smooth and dark brown. When cut it exudes large quantities of white latex. Its root system usually consists of a taproot reaching down 1 to 2 m (3 to 7 ft), more in softer soils, and superficial roots that extend far beyond the dripline.

Its simple, entire leaves are oppositely arranged, with three leaves at branch termini. Leaf blades are elliptic, 2 to 4 cm (0.8 to 2 in) wide and 5 to 10 cm (2 to 4 in) long, with rounded to subobtuse apices. Leaf bases are cuneate and extend decurrently onto the petiole. They have no stipules, and their petioles are 5 to 10 mm (0.2 to 0.4 in) long. The prominent leaf veins run parallel, and the leaves themselves are coriaceous and glabrous, colored dark green adaxially and light green abaxially.

C. utilis has corymbose, axillary inflorescences with 1 to 3 flowers that are 2 to 4 cm (0.8 to 2 in) in total length. The cupped calyxes are about 3 mm (0.1 in) long with five obtuse 2 mm (0.08 in) long lobes. Corollas form tubes about 8 mm (0.3 in) long, each with four or five 5 mm (0.2 in) long lobes. The flowers are pink to purple, with five stamens inserted into the tube. Ovaries have numerous ovules. Flowering season is April through June.

The fruits mature in August through September, with some coming out of season. The fruits are globose berries, 1 to 4 cm (0.4 to 2 in) in diameter and averaging 15.4 g (0.54 oz). They hang in bunches of one to five from long peduncles. Unripe fruit are typically dark green turning brown and soft when ripe. They are often harvested unripe. Once fully ripe they are quite soft, with a leathery, 1 mm (0.04 in) thick exocarp. There are numerous soft, flattened, 3 to 4 mm (0.1 to 0.2 in) diameter seeds distributed evenly in the fleshy, sweet mesocarp.

== Cultivation ==
C. utilis grows well in the nutrient poor oxisols of the Amazon rainforest, preferring wet but unflooded areas between sea level and 500 m (1,600 ft) elevation. It also grows in anthropogenically disturbed soils, unlike its wilder congeners C. macrocarpa and C. guianensis. In cultivation in the central Amazon, a tree produces almost 40 kg (88 lb) of fruit per year, a yield of about 15 t/ha (6.0 long ton/acre; 6.7 short ton/acre).

== Uses ==
As its specific epithet implies, Couma utilis has many uses. Its fruits are delectable and available in market towns such as Manaus and Belém. Sometimes the pulp is used as flavor for ice cream. Its latex has many uses, including as a base (commercially called pendare) for chewing gum, for boat-caulking and for whitewashing houses. The raw latex is sweet and is used as a milk substitute by people in areas where dairy milk is not readily available. Its wood is occasionally used for construction and cabinetry. It is planted as an ornamental tree for its profusion of attractive pink to light purple flowers.
