= Robrichia =

Scientific classification
- Kingdom: Plantae
- Clade: Tracheophytes
- Clade: Angiosperms
- Clade: Eudicots
- Clade: Rosids
- Order: Fabales
- Family: Fabaceae
- Subfamily: Caesalpinioideae
- Clade: Mimosoid clade
- Genus: Robrichia (Barneby & J.W.Grimes) A.R.M.Luz & E.R.Souza (2022)

Species
- Robrichia glaziovii (Benth.) A.R.M.Luz & E.R.Souza; Robrichia oldemanii (Barneby & J.W.Grimes) A.R.M.Luz & E.R.Souza; Robrichia schomburgkii (Benth.) A.R.M.Luz & E.R.Souza

Genus of flowering plants

Robrichia is a genus of flowering plants in the legume family (Fabaceae). It includes three species of plants native to the tropical Americas, ranging from southern Mexico to Bolivia and southeastern Brazil.
