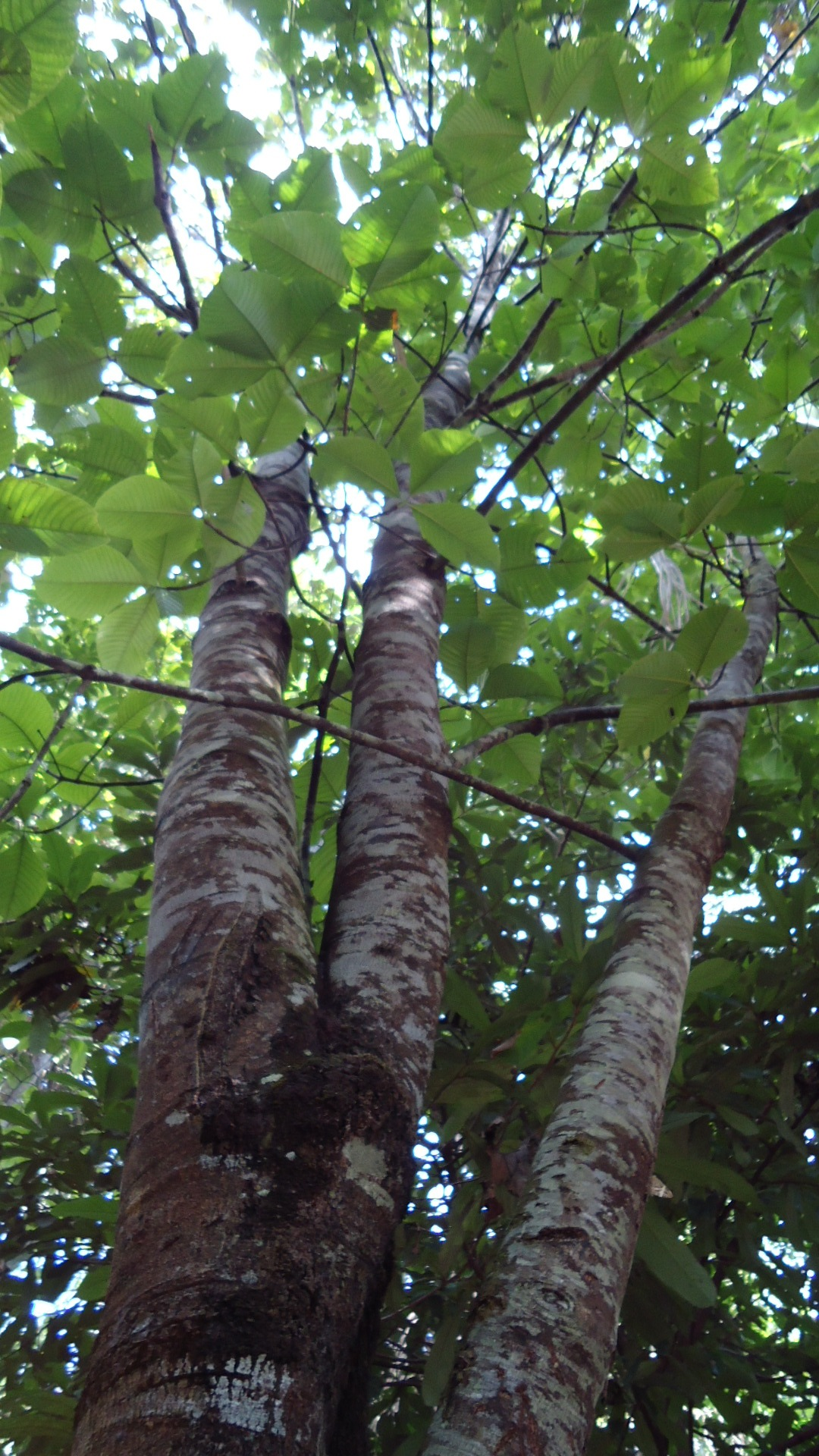

Conservation status
- Least Concern (IUCN 3.1)

Scientific classification
- Kingdom: Plantae
- Clade: Embryophytes
- Clade: Tracheophytes
- Clade: Spermatophytes
- Clade: Angiosperms
- Clade: Eudicots
- Clade: Asterids
- Order: Gentianales
- Family: Apocynaceae
- Genus: Couma
- Species: C. macrocarpa

Binomial name
- Couma macrocarpa Barb.Rodr.

= Couma macrocarpa =

Species of flowering plant

Couma macrocarpa, known by the common names avichure, leche caspi, leche huayo, sorva (a name it shares with its smaller relative Couma utilis), and cow tree, is a species of tropical plant native to tropical, humid Central and South America from Belize to Bolivia.

Ideal environmental conditions for Couma macrocarpa are:

- average annual maximum temperature of 25.1 °C
- average annual minimum temperature of 17.2 °C
- average annual precipitation: 3,419 mm. (max) and 1,020 mm (min).

It is found at variable altitudes from sea level to 1000 metres, in non-flooding areas with good drainage and in soils of good fertility. It adapts well to ultisols and oxisols and can tolerate long dry periods.

In the Peruvian Amazon it is cultivated for its latex. It is grown in Loreto, San Martín, Ucayali, Madre de Dios, Huánuco, and Pasco. The sticky white latex is eaten for treating diarrhea and skin ailments. It is used for patching, sealing and to waterproof canoes. The latex has been harvested for use in plastics and rubber. The fruits are chewy, milky, and sweet-tasting and attract monkeys.
