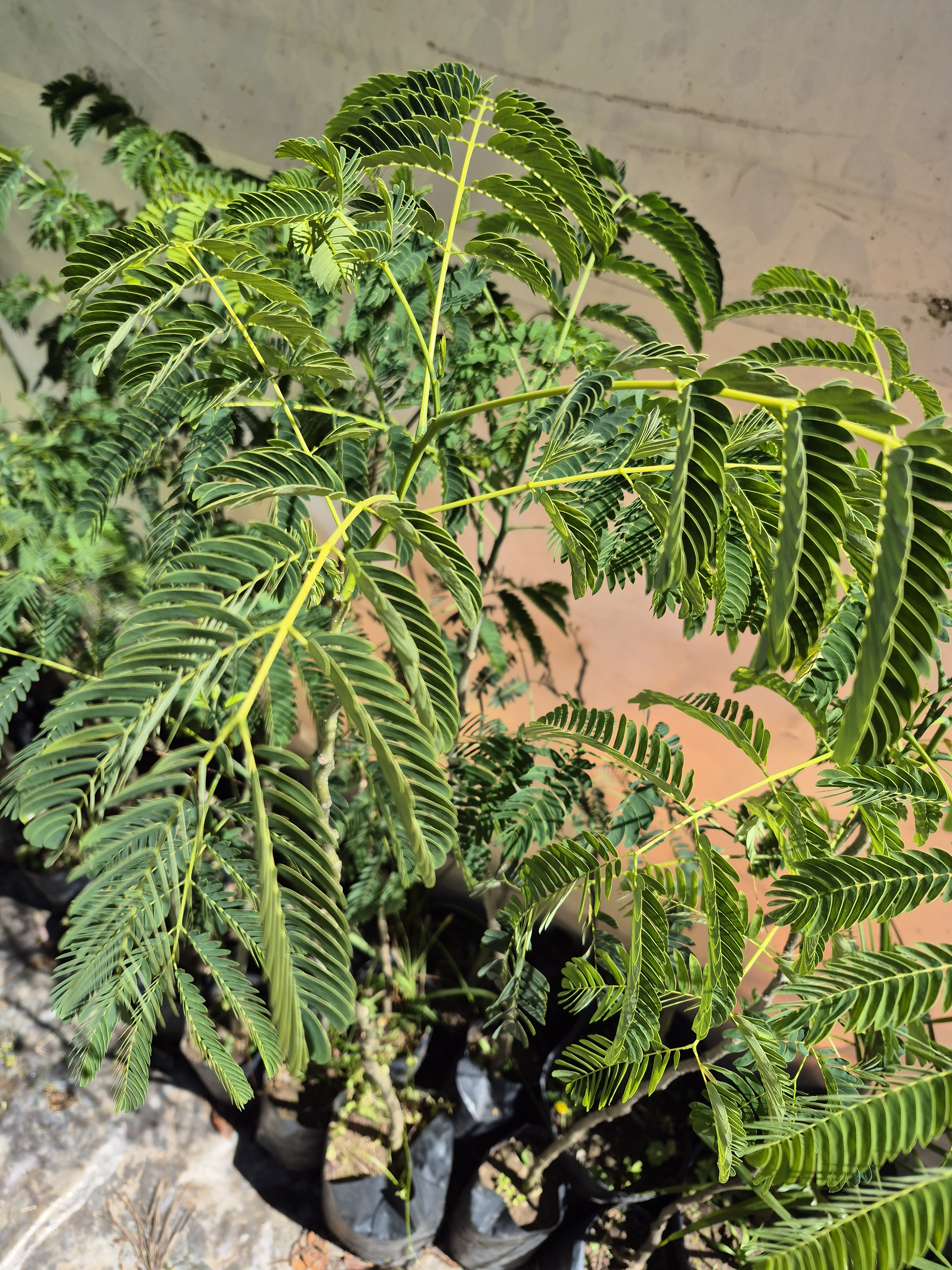

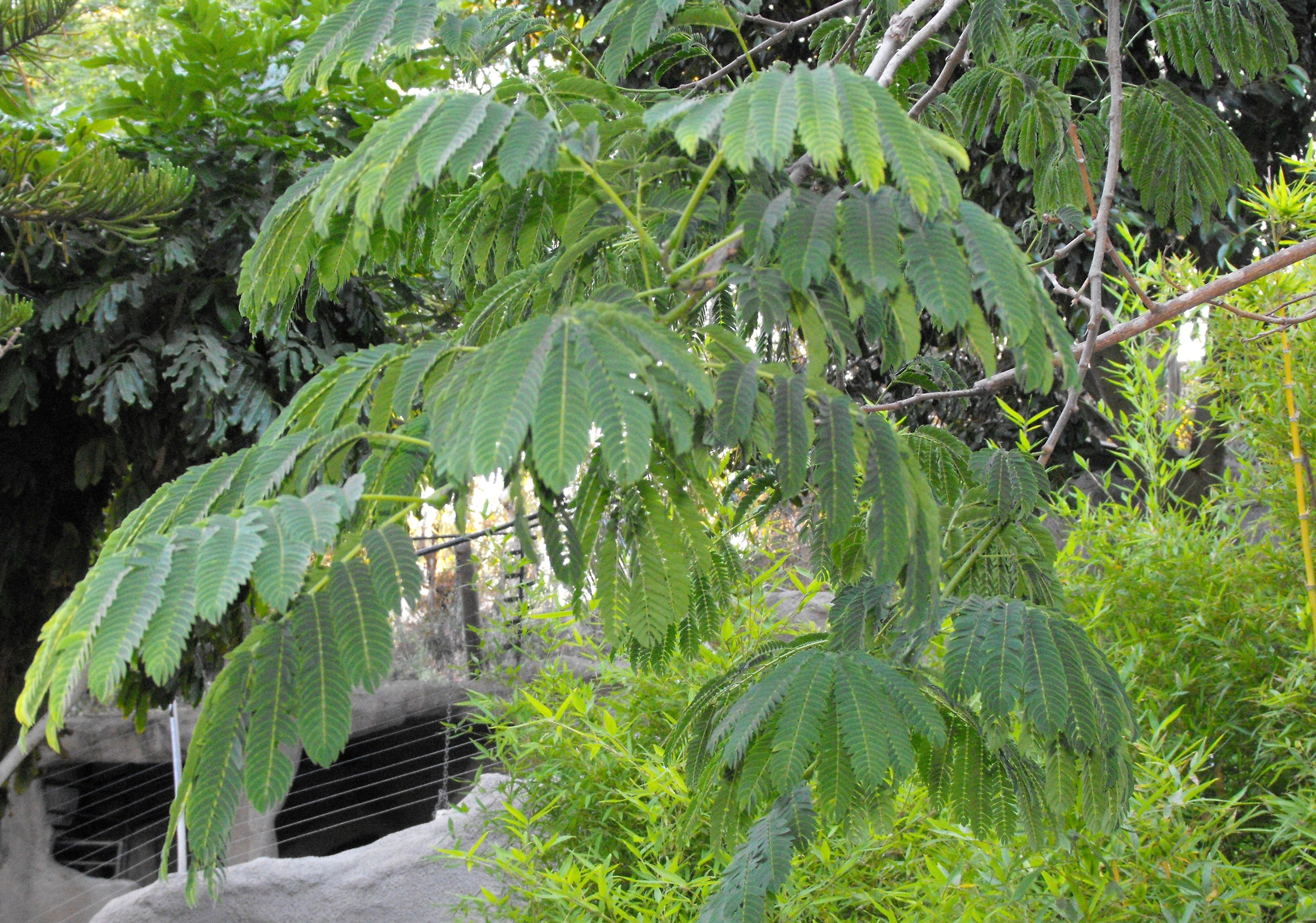

Scientific classification
- Kingdom: Plantae
- Clade: Tracheophytes
- Clade: Angiosperms
- Clade: Eudicots
- Clade: Rosids
- Order: Fabales
- Family: Fabaceae
- Subfamily: Caesalpinioideae
- Clade: Mimosoid clade
- Genus: Enterolobium
- Species: E. contortisiliquum

Binomial name
- Enterolobium contortisiliquum (Vell.) Morong

= Enterolobium contortisiliquum =

Species of legume

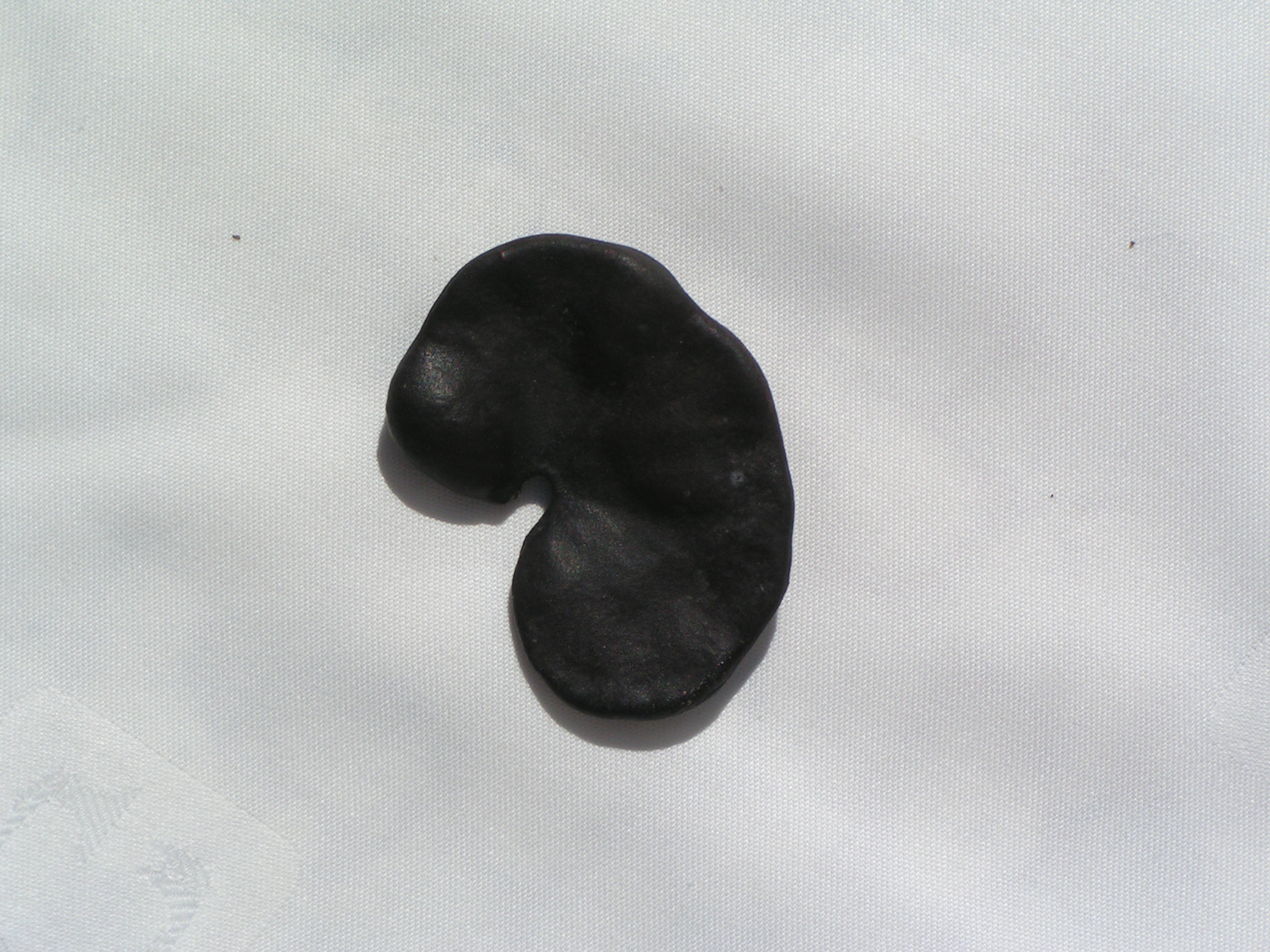
Fruit

Enterolobium contortisiliquum, commonly known as the pacara earpod tree, is a species of flowering tree in the family Fabaceae.
