= Beauchene Island =

- Island
- Beauchene Island located within the Falkland archipelago
- Coordinates: 52°53′11″S 59°12′13″W
- Country: Falkland Islands
- Named for: Jacques Gouin de Beauchêne

Area
  - Total: 1.72 km^{2} (0.66 sq mi)
- Highest elevation: 70 m (230 ft)

Population (2001)
  - Total: 0
  - Density: 0.0/km^{2} (0.0/sq mi)
- Time zone: UTC−3 (FKST)
- If shown, area and population ranks are for all islands and all inhabited islands in the Falklands respectively.

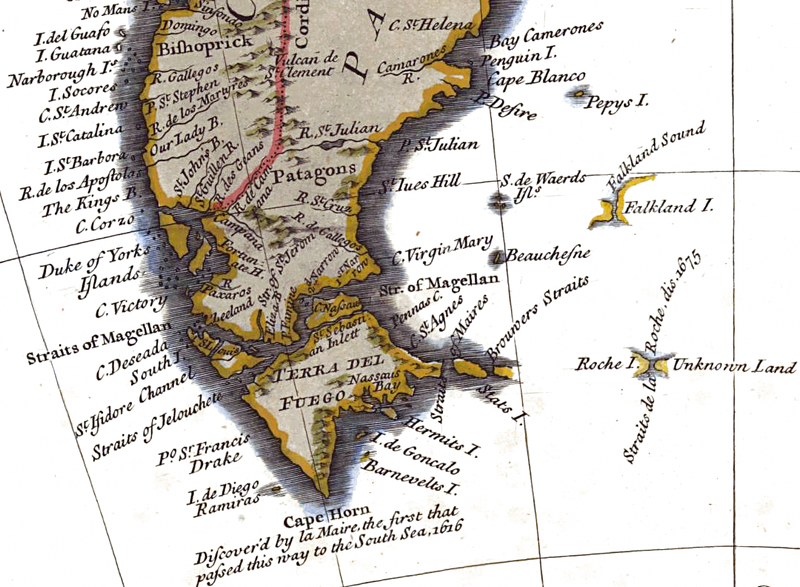
Beauchene Island depicted on an 18th-century map, much further west than actual position (R.W. Seale, c. 1745, fragment)

Beauchene Island is the southernmost of the Falkland Islands, lying about 54 kilometres (34 mi) south of Porpoise Point in Lafonia. It was discovered in 1701 by Jacques Gouin de Beauchêne, after whom it was named.

== Geography ==
Beauchene is the most isolated island of the Falkland archipelago. It is uninhabited, free of introduced predators and, because it is so remote, has been protected from disturbance. It is 172 hectares (430 acres) in area. The north of the island is covered in dense tussac grass with boulder beaches on the western coast and sloping up gently to about 30 metres (100 ft) in height. In the south of the island the land rises to around 70 metres (230 ft). There are higher cliffs on the eastern coast and the "southern quarter of the island is almost bare of vegetation."

The island has a natural anchorage on the east side of the island that can only be used in fair weather. There is no resident population and visitors require the permission of the Falkland Islands Executive Committee. A typical example was a request by Falklands Conservation to make three visits in October 2010, January 2011 and March 2011 for the purpose of taking a bird census. In their application, it was noted that nobody had set foot on the island since a visit by the Shallow Marine Survey Group (SMSG) in December 2009.

== History ==
Anthony de la Roché may have sighted Beauchene Island as early as April 1675. However this is by no means certain: de la Roché had rounded Cape Horn and was blown off course. The island visited is usually said to be South Georgia, which fits his descriptions better, particularly of high ice-covered mountains and bays, in one of which he anchored for a fortnight (see the Seixas y Lovera narrative), but supporters of Argentina's claim to South Georgia more often claim it was Beauchene.

A while after its official discovery in 1701 by Jacques Gouin de Beauchêne, seal trappers tried unsuccessfully to settle the island.

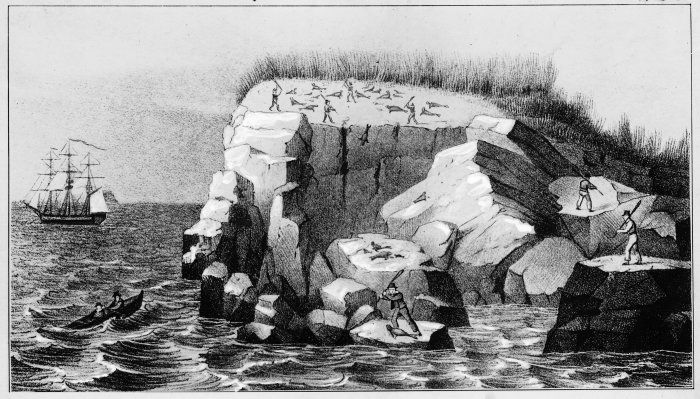
1833 image of a seal rookery, Beauchene Island, Falkland Islands

In 1834, the American McArthur landed 100 people on the island, driving the local sea lions to extinction (they have since returned).

Although the island is uninhabited, there are ruins of a group of houses built in the 1830s on the west side of the island.

The first proper scientific expedition landed in 1951 by helicopter, staying for a month.

During the Falklands War, there was an Argentine wreck on a reef just south of the islands, and British soldiers lived for around four weeks there.

== Flora and fauna ==
The island is a nature reserve. It is covered in tussac grass and is known for its caves and for its peat, which forms around ten times faster than anywhere else in the world. Apart from the tussac, plants found on the island include wild celery, Antarctic starwort and bittercress.

The island has been identified by BirdLife International as an Important Bird Area. Over 30 species have been recorded, including gentoo penguins (750 breeding pairs), southern rockhopper penguins (60,000 pairs), macaroni penguins, Magellanic penguins, black-browed albatrosses (100,000 pairs), fairy prions (10,000 pairs), sooty shearwaters, Wilson's storm-petrels, grey-backed storm-petrels, common diving petrels, southern giant petrels, imperial shags (2500 pairs), striated caracaras (65 pairs), blackish cinclodes, Cobb's wrens and white-bridled finches. South American sea lions breed in small numbers on the island, which is a major haulout site for non-breeding animals.

== See also ==
- Anthony de la Roché
