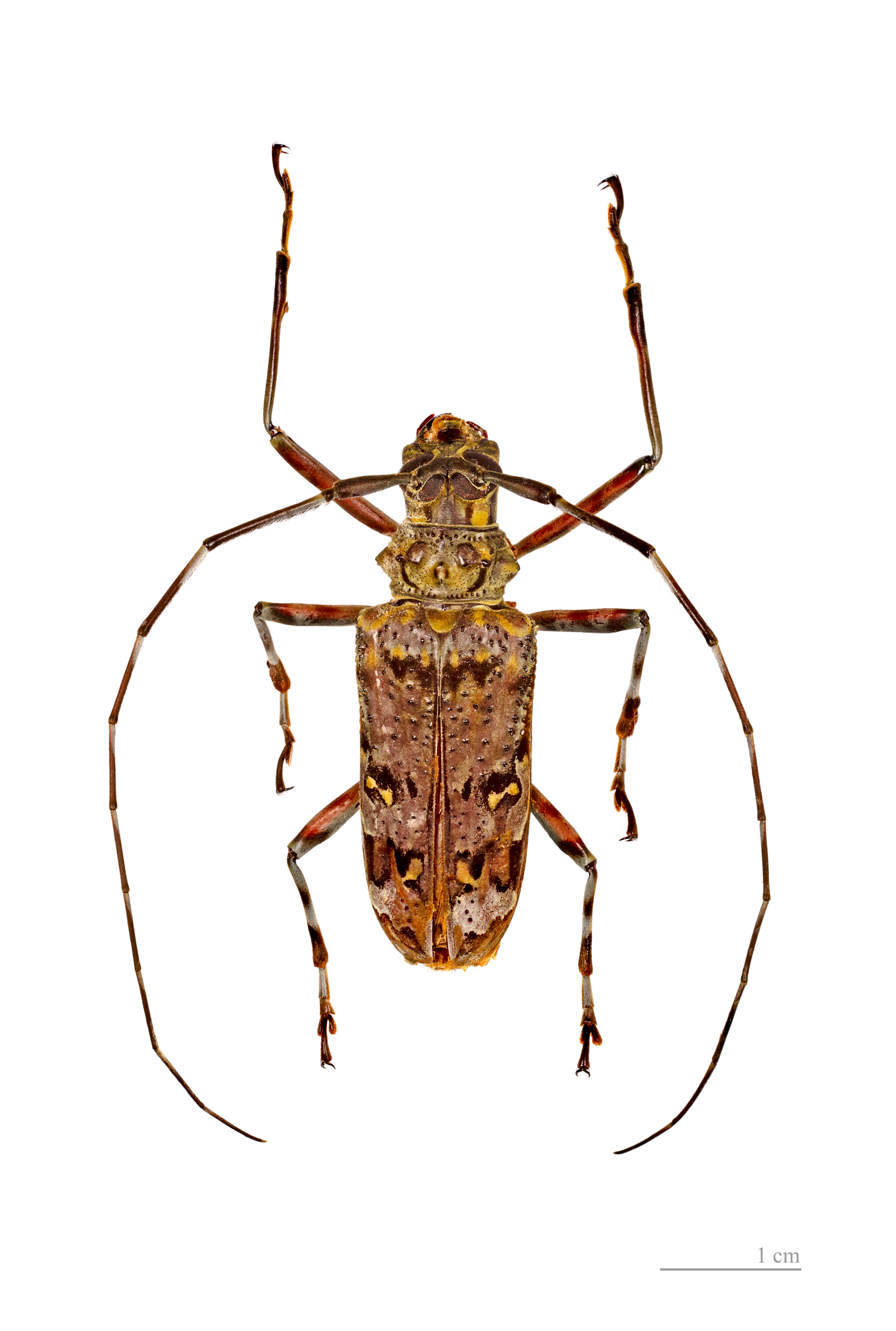
- Macropophora trochlearis MHNT

Scientific classification
- Domain: Eukaryota
- Kingdom: Animalia
- Phylum: Arthropoda
- Class: Insecta
- Order: Coleoptera
- Suborder: Polyphaga
- Infraorder: Cucujiformia
- Family: Cerambycidae
- Tribe: Acrocinini
- Genus: Macropophora

= Macropophora =

Genus of beetles

Macropophora is a genus of beetles in the family Cerambycidae, containing the following species:

- Macropophora accentifer (Olivier, 1795)
- Macropophora lacordairei Lepesme, 1946
- Macropophora trochlearis (Linnaeus, 1758)
- Macropophora worontzowi Lane, 1938
