= Jacques Gouin de Beauchêne =

French explorer and leader (1652-1730)

- Born: 2 January 1652; Saint-Malo, Brittany, Kingdom of France
- Died: 26 July 1730 (aged 78); Saint-Malo, Kingdom of France
- Occupation: Explorer

Jacques Gouin de Beauchêne (French pronunciation: [ʒak ɡwɛ̃ də boʃɛn]; 2 January 1652 – 26 July 1730) was a French explorer and leader of the first French trading expedition to the Pacific. His name is also spelled as Beauchesne. He was born in Saint-Malo in Brittany, and died there at 78 years of age.

As captain of the Phelypeaux, he led a fleet of four ships from France in 1698; however, only the Phelypeaux and the Comte-de-Maurepas made it through the Strait of Magellan in 1699 after an arduous winter passage. He named one of the islands in the Strait after King Louis XIV, and a bay after Louis, le Grand Dauphin. After a trading cruise along the coast of Chile and Peru, taking in a visit to the Galapagos Islands, he returned via Cape Horn, passing the Cape on 9 January 1701. Ten days later, he discovered the island that was named for him, Beauchene Island. He was the first Frenchman to sail Cape Horn from west to east.
