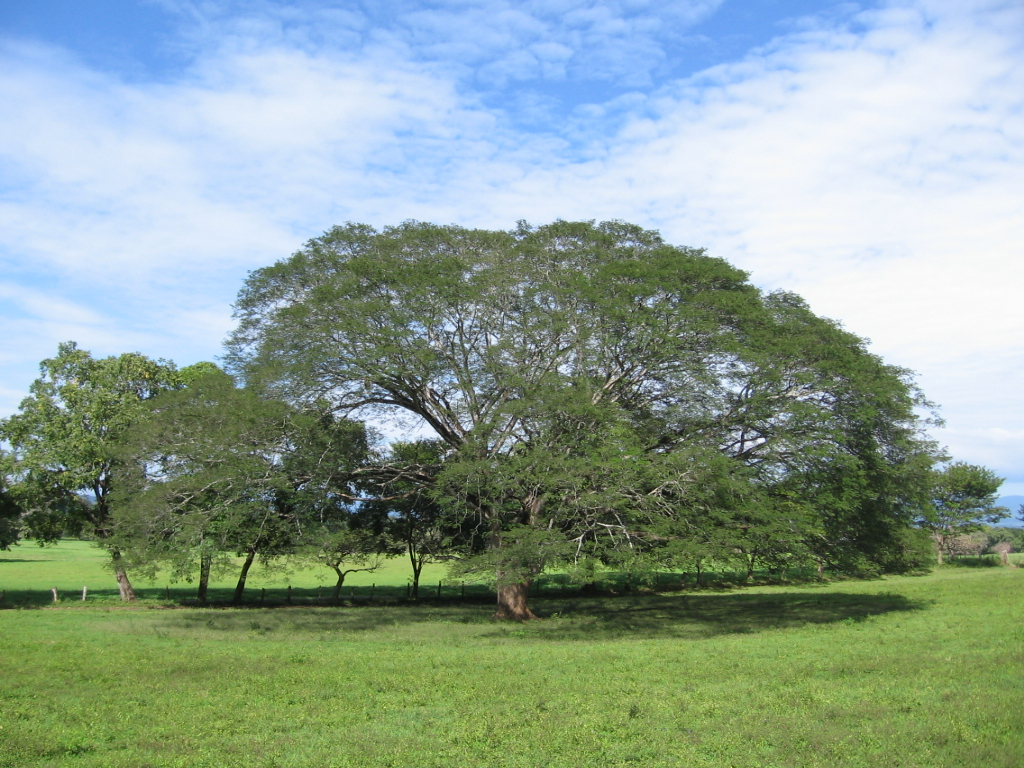
- Enterolobium cyclocarpum

Scientific classification
- Kingdom: Plantae
- Clade: Tracheophytes
- Clade: Angiosperms
- Clade: Eudicots
- Clade: Rosids
- Order: Fabales
- Family: Fabaceae
- Subfamily: Caesalpinioideae
- Clade: Mimosoid clade
- Genus: Enterolobium; Mart.

Species
- See text

= Enterolobium =

Genus of legumes

Enterolobium is a genus of 12 species of flowering plants in the family Fabaceae, native to tropical and warm-temperate regions of the Americas. They are medium-sized to large trees.

== Species ==
Eight species are accepted.

- Enterolobium barinense L.Cárdenas & H.Rodr.-Carr.
- Enterolobium barnebianum Mesquita & M.F.Silva
- Enterolobium contortisiliquum (Vell.) Morong
- Enterolobium cyclocarpum (Jacq.) Griseb. - Guanacaste (Central Mexico south to Northern Brazil)
- Enterolobium gummiferum (Mart.) J.F.Macbr.
- Enterolobium maximum Ducke
- Enterolobium monjollo Benth.
- Enterolobium timbouva Mart.
