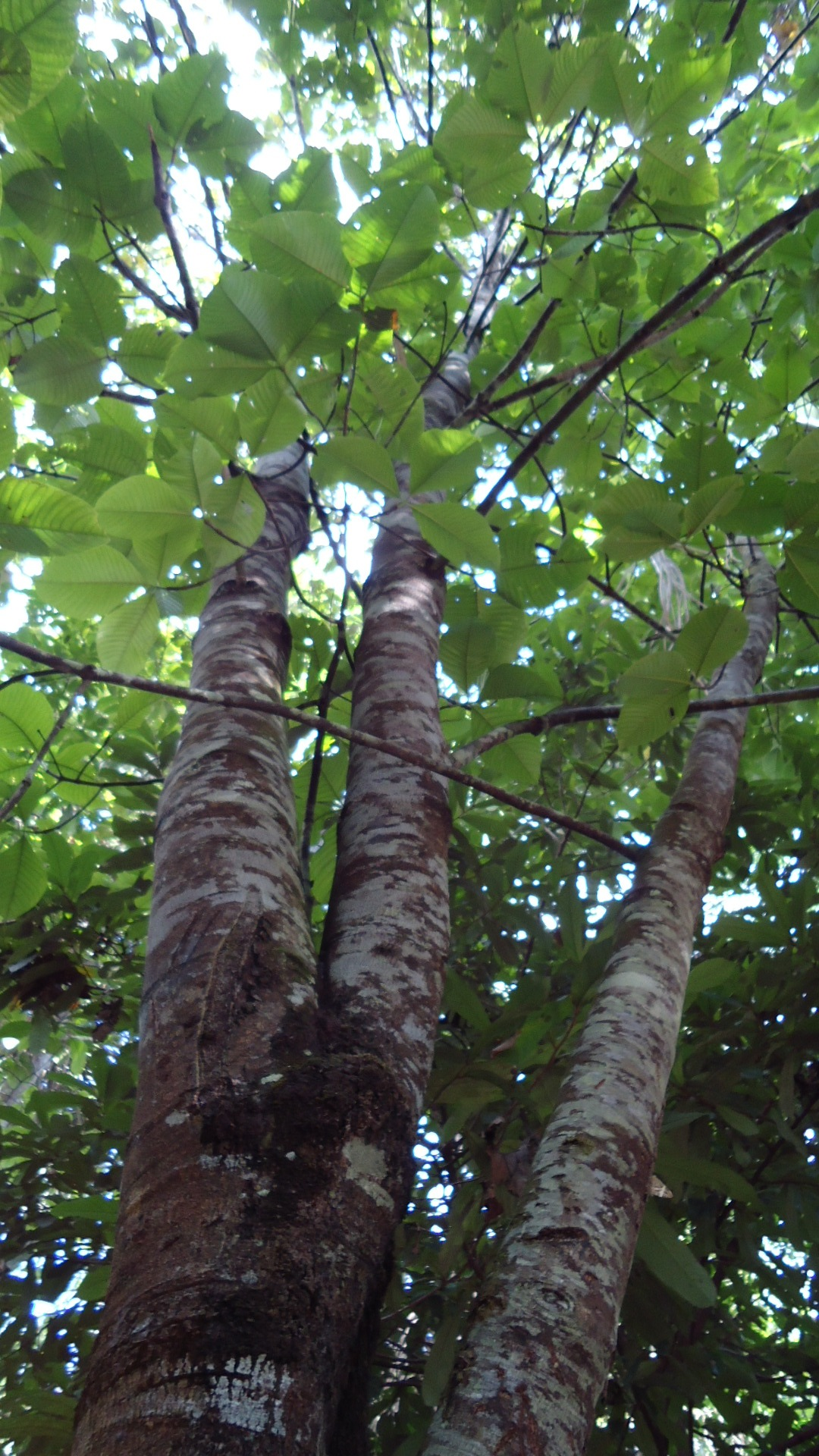
- Couma macrocarpa

Scientific classification
- Kingdom: Plantae
- Clade: Tracheophytes
- Clade: Angiosperms
- Clade: Eudicots
- Clade: Asterids
- Order: Gentianales
- Family: Apocynaceae
- Subfamily: Rauvolfioideae
- Tribe: Willughbeieae
- Subtribe: Lacmelleinae
- Genus: Couma; Aubl.

Synonyms
- Collophora Mart.

= Couma =

Genus of plants

Couma is a genus of flowering plants in the family Apocynaceae first described as a genus in 1775. It is native to South America and Central America.

Species

- Couma catingae Ducke - Colombia, Venezuela, Guyana, NW Brazil
- Couma guianensis Aubl. - Pará, the Guianas
- Couma macrocarpa Barb.Rodr. - widespread from Belize to Bolivia
- Couma rigida Müll.Arg. - Venezuela, Guyana, N Brazil
- Couma utilis (Mart.) Müll.Arg. - Colombia, Venezuela, NW Brazil
