= Edmé François Chauvot de Beauchêne =

French physician, surgeon and anatomist

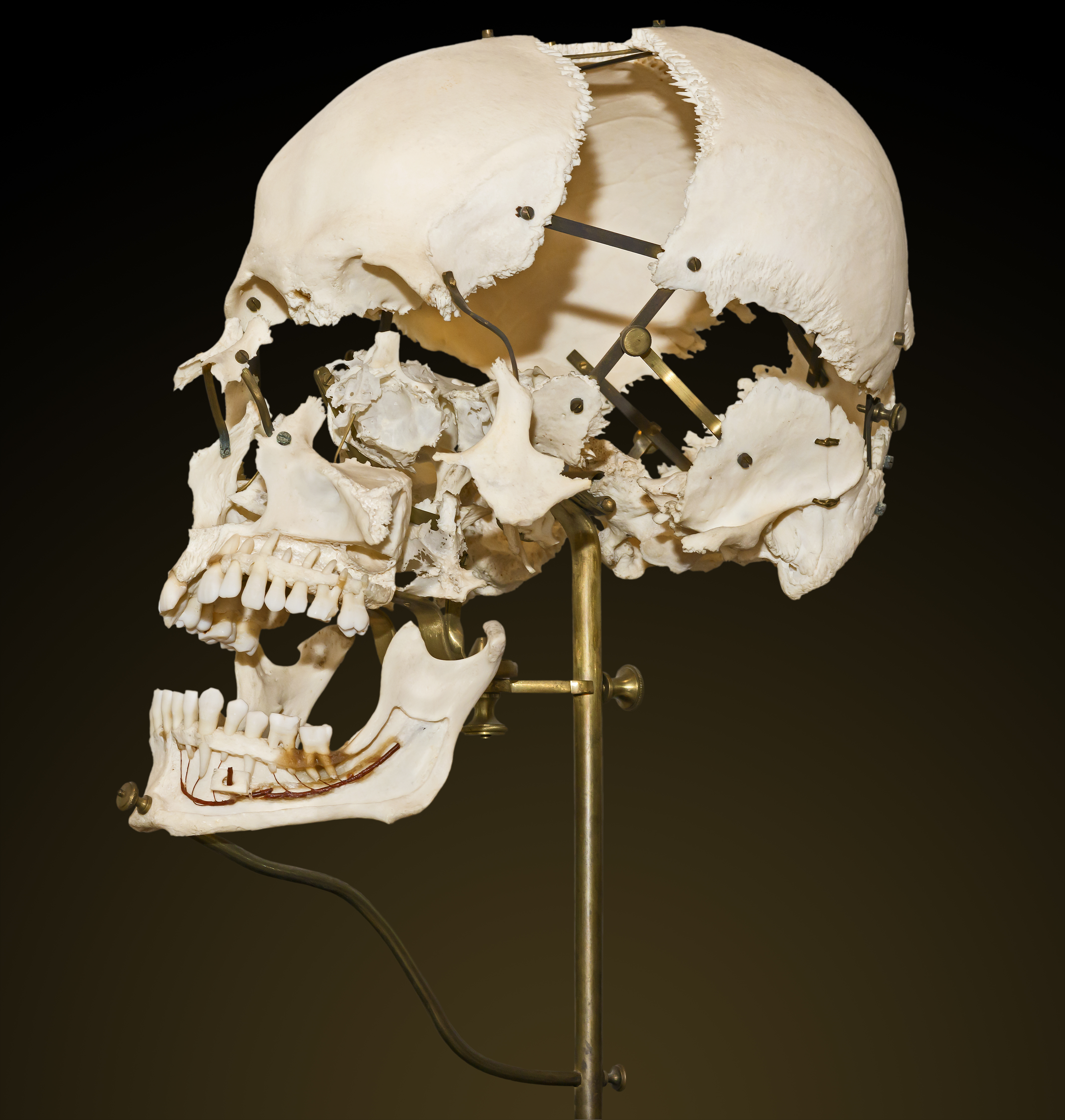
Beauchêne skull supplied by Maison Deyrolle

Edmé François Chauvot de Beauchêne (1780, Île-de-France – 1830, Paris) was a French medical doctor, surgeon and anatomist. He was Chief of l'hopital Saint-Antoine Paris, the Deputy Chief of Anatomical Works of the Faculté de Médecine de Paris (both part of the University of France) and deputy head surgeon at Saint-Antoine. He was a member of the Société Anatomique de Paris and a Member of l'Academie de Médecine d'Île-de-France as well being the personal physician of Louis XVIII and the surgeon of Charles X. He is buried in Père-Lachaise Cemetery.

Edmé François Chauvot de Beauchêne was the inventor of the disarticulated or exploded human skull used for medical teaching, known as the Beauchêne skull. The skull bones are disarticulated along the sutures and mounted at a distance on brass supports. The bones are attached to the brass rods by rivets and the assembly is mounted on independent adjustable and modular brass rods which allow the jaw to advance and the top of the skull to be tilted back. Dentition is revealed with dissection of the left cortical bone showing the dental roots and with the nerve branches pigmented in red. One fabricator was Maison Tramond, 9, rue de l'ecole de Medicine, Paris. The skulls were supplied by the medical school.

== Other sources ==
- Spinner, Robert J.; Wolanskyj, Alexandra P. (2012). "The arduous journey to find a portrait of Beauchêne fils, A Famous Anatomist and Surgeon". Clinical Anatomy. 25 (6): 683–686. doi:10.1002/ca.22050. PMID 22374785. S2CID 205536694.
- Spinner, Robert J.; Wolanskyj-Spinner, Alexandra P. (2018). "Retracing the observations and footsteps of Beauchêne fils: A blueprint for scientific research". Clinical Anatomy. 31 (8): 1194–1198. doi:10.1002/ca.23258. PMID 30117198. S2CID 52021208.
