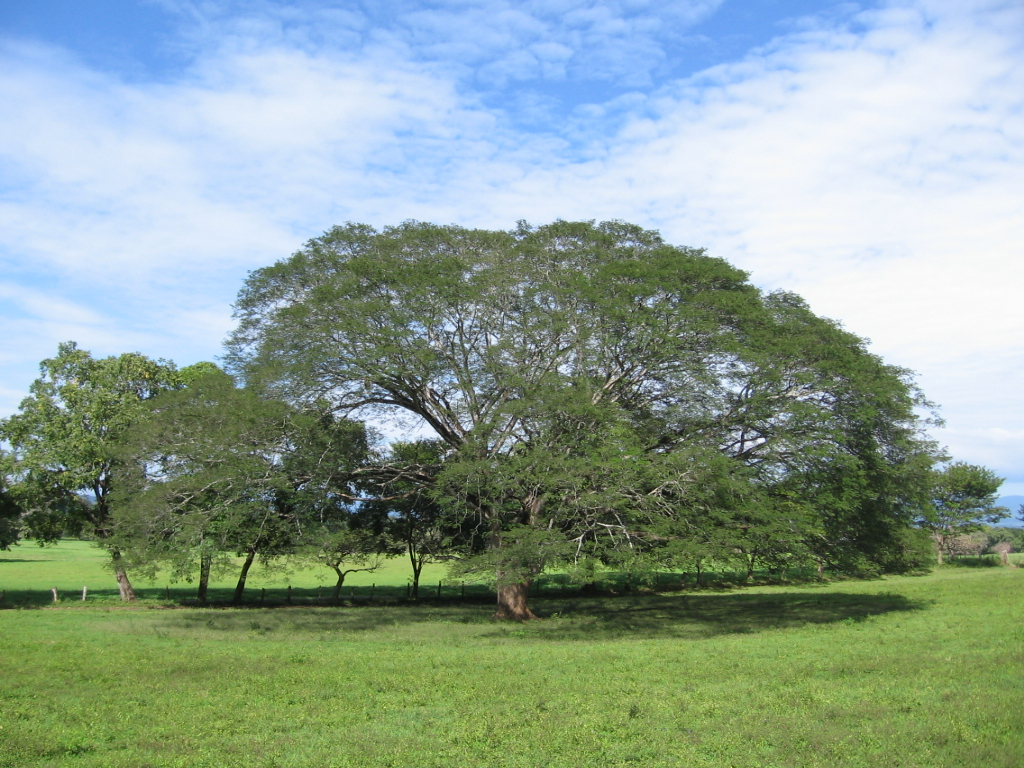
- Specimen in El Canchol, Guanacaste (Costa Rica)

Conservation status
- Least Concern (IUCN 3.1)

Scientific classification
- Kingdom: Plantae
- Clade: Tracheophytes
- Clade: Angiosperms
- Clade: Eudicots
- Clade: Rosids
- Order: Fabales
- Family: Fabaceae
- Subfamily: Caesalpinioideae
- Clade: Mimosoid clade
- Genus: Enterolobium
- Species: E. cyclocarpum

Binomial name
- Enterolobium cyclocarpum (Jacq.) Griseb.

Synonyms
- Several, see text

= Enterolobium cyclocarpum =

Species of legume

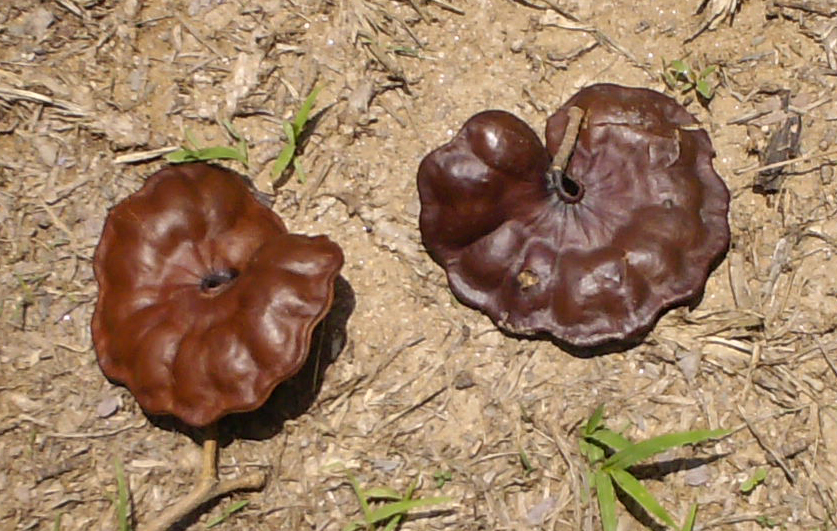
Elephant-ear shape seedpods

Enterolobium cyclocarpum, commonly known as conacaste, guanacaste, caro caro, devil's ear tree, monkey-ear tree, or elephant-ear tree, is a species of flowering tree in the family Fabaceae, that is native to tropical regions of the Americas, from central Mexico south to northern Brazil (Roraima) and Venezuela. It is known for its large proportions, expansive, often spherical crown, and curiously shaped seedpods. The abundance of this tree, especially in Guanacaste Province, Costa Rica, where it is prized for the shady relief it provides from the intense sun, coupled with its immensity, have made it a widely recognized species. It is the national tree of Costa Rica.

In North America, it is often called elephant-ear tree, due to the shape of the seedpods. Other common names include devil's ear and earpod tree, parota, and orejón (Spanish) or huanacaxtle (Nahuatl). In El Salvador, it is known as conacaste. In the Yucatán Peninsula, it is known by the Mayan name, pich. In Panama, it is known as a corotú.

== Description ==
The guanacaste is a medium-sized to large tree, growing to 25–35 m (82–115 ft) tall, with a trunk up to 3.5 m (11 ft) in diameter. Unusual in a tree of these proportions, buttresses are completely lacking. The bark is light gray, with prominent dark reddish-brown, vertical fissures. In young trees, these fissures are closer together and their confluence lends a characteristic reddish hue to the bark of guanacaste saplings. Older specimens often present broken, chipped, or scarred bark.

The crown is broad and widely spreading. The height at which branches first occur along the trunk – as well as the overall tree shape – vary considerably among individuals and are habitat-dependent characteristics. Frequently, guanacaste trees grow as single specimens in a sunny pasture. Under these conditions, massive, extended, horizontal limbs emerge low on the boles, forming giant, hemispherical, widely spreading crowns. In the forest (where competition for light is intense), trees tend to become taller, and branching occurs at a higher level. Tree forms then become somewhat narrower, though crowns are still rounded, and hemispherical shapes are maintained by those that have reached the canopy.

The alternate leaves are bipinnate compound, 15–40 cm (5.91–15.75 in) long and 17 cm (6.69 in) broad with a 2–6 cm (0.79–2.36 in) petiole bearing four to 15 pairs of pinnae, each pinna with 40–70 leaflets; the leaflets are slender, oblong, 8–15 mm (0.315–0.591 in) long by 2–4 mm (0.079–0.157 in) wide. Near its base, the twiggy petiole bears a small, raised, oval gland. The leaves are confined to the outer shell of the crown, yet they are plentiful enough to make it moderately dense and green. The guanacaste is evergreen, or briefly deciduous for 1–2 months during the dry season. Most foliage is shed in December, at the start of the dry season. In late February, a growth surge is initiated that re-establishes a fresh, thick crown by April.

Concurrent with the leaves' renewal is the appearance of globular inflorescences (3 cm (1.18 in)) in the axils of the new leaves. Supported by a long pedestal (4 cm (1.57 in)), each spherical white head – composed of about 50 individual flowers – sports thousands of thin, filamentous stamens as its major feature. The blossoms themselves each consist of about 20 stamens and a single pistil, bound together at the base by a short, green, tubular corolla and an even shorter calyx, just 5 mm (0.197 in) long altogether. Guanacaste flowers are very fragrant, and during intense flowering periods, their odor permeates the air for many meters in all directions. In Manuel Antonio National Park near Quepos, Costa Rica, flowering lasts from late February to early April.

Surprisingly, no obvious fruiting activity immediately follows the decline of the blossom. Rather, 9–10 months pass before small, green pods first appear high in the crown by December. They reach full size by February and finally begin to ripen in March – a full year after flowering has ceased. Fruit ripening lasts from March to April, as the green pods turn brown in the guanacaste crown and are slowly shed. Vigorous trees produce large crops on a nearly annual basis. In June, guanacaste seedlings can already be seen, germinating in the moist soil of the early rainy season.

Guanacaste fruits are large (7–12 cm (2.8–4.7 in) diameter), glossy dark brown indehiscent and spirally organized pods, shaped like orbicular disks. Their shape suggests the usual Mimosoideae fruit – a long, narrow, flattened pod – taken and wound around an axis perpendicular to its plane. Made of thick, soft tissue with a leathery feel, the pods contain eight to 20 radially arranged seeds, 14.5–17.5 mm (0.571–0.689 in) long, 7.8–11.2 mm (0.307–0.441 in) wide, and 6.2–7.2 mm (0.244–0.283 in) thick and weighing about 1 g. Guanacaste seeds are brown and marked with a conspicuous light brown or orange ring. They are very hard, resembling small stones rather than tree seeds in their strength and durability. For germination to occur, the hard seed coat must be broken to enable water to reach the embryo. Otherwise, the seeds lie dormant indefinitely.

The ardillo (Cojoba arborea) and the iguano (Dilodendron costaricense) possess similar bipinnate leaves with extra-fine leaflets. Though of equal stature, these two trees can be distinguished readily from the guanacaste; the ardillo has tan-colored, heavily wrinkled, and rough bark – while the guanacaste has a gray and vertically cracked cortex. The iguano's leaflets are serrated, while those of the guanacaste are entire.

== Ecology ==
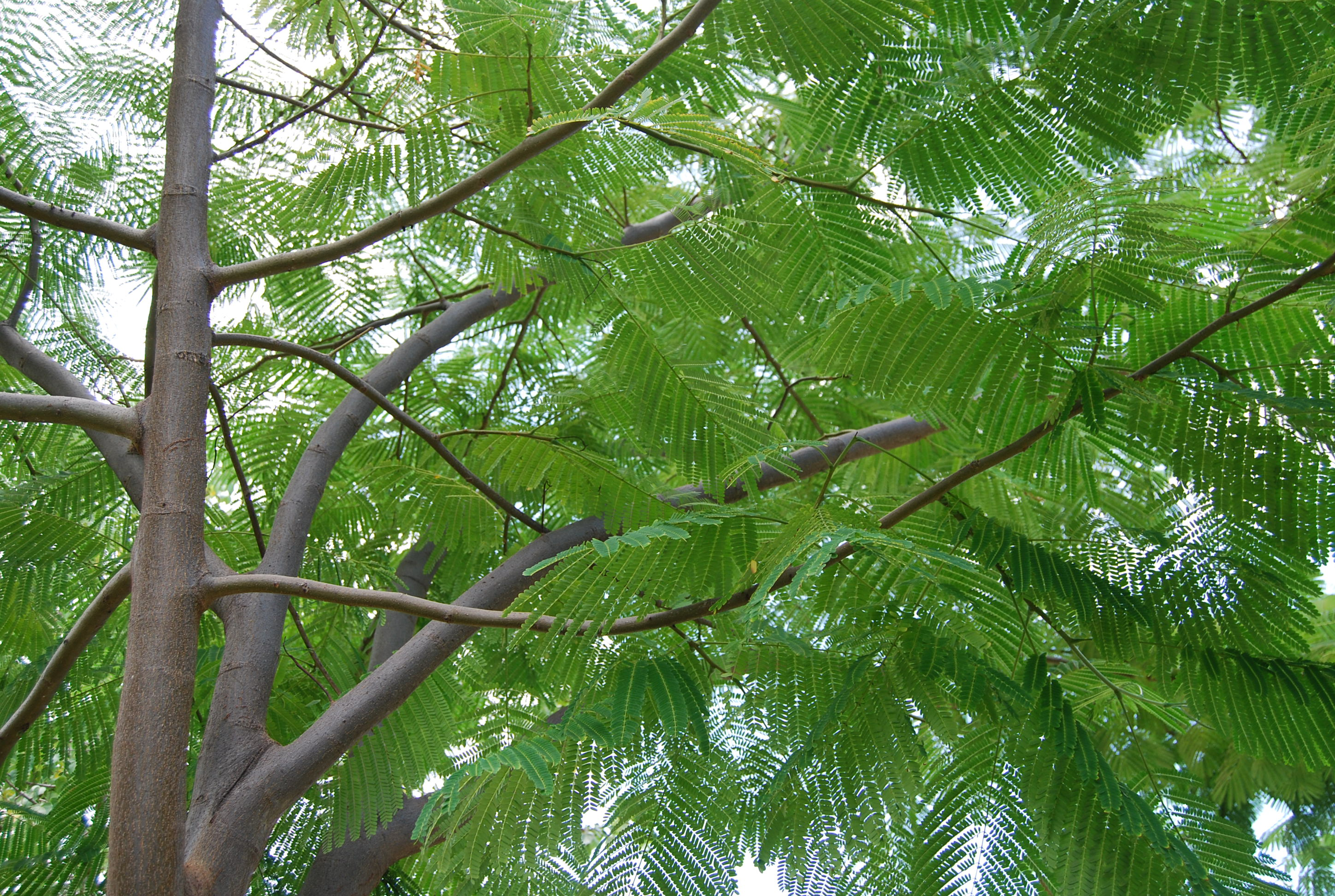
Branches and foliage of a young Enterolobium cyclocarpum, about 3 years old, in Naiguata, Venezuela

Guanacaste trees appear to delay the onset of fruit development—some 9 months—so that seed maturation coincides with the start of the rainy season. This adaptive behavior presumably is an adaptation to give germinating seedlings as much time as possible to establish root systems before the start of the next dry season. Both the jatobá (Hymenaea courbaril) and the cenizaro (Albizia saman) exhibit similar reproductive strategies. Of course, guanacaste trees—like all deciduous and semideciduous species in this part of the world—share in the water-conserving benefits of dry-season leaflessness.

Guanacaste flowers are heavily visited by bees—insects that probably are responsible for pollination, as well. Guanacaste seed pods, however, are completely ignored by native fauna and they accumulate on the forest floor underneath parent trees. The seeds are not eaten by any animals currently native where the tree occurs, rendering the plant an evolutionary anachronism: it has been suggested that guanacaste pods were among the foods exploited by certain species of Pleistocene megafauna that became extinct some 10,000 years ago (e.g. giant ground sloths, giant bison). Within this scenario, the tree remains today without an effective seed-dispersing vector besides humans.

As discussed above, the tough-coated guanacaste seeds do not begin to grow unless their protective covers are punctured in some way. This may be an adaptation designed to keep the seeds from germinating while still in the pods at the start of the rainy season—and very likely still underneath the parent tree after having fallen from its crown. With more time to find them, foraging ground sloths (and other extinct mammals) could eat the pods and transport the seeds to a new site. The resulting mastication and digestion of the fruits would induce seed coat abrasion, which would help seed germination. Nowadays this role of mastication and dispersal has been taken up primarily by horses and cattle.

An insect pest, common to guanacaste trees of the Costa Rican Central Valley, produces spherical green galls of 1.5 cm (0.59 in) diameter on new shoots in February and March. Similar parasitism seems to occur on guanacaste trees of the wet, southwestern lowlands (around Palmar Sur).

== Cultivation and uses ==
An anole lizard climbing a cultivated guanacaste seedling in southern Florida

Tolerant of a wide range of rainfall levels, temperatures, and soil conditions, they can thrive in most low-elevation, tropical habitats. Guanacaste trees are highly valued as ornamentals, and the shade they provide creates many an oasis on the searing and sun-baked plains in its Pacific slope habitat.

It is widely grown as a shade tree to shelter coffee plantations and for shade and forage for cattle; it also improves soil fertility by nitrogen fixation. The guanacaste is found in USDA Growth Zones 10–12.

The wood is reddish-brown, lightweight (density 0.34–0.6 g/cm^{3} (0.20–0.35 oz/cu in)) and water-resistant; it is used to make items such as doors, windows, furniture, and cabinets, and for shipbuilding. The timber provides high chatoyance, with an average value above 20 PZC. It is considered a relatively sustainable resource for wooden furniture and design projects, largely due to the tree's ability to quickly reach large sizes, which also makes it easier to find large natural cuts up to several meters, which is rare for slower-growing woods, such as oak or cedar. The town of La Cruz de Huanacaxtle in Nayarit (Mexico) derives its name from the fact that a cross used to stand there made of guanacaste wood.

While the seed pods are still green, they are harvested and the seeds eaten boiled in Mexico. Healthy guanacaste trees generate massive, nearly annual crops of seeds. The attractive seeds are used in Costa Rica to make jewelry. In parts of Panama, the ripe seeds are heated in a fire until they pop like popcorn. These seeds demonstrate germination rates of nearly 100%. Guanacaste seedlings then grow rapidly, often reaching over 1 m (3 ft 3 in) in height in their first year. These aggressive reproductive characteristics might be beneficially exploited in reforestation projects, though the plant is considered an invasive species in some places. Its roots are strong, and those of large trees may damage nearby structures.

Guanacaste is commonly used to feed all kind of livestock; its foliage, fruits, and seeds are relished by cattle, pigs, goats, sheep, and horses.

The parota tree is believed to provide medical benefits. In Mexican folk medicine, the sap is thought to aid illnesses such as influenza and bronchitis, while the astringent properties of its green fruit are used for diarrhea. The fruit and bark also contain tannins, which are useful for leather curing and soap manufacturing, while the sap can be used as a natural adhesive or substitute for glue, or chewed as a type of gum.

== Synonyms ==
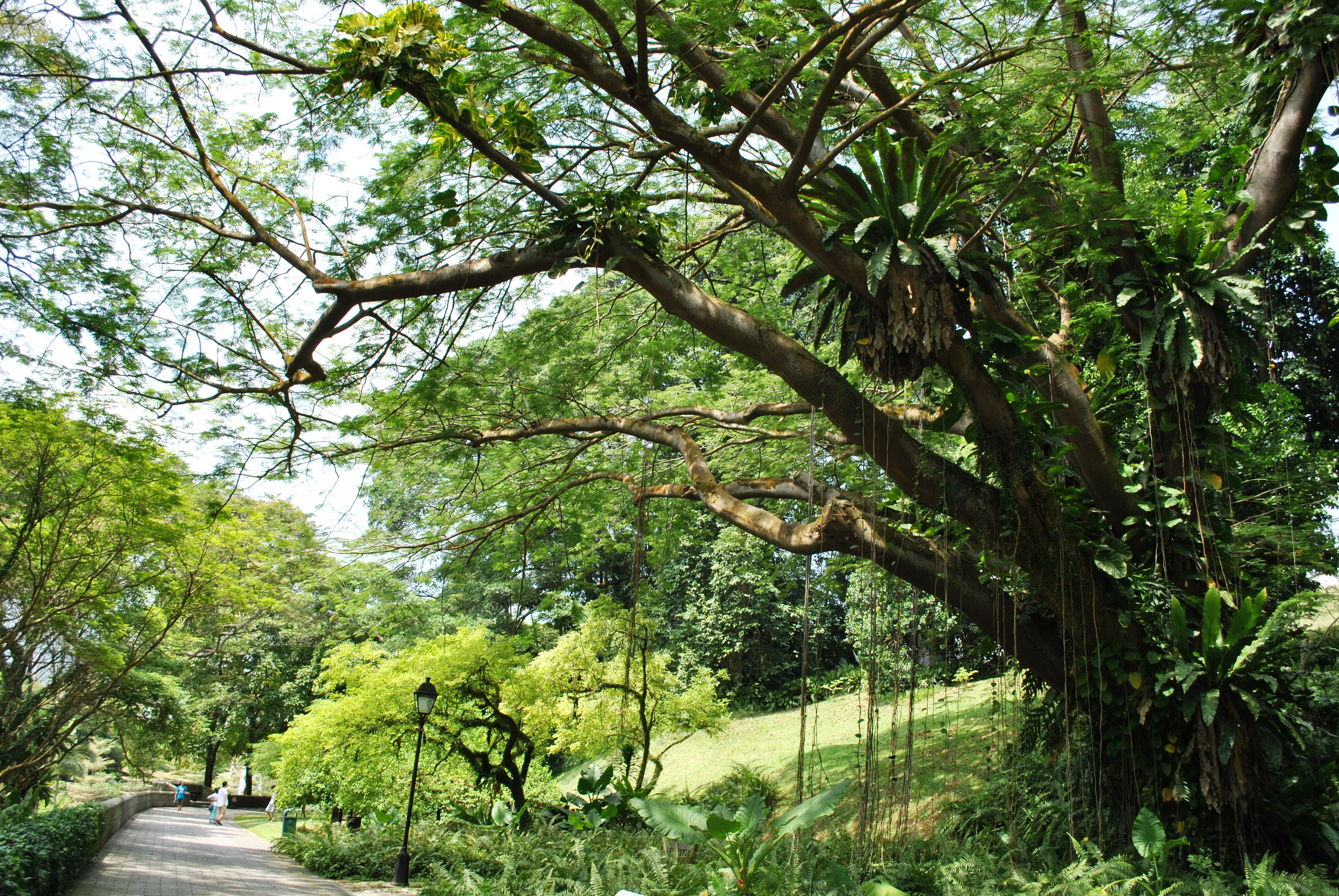
Heritage tree, ear-pod tree (Enterolobium cyclocarpum)

The guanacaste has in the past been referred to by these junior synonyms:

- Albizia longipes Britton & Killip
- Enterolobium cyclocarpa (Jacq.) Griseb. (lapsus)
- Feuilleea cyclocarpa (Jacq.) Kuntze
- Inga cyclocarpa (Jacq.) Willd.

Not to be confused with Inga cyclocarpa Ducke

- Mimosa cyclocarpa Jacq.
- Mimosa parota Sessé & Moc.
- Pithecellobium cyclocarpum (Jacq.) Mart.
- Prosopis dubia Kunth
