= History of the Falkland Islands =

Map of the modern Falkland Islands

The history of the Falkland Islands goes back at least five hundred years, with active exploration and colonisation only taking place in the 18th century. Nonetheless, the Falkland Islands have been a matter of controversy, as they have been claimed by the French, British, Spanish and Argentines at various times.

The islands were uninhabited when discovered by Europeans. France established a colony on the islands in 1764. In 1765, a British captain claimed the islands for Britain. In early 1770 a Spanish commander arrived from Buenos Aires with five ships and 1,400 soldiers forcing the British to leave Port Egmont. Britain and Spain almost went to war over the islands, but the British government decided that it should withdraw its presence from many overseas settlements in 1774. Spain, which had a garrison at Puerto Soledad on East Falkland, administered the garrison from Montevideo until 1811 when it was compelled to withdraw as a result of the war against Argentine independence and the pressures of the Peninsular War. Luis Vernet attempted to establish a settlement in 1826, seeking support from both the Argentine and British Governments but most of his settlers took the opportunity to leave in 1831 following a raid by the USS Lexington. An attempt made by Argentina to establish a penal colony in 1832 failed due to a mutiny. In 1833, the British returned to the Falkland Islands. Argentina invaded the islands on 2 April 1982. The British responded with an expeditionary force that forced the Argentines to surrender.

== Claims of pre-Columbian discovery ==
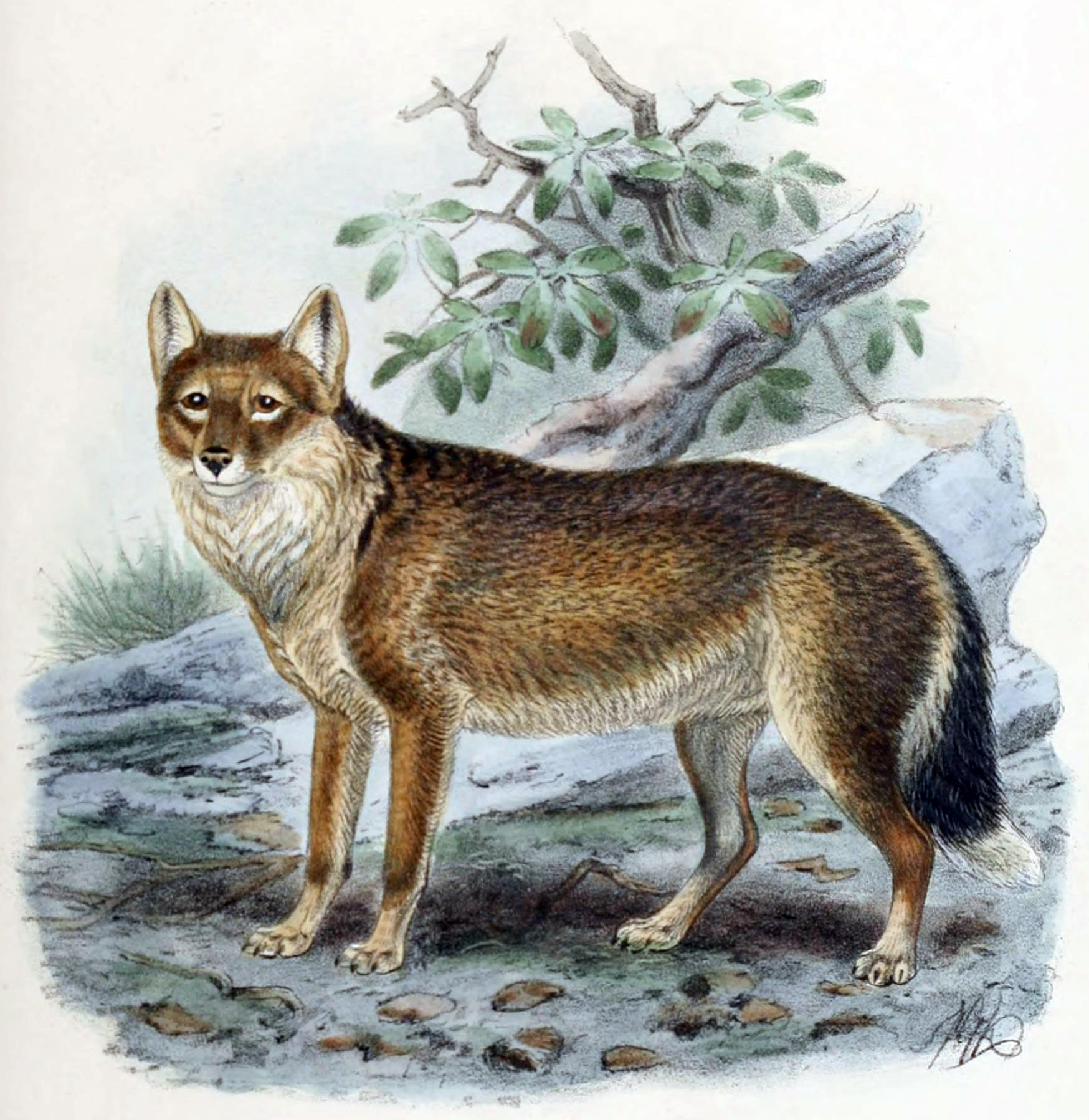
The extinct Falkland Islands wolf or warrah is sometimes taken as evidence of pre-European discovery.

When the world sea level was lower in the Ice Age, the Falkland Islands may have been joined to the mainland of South America.

While Fuegians from Patagonia could have visited the Falklands, the islands were uninhabited when discovered by Europeans. Recent discoveries of arrowheads in Lafonia (on the southern half of East Falkland) as well as the remains of a wooden canoe provide evidence that the Yaghan people of Tierra del Fuego may have made the journey to the islands. It is not known if these are evidence of one-way journeys, but there is no known evidence of pre-Columbian buildings or structures. However, it is not certain that the discovery predates the arrival of Europeans. A Patagonian Missionary Society mission station was founded on Keppel Island (off the west coast of West Falkland) in 1856. Yahgan people were at this station from 1856 to 1898 so this may be the source of the artifacts that have been found. In 2021, a paper was published on deposits of marine animal bones (primarily South American sea lion and Southern rockhopper penguin) on New Island off the coast of West Falkland, at the same site where a quartzite arrowhead made of local stone had been found in 1979. The sites dated to 1275 to 1420 CE, and were interpreted as processing or midden sites where marine animals had been butchered. A charcoal spike consistent with anthropogenic causes (i.e. caused by humans) on New Island was also dated to 550 BP (1400 CE). The Yaghan people were capable seafarers, and are known to have travelled to the Diego Ramírez Islands around 105 km (65 mi) south of Cape Horn, and were suggested to be responsible for the creation of the mounds. Other authors have suggested that the mounds and arrowheads do not provide unambiguous evidence of pre-European presence.

The past presence of the Falkland Islands wolf, Dusicyon australis, has often been cited as evidence of pre-European occupation of the islands, but this is contested. The animal was observed in the Falklands by Charles Darwin, but is now extinct.

The islands had no native trees when discovered but there is some ambiguous evidence of past forestation, which may be due to wood being transported by oceanic currents from Patagonia. All modern trees have been introduced by Europeans.

== European discovery ==
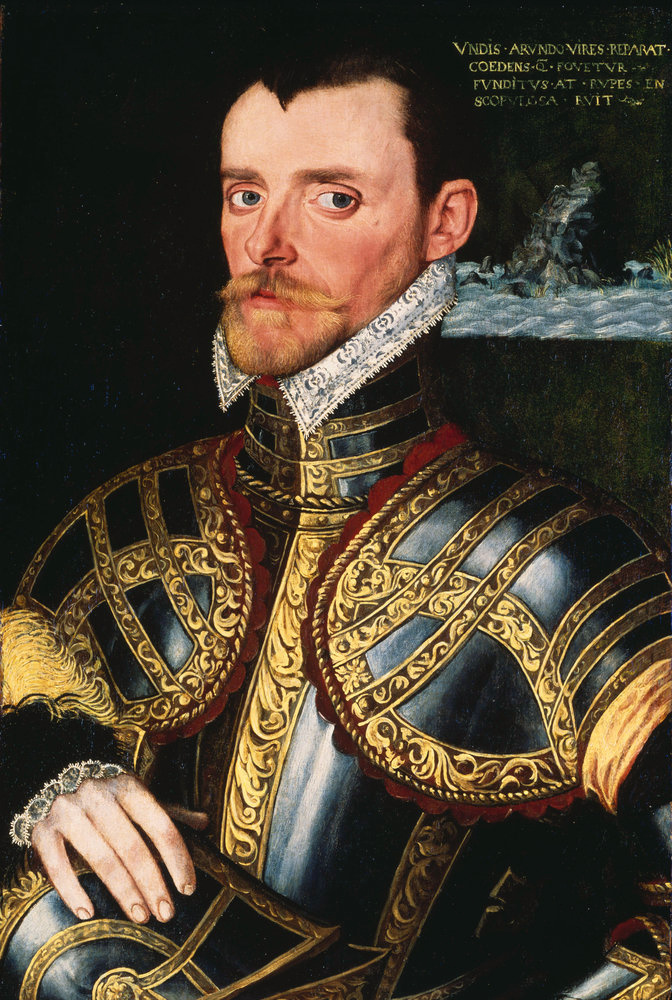
Richard Hawkins

An archipelago in the region of the Falkland Islands appeared on Portuguese maps from the early 16th century. Researchers Pepper and Pascoe cite the possibility that an unknown Portuguese expedition may have sighted the islands, based on the existence of a French copy of a Portuguese map from 1516. Maps from this period show islands known as the Sanson islands in a position that could be interpreted as the Falklands.

Sightings of the islands are attributed to Ferdinand Magellan or Estêvão Gomes of San Antonio, one of the captains in the expedition, as the Falklands fit the description of those visited to gather supplies. The account given by Antonio Pigafetta, the chronicler of Magellan's voyage, contradicts attribution to either Gomes or Magellan, since it describes the position of islands close to the Patagonia coast, with the expedition following the mainland coast and the islands visited between a latitude of 49° and 51°S and also refers to meeting "giants" (described as Sansón or Samsons in the chronicle) who are believed to be the Tehuelche. Although acknowledging that Pigafetta's account casts doubt upon the claim, the Argentine historian Laurio H. Destefani asserts it probable that a ship from the Magellan expedition discovered the islands citing the difficulty in measuring longitude accurately, which means that islands described as close to the coast could be further away. Destefani dismisses attribution to Gomes since the course taken by him on his return would not have taken the ships near the Falklands.

Destefani also attributes an early visit to the Falklands by an unknown Spanish ship, although Destefani's firm conclusions are contradicted by authors who conclude the sightings refer to the Beagle Channel.

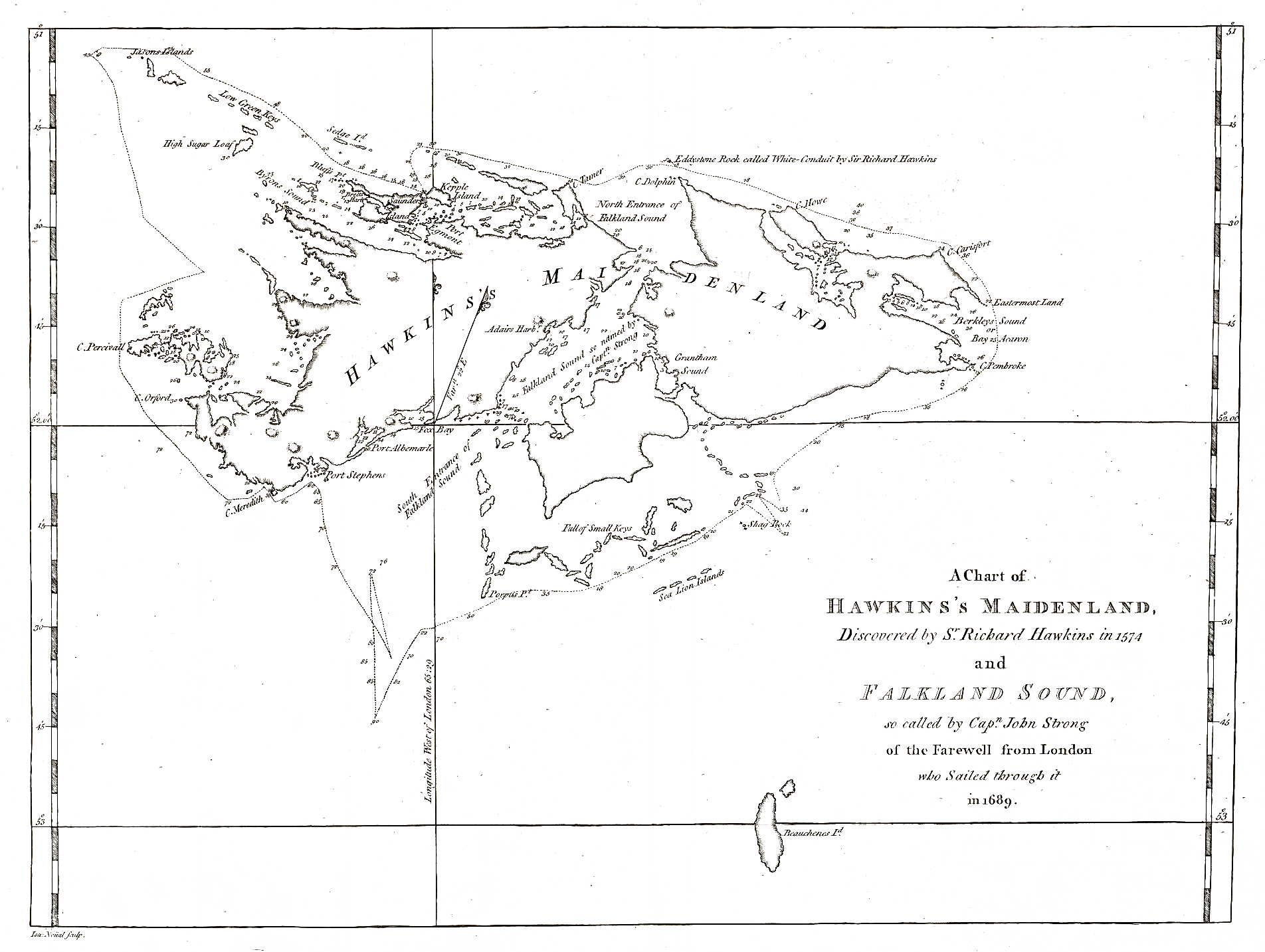
1773 Map by John Hawkesworth and John Byron showing Richard Hawkins' apparent discovery of the Falklands

The name of the archipelago derives from Lord Falkland, the Treasurer of the Admiralty, who organized the first expedition to the South Atlantic with the intention to explore the Islands.

When English explorer John Davis, commander of Desire, one of the ships belonging to Thomas Cavendish's second expedition to the New World, separated from Cavendish off the coast of what is now southern Argentina, he decided to make for the Strait of Magellan in order to find Cavendish. On 9 August 1592 a severe storm battered his ship, and Davis drifted under bare masts, taking refuge "among certain Isles never before discovered". Davis did not provide the latitude of these islands, indicating they were 50 leagues (240 km) away from the Patagonian coast (they are actually 75 leagues, 360 km away). Navigational errors due to the longitude problem were a common problem until the late 18th century, when accurate marine chronometers became readily available, although Destefani asserts the error here to be "unusually large".

In 1594, they may have been visited by English commander Richard Hawkins with his ship the Dainty, who, combining his own name with that of Queen Elizabeth I, the "Virgin Queen", gave a group of islands the name of "Hawkins' Maidenland". However, the latitude given was off by at least 3 degrees and the description of the shore (including the sighting of bonfires) casts doubts on his discovery. Errors in the latitude measured can be attributed to a simple mistake reading a cross staff divided into minutes, meaning the latitude measured could have been 50° 48' S. The description of bonfires can also be attributed to peat fires caused by lightning, which is not uncommon in the outer islands of the Falklands in February. In 1925, Conor O'Brian analysed the voyage of Hawkins and concluded that the only land he could have sighted was Steeple Jason Island. The British historian Mary Cawkell also points out that criticism of the account of Hawkins' discovery should be tempered by the fact it was written nine years after the event; Hawkins was captured by the Spanish and spent eight years in prison.

On 24 January 1600, the Dutchman Sebald de Weert visited the Jason Islands and called them the Sebald Islands (in Spanish, "Islas Sebaldinas" or "Sebaldes"). This name remained in use for the entire Falkland Islands for a long time; William Dampier used the name Sibbel de Wards in his reports of his visits in 1684 and 1703, while James Cook still referred to the Sebaldine Islands in the 1770s. The latitude that De Weert provided (50° 40') was close enough as to be considered, for the first time beyond doubt, the Falkland Islands.

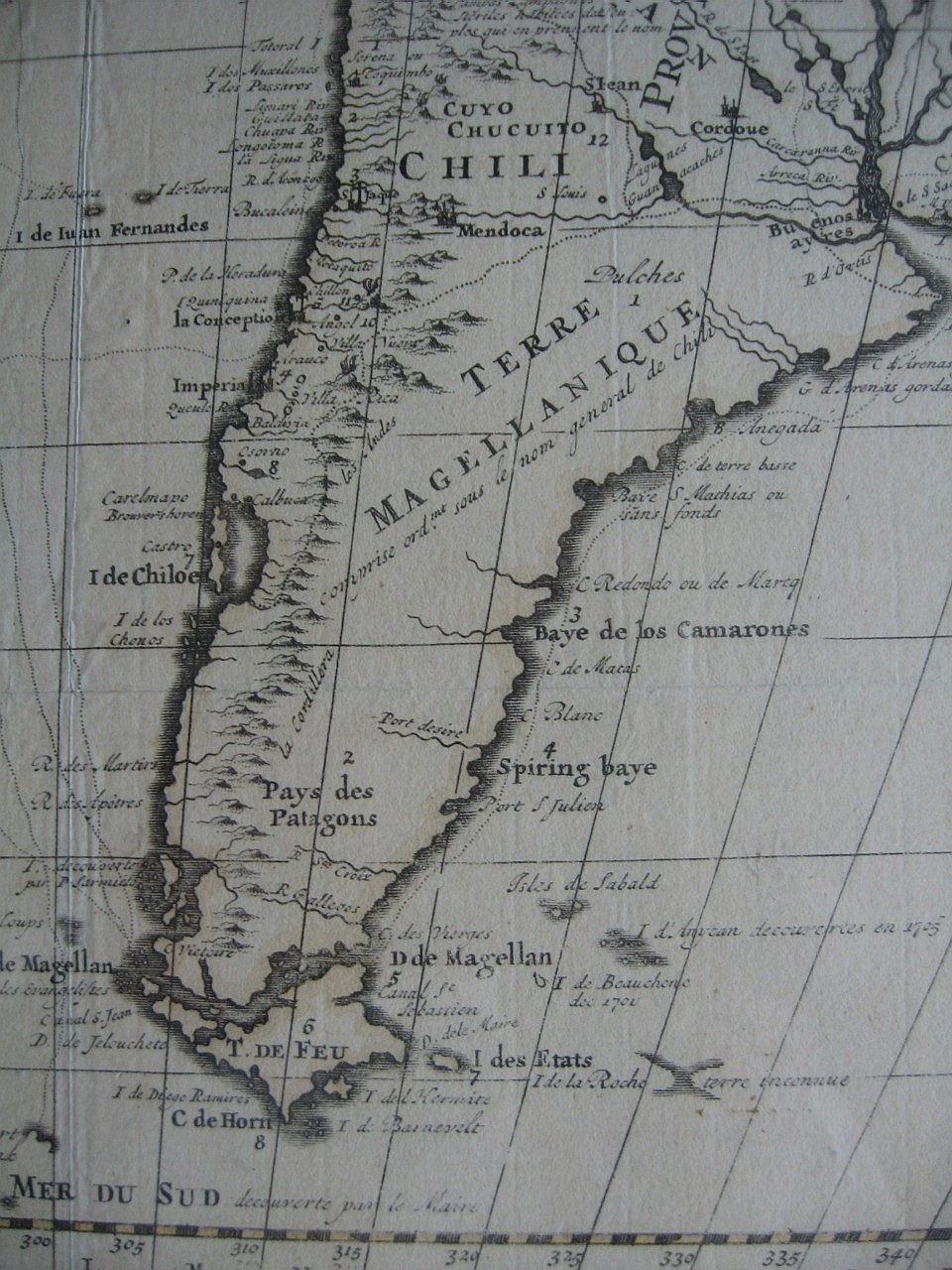
French map, c. 1710, illustrating the fragmentary knowledge about the islands of the South Atlantic at the time. 'Anycan' is most probably a corruption of 'Hawkin's'

English Captain John Strong, commander of Welfare, sailed between the two principal islands in 1690 and called the passage "Falkland Channel" (now Falkland Sound), after Anthony Cary, 5th Viscount Falkland (1656–1694), who as Commissioner of the Admiralty had financed the expedition and later became First Lord of the Admiralty. From this body of water the island group later took its collective name.

== Early colonisation ==
The French explorer Louis Antoine de Bougainville established a colony at Port St. Louis, on East Falkland's Berkeley Sound coast in 1764. The French name Îles Malouines was given to the islands – malouin being the adjective for the Breton port of Saint-Malo. The Spanish name Islas Malvinas is a translation of the French name of Îles Malouines.

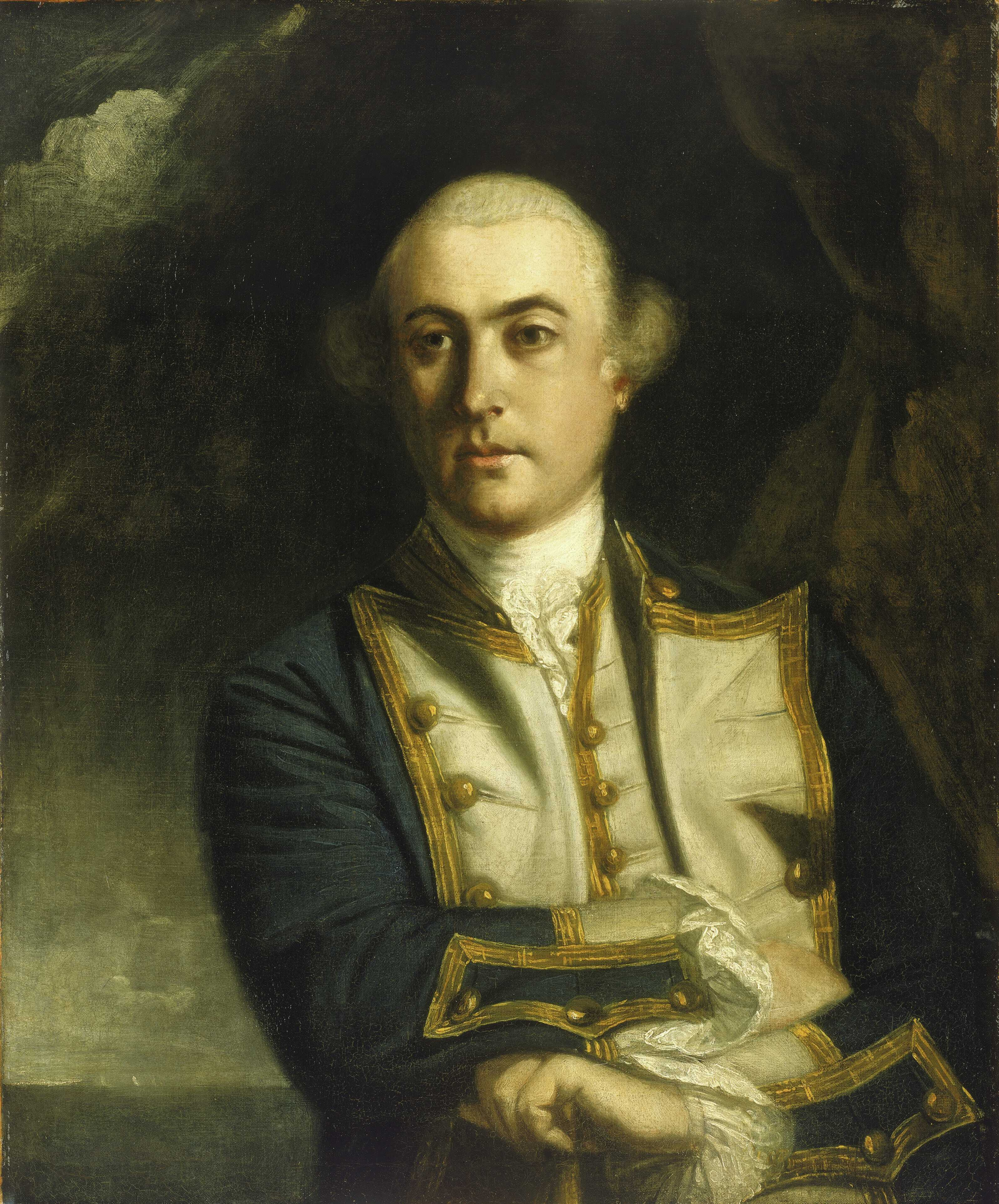
John Byron, by Sir Joshua Reynolds, 1759.

In 1765, Captain John Byron, who was unaware the French had established Port Saint Louis on East Falkland, explored Saunders Island around West Falkland. After discovering a natural harbour, he named the area Port Egmont and claimed the islands for Britain on the grounds of prior discovery. The next year Captain John MacBride established a permanent British settlement at Port Egmont.

Under the alliance established by the Pacte de Famille, in 1766 France agreed to leave after the Spanish complained about French presence in territories they considered their own. Spain agreed to compensate Louis de Bougainville, the French admiral and explorer who had established the settlement on East Falkland at his own expense. In 1767, the Spanish formally assumed control of Port St. Louis and renamed it Puerto Soledad (English: Port Solitude).

In early 1770 Spanish commander, Don Juan Ignacio de Madariaga, briefly visited Port Egmont. On 10 June he returned from Argentina with five armed ships and 1400 soldiers forcing the British to leave Port Egmont. This action sparked the Falkland Crisis between 10 July 1770 to 22 January 1771 when Britain and Spain almost went to war over the islands. However, conflict was averted when the colony was re-established by Captain John Stott with the ships HMS Juno, HMS Hound and HMS Florida (a mail ship which had already been at the founding of the original settlement). Egmont quickly became an important port-of-call for British ships sailing around Cape Horn.

With the growing economic pressures stemming from the upcoming American War of Independence, the British government decided that it should withdraw its presence from many overseas settlements in 1774. On 20 May 1776 the British forces under the command of Royal Naval Lieutenant Clayton formally left Port Egmont, while leaving a plaque asserting Britain's continuing sovereignty over the islands. For the next four years, British sealers used Egmont as a base for their activities in the South Atlantic. This ended in 1780 when they were forced to leave by Spanish authorities who then ordered that the British colony be destroyed.

The Spanish withdrew from the islands under pressure as a result of the Napoleonic invasion and the Argentine War of Independence. The Spanish garrison of Puerto Soledad was removed to Montevideo in 1811 aboard the brigantine Gálvez under an order signed by Francisco Javier de Elío. On departure, the Spanish also left a plaque proclaiming Spain's sovereignty over the islands as the British had done 35 years before. The total depopulation of the Falkland Islands took place.

== Inter-colonial period ==
Following the departure of the Spanish settlers, the Falkland Islands became the domain of whalers and sealers who used the islands to shelter from the worst of the South Atlantic weather. By merit of their location, the Falkland Islands have often been the last refuge for ships damaged at sea. Most numerous among those using the islands were British and American sealers, where typically between 40 and 50 ships were engaged in exploiting fur seals. This represents an itinerant population of up to 1,000 sailors.

=== Isabella ===
On 8 February 1813 Isabella, a British ship of 193 tons en route from Sydney to London, ran aground off the coast of Speedwell Island, then known as Eagle Island. Among the ship's 54 passengers and crew, all of whom survived the wreck, was the United Irish general and exile Joseph Holt, who subsequently detailed the ordeal in his memoirs. Also aboard had been the heavily pregnant Joanna Durie, who on 21 February 1813 gave birth to Elizabeth Providence Durie.

The next day, 22 February 1813, six men set out in one of the Isabella's longboats to seek help from any nearby Spanish outposts. Braving the South Atlantic in a boat little more than 17 feet (5.2 m) long, they made landfall on the mainland at the River Plate just over a month later. The British gun brig HMS Nancy under the command of Lieutenant William D'Aranda was sent to rescue the survivors.

On 5 April Captain Charles Barnard of the American sealer Nanina was sailing off the shore of Speedwell Island, with a discovery boat deployed looking for seals. Having seen smoke and heard gunshots the previous day, he was alert to the possibility of survivors of a ship wreck. This suspicion was heightened when the crew of the boat came aboard and informed Barnard that they had come across a new moccasin as well as the partially butchered remains of a seal. At dinner that evening, the crew observed a man approaching the ship who was shortly joined by eight to ten others. Both Barnard and the survivors from Isabella had harboured concerns the other party was Spanish and were relieved to discover their respective nationalities.

Barnard dined with the Isabella survivors that evening and finding that the British party were unaware of the War of 1812 informed the survivors that technically they were at war with each other. Nevertheless, Barnard promised to rescue the British party and set about preparations for the voyage to the River Plate. Realising that they had insufficient stores for the voyage he set about hunting wild pigs and otherwise acquiring additional food. While Barnard was gathering supplies, however, the British took the opportunity to seize Nanina and departed leaving Barnard, along with one member of his own crew and three from Isabella, marooned. Shortly thereafter, Nancy arrived from the River Plate and encountered Nanina, whereupon Lieutenant D'Aranda rescued the erstwhile survivors of Isabella and took Nanina itself as a prize of war.

Barnard and his party survived for eighteen months marooned on the islands until the British whalers Indispensable and Asp rescued them in November 1814. The British admiral in Rio de Janeiro had requested their masters to divert to the area to search for the American crew. In 1829, Barnard published an account of his survival entitled A Narrative of the Sufferings and Adventures of Capt Charles H. Barnard.

== Argentine colonisation attempts ==
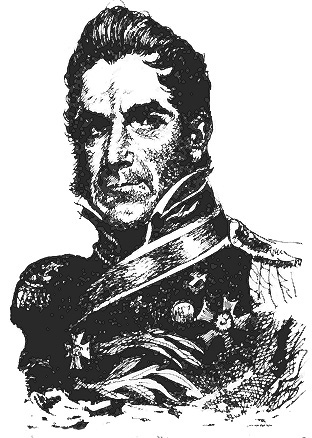
Colonel Jewett

In March 1820, Heroína, a privately owned frigate that was operated as a privateer under a license issued by the United Provinces of the River Plate, under the command of American Colonel David Jewett, set sail looking to capture Spanish ships as prizes. He captured Carlota, a Portuguese ship, which was considered an act of piracy. A storm resulted in severe damage to Heroína and sank the prize Carlota, forcing Jewett to put into Puerto Soledad for repairs in October 1820.

Captain Jewett sought assistance from the British explorer James Weddell. Weddell reported the letter he received from Jewett as:

Sir, I have the honor of informing you that I have arrived in this port with a commission from the Supreme Government of the United Provinces of the Rio de la Plata to take possession of these islands on behalf of the country to which they belong by Natural Law. While carrying out this mission I want to do so with all the courtesy and respect all friendly nations; one of the objectives of my mission is to prevent the destruction of resources necessary for all ships passing by and forced to cast anchor here, as well as to help them to obtain the necessary supplies, with minimum expenses and inconvenience. Since your presence here is not in competition with these purposes and in the belief that a personal meeting will be fruitful for both of us, I invite you to come aboard, where you'll be welcomed to stay as long as you wish; I would also greatly appreciate your extending this invitation to any other British subject found in the vicinity; I am, respectfully yours. Signed, Jewett, Colonel of the Navy of the United Provinces of South America and commander of the frigate Heroína.

Many modern authors report this letter as representing the declaration issued by Jewett.

Jewett's ship received Weddell's assistance in obtaining anchorage off Port Louis. Weddell reported only 30 seamen and 40 soldiers fit for duty out of a crew of 200, and how Jewett slept with pistols over his head following an attempted mutiny earlier in the voyage. On 6 November 1820, Jewett raised the flag of the United Provinces of the River Plate (a predecessor of modern-day Argentina) and claimed possession of the islands. In the words of Weddell, "In a few days, he took formal possession of these islands for the patriot government of Buenos Ayres, read a declaration under their colours, planted on a port in ruins, and fired a salute of twenty-one guns."

Jewett departed from the Falkland Islands in April 1821. In total he had spent no more than six months on the island, entirely at Port Louis. In 1822, Jewett was accused of piracy by a Portuguese court, but by that time he was in Brazil.

=== Luis Vernet's enterprise ===
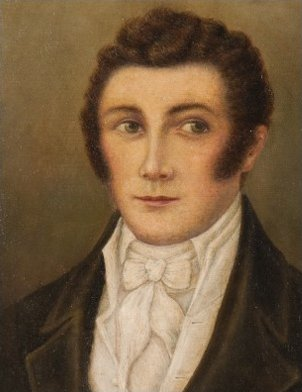
Luis Vernet, 1791–1871

In 1823, the United Provinces of the River Plate granted fishing rights to Jorge Pacheco and Luis Vernet. Travelling to the islands in 1824, the first expedition failed almost as soon as it landed, and Pacheco chose not to continue with the venture. Vernet persisted, but the second attempt, delayed until winter 1826 by a Brazilian blockade, was also unsuccessful. The expedition intended to exploit the feral cattle on the islands but the boggy conditions meant the gauchos could not catch cattle in their traditional way. Vernet was by now aware of conflicting British claims to the islands and sought permission from the British consulate before departing for the islands.

In 1828, the United Provinces government granted Vernet all of East Falkland including all its resources, and exempted him from taxation if a colony could be established within three years. He took settlers, including British Captain Matthew Brisbane (who had sailed to the islands earlier with Weddell), and before leaving once again sought permission from the British Consulate in Buenos Aires. The British asked for a report for the British government on the islands, and Vernet asked for British protection should they return.

On 10 June 1829, Vernet was designated as 'civil and military commandant' of the islands (no governor was ever appointed) and granted a monopoly on seal hunting rights. A protest was lodged by the British Consulate in Buenos Aires. By 1831, the colony was successful enough to be advertising for new colonists, although USS Lexington's report suggests that the conditions on the islands were quite miserable. Charles Darwin's visit in 1833 confirmed the squalid conditions in the settlement, although Captain Matthew Brisbane (Vernet's deputy) later claimed that this was the result of the Lexington raid.

=== USS Lexington raid ===
In 1831, Vernet attempted to assert his monopoly on seal hunting rights. This led him to capture the American ships Harriet, Superior and Breakwater. As a reprisal, the United States consul in Buenos Aires sent Captain Silas Duncan of USS Lexington to recover the confiscated property. After finding what he considered proof that at least four American fishing ships had been captured, plundered, and even outfitted for war, Duncan took seven prisoners aboard Lexington and charged them with piracy.

Also taken on board, Duncan reported, "were the whole of the (Falklands') population consisting of about forty persons, with the exception of some 'gauchos', or cowboys who were encamped in the interior." The group, principally German citizens from Buenos Aires, "appeared greatly rejoiced at the opportunity thus presented of removing with their families from a desolate region where the climate is always cold and cheerless and the soil extremely unproductive". However, about 24 people did remain on the island, mainly gauchos and several Charrúa Indians, who continued to trade on Vernet's account.

Measures were taken against the settlement. The log of Lexington reports destruction of arms and a powder store, while settlers remaining later said that there was great damage to private property. Towards the end of his life, Luis Vernet authorised his sons to claim on his behalf for his losses stemming from the raid. In the case lodged against the US Government for compensation, rejected by the US Government of President Cleveland in 1885, Vernet stated that the settlement was destroyed.

=== Penal colony and mutiny ===
In the aftermath of the Lexington incident, Major Esteban Mestivier was commissioned by the Buenos Aires government to set up a penal colony. He arrived at his destination on 15 November 1832 but his soldiers mutinied and killed him. The mutiny was suppressed by armed sailors from the French whaler Jean Jacques, whilst Mestivier's widow was taken on board the British sealer Rapid. Sarandí returned on 30 December 1832 and Major José María Pinedo took charge of the settlement.

== British return ==
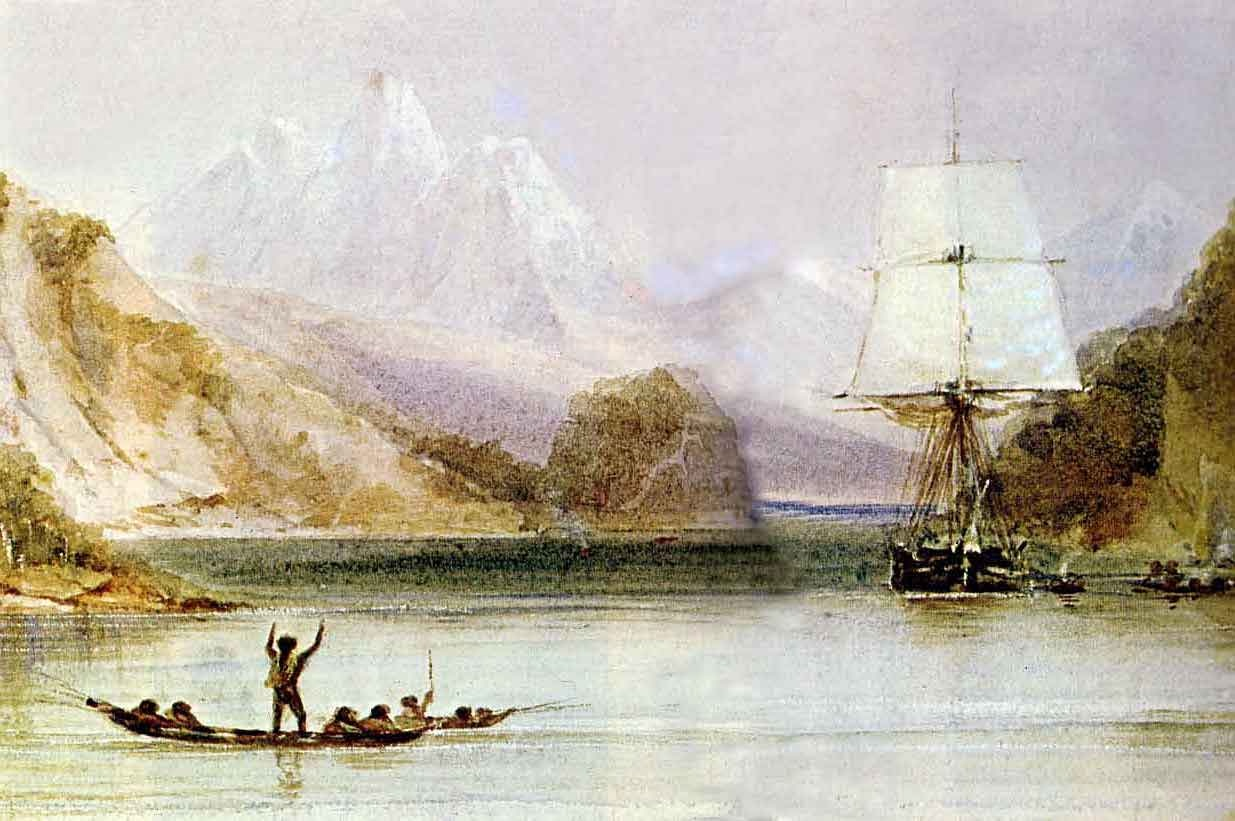
A watercolour by HMS Beagle's draughtsman, Conrad Martens. Painted during the survey of Tierra del Fuego, it depicts Beagle being hailed by native Fuegians. Beagle visited the Falklands in 1834, and a Fuegian "mission" was later planted on Keppel Island in the west of the Falklands

The Argentinian assertions of sovereignty provided the spur for Britain to send a naval task force in order to finally and permanently return to the islands.

On 3 January 1833, Captain James Onslow, of the brig-sloop HMS Clio, arrived at Vernet's settlement at Port Louis to request that the flag of the United Provinces of the Río de la Plata be replaced with the British one, and for the administration to leave the islands. While Major José María Pinedo, commander of the schooner Sarandí, wanted to resist, his numerical disadvantage was obvious, particularly as a large number of his crew were British mercenaries who were unwilling to fight their own countrymen. Such a situation was not unusual in the newly independent states in Latin America, where land forces were strong, but navies were frequently quite undermanned. As such he protested verbally, but departed without a fight on 5 January. Argentina claims that Vernet's colony was also expelled at this time, though sources from the time appear to dispute this, suggesting that the colonists were encouraged to remain initially under the authority of Vernet's storekeeper, William Dickson and later his deputy, Matthew Brisbane.

Initial British plans for the Islands were based upon the continuation of Vernet's settlement at Port Louis. An Argentine immigrant of Irish origin, William Dickson, was appointed as the British representative and provided with a flagpole and flag to be flown whenever ships were in harbour. In March 1833, Vernet's Deputy, Matthew Brisbane returned and presented his papers to Captain Robert FitzRoy of HMS Beagle, which coincidentally happened to be in harbour at the time. Fitzroy encouraged Brisbane to continue with Vernet's enterprise with the proviso that whilst private enterprise was encouraged, Argentine assertions of sovereignty would not be welcome.

Brisbane reasserted his authority over Vernet's settlement and recommenced the practice of paying employees in promissory notes. Due to Vernet's reduced status, the promissory notes were devalued, which meant that the employees received fewer goods at Vernet's stores for their wages. After months of freedom following the Lexington raid this accentuated dissatisfaction with the leadership of the settlement. In August 1833, under the leadership of Antonio Rivero, a gang of Creole and Indian gauchos ran amok in the settlement. Armed with muskets obtained from American sealers, the gang killed five members of Vernet's settlement including both Dickson and Brisbane. Shortly afterward the survivors fled Port Louis, seeking refuge on Turf Island in Berkeley Sound until rescued by the British sealer Hopeful in October 1833.

Lt Henry Smith was installed as the first British resident in January 1834. One of his first actions was to pursue and arrest Rivero's gang for the murders committed the previous August. The gang was sent for trial in London but could not be tried as the Crown Court did not have jurisdiction over the Falkland Islands. In the British colonial system, colonies had their own, distinct governments, finances, and judicial systems. Rivero was not tried and sentenced because the British local government and local judiciary had not yet been installed in 1834; these were created later, by the 1841 British Letters Patent. Subsequently, Rivero has acquired the status of a folk hero in Argentina, where he is portrayed as leading a rebellion against British rule. Ironically it was the actions of Rivero that were responsible for the ultimate demise of Vernet's enterprise on the Falklands.

Charles Darwin revisited the Falklands in 1834; the settlements Darwin and Fitzroy both take their names from this visit.

After the arrest of Rivero, Smith set about restoring the settlement at Port Louis, repairing the damage done by the Lexington raid and renaming it 'Anson's Harbour'. Lt Lowcay succeeded Smith in April 1838, followed by Lt Robinson in September 1839 and Lt Tyssen in December 1839.

Vernet later attempted to return to the Islands but was refused permission to return. The British Crown reneged on promises and refused to recognise rights granted by Captain Onslow at the time of the reoccupation. Eventually, after travelling to London, Vernet received paltry compensation for horses shipped to Port Louis many years before. G.T. Whittington obtained a concession of 6,400 acres (26 km^{2}) from Vernet that he later exploited with the formation of the Falkland Islands Commercial Fishery and Agricultural Association.

== British colonisation ==
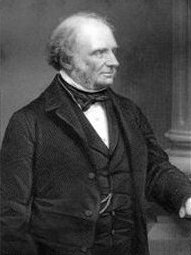
John Russell, 1st Earl Russell, (18 August 1792 – 28 May 1878)

Immediately following their return to the Falkland Islands and the failure of Vernet's settlement, the British maintained Port Louis as a military outpost. There was no attempt to colonise the islands following the intervention, instead there was a reliance upon the remaining rump of Vernet's settlement. Lt. Smith received little support from the Royal Navy and the islands developed largely on his initiative but he had to rely on a group of armed gauchos to enforce authority and protect British interests. Smith received advice from Vernet in this regard, and in turn continued to administer Vernet's property and provide him with regular accounts. His superiors later rebuked him for his ideas and actions in promoting the development of the small settlement in Port Louis. In frustration, Smith resigned but his successors Lt. Lowcay and Lt. Tyssen did not continue with the initiatives Smith had pursued and the settlement began to stagnate.

In 1836, East Falkland was surveyed by Admiral George Grey, and further in 1837 by Lowcay. Admiral George Grey, conducting the geographic survey in November 1836 had the following to say about their first view of East Falkland:

We anchored a little after sunset off a creek called 'Johnson's Harbour'. The day having been cloudy with occasional showers, these islands at all times dreary enough, looked particularly so on our first view of them, the shores of sound, steep, with bare hills intersected with ravines rising from them, these hills without a tree and the clouds hanging low, gave them exactly the appearance of the Cheviots or a Scotch moor on a winter's day and considering we were in the May of these latitudes, the first impression of the climate was not favourable, the weather however, was not called, the thermometer was 63 °F (17 °C) [17 °C] which is Howick mid-summer temperature.

Pressure to develop the islands as a colony began to build as the result of a campaign mounted by British merchant G. T. Whittington. Whittington formed the Falkland Islands Commercial Fishery and Agricultural Association and (based on information indirectly obtained from Vernet) published a pamphlet entitled "The Falkland Islands". Later a petition signed by London merchants was presented to the British Government demanding the convening of a public meeting to discuss the future development of the Falkland Islands. Whittington petitioned the Colonial Secretary, Lord Russell, proposing that his association be allowed to colonise the islands. In May 1840, the British Government made the decision to colonise the Falkland Islands.

Unaware of the decision by the British Government to colonise the islands, Whittington grew impatient and decided to take action of his own initiative. Obtaining two ships, he sent his brother, J. B. Whittington, on a mission to land stores and settlers at Port Louis. On arrival he presented his claim to land that his brother had bought from Vernet. Lt. Tyssen was taken aback by Whittington's arrival, indicating that he had no authority to allow this; however, he was unable to prevent the party from landing. Whittington constructed a large house for his party, and using a salting house built by Vernet established a fish-salting business.

=== Establishment of Port Stanley ===
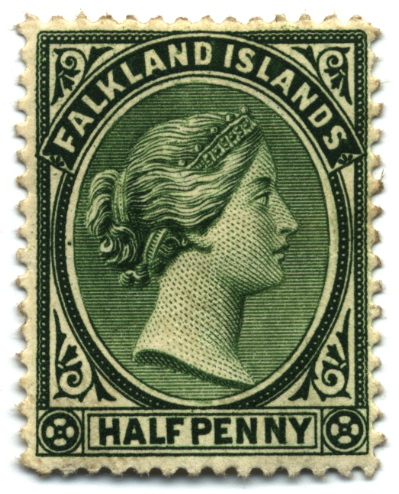
Halfpenny postage stamp, issued 1891, bearing the head of Queen Victoria

In 1833 the United Kingdom asserted authority over the Falkland Islands and Richard Clement Moody, a highly esteemed Royal Engineer, was appointed as Lieutenant Governor of the islands. This post was renamed Governor of the Falkland Islands in 1843, when he also became Commander-in-Chief of the Falkland Islands. Moody left England for Falkland on 1 October 1841 aboard the ship Hebe and arrived in Anson's Harbour later that month. He was accompanied by twelve sappers and miners and their families; together with Whittington's colonists this brought the population of Anson's Harbour to approximately 50. When Moody arrived, the Falklands was 'almost in a state of anarchy', but he used his powers 'with great wisdom and moderation' to develop the Islands' infrastructure and, commanding detachment of sappers, erected government offices, a school and barracks, residences, ports, and a new road system.

In 1842, Moody was instructed by Lord Stanley the British Secretary of State for War and the Colonies to report on the potential of the Port William area as the site of the new capital. Moody assigned the task of surveying the area to Captain Ross, leader of the Antarctic Expedition. Captain Ross delivered his report in 1843, concluding that Port William afforded a good deep-water anchorage for naval vessels, and that the southern shores of Port Jackson was a suitable location for the proposed settlement. Moody accepted the recommendation of Ross and construction of the new settlement started in July 1843. In July 1845, at Moody's suggestion, the new capital of the islands was officially named Port Stanley after Lord Stanley. Not everyone was enthused with the selection of the location of the new capital, J. B. Whittington famously remarked that "Of all the miserable bog holes, I believe that Mr Moody has selected one of the worst for the site of his town."

The structure of the Colonial Government was established in 1845 with the formation of the Legislative Council and Executive Council and work on the construction of Government House commenced. The following year, the first officers appointed to the Colonial Government took their posts; by this time a number of residences, a large storage shed, carpenter's shop and blacksmith's shop had been completed and the Government Dockyard laid out. In 1845 Moody introduced tussock grass into Great Britain from Falkland, for which he received the gold medal of the Royal Agricultural Society. The Coat of arms of the Falkland Islands notably includes an image of tussock grass. Moody returned to England in February 1849. Moody Brook is named after him.

With the establishment of the deep-water anchorage and improvements in port facilities, Stanley saw a dramatic increase in the number of visiting ships in the 1840s in part due to the California gold rush. A boom in ship provisioning and ship-repair resulted, aided by the notoriously bad weather in the South Atlantic and around Cape Horn. Stanley and the Falkland Islands are famous as the repository of many wrecks of 19th-century ships that reached the islands only to be condemned as unseaworthy and were often employed as floating warehouses by local merchants.

At one point in the 19th century, Stanley became one of the world's busiest ports. However, the ship-repair trade began to slacken off in 1876 with the establishment of the Plimsoll line, which saw the elimination of the so-called coffin ships and unseaworthy vessels that might otherwise have ended up in Stanley for repair. With the introduction of increasingly reliable iron steamships in the 1890s the trade declined further and was no longer viable following the opening of the Panama Canal in 1914. Port Stanley continued to be a busy port supporting whaling and sealing activities in the early part of the 20th century, British warships (and garrisons) in the First and Second World War and the fishing and cruise ship industries in the latter half of the century.

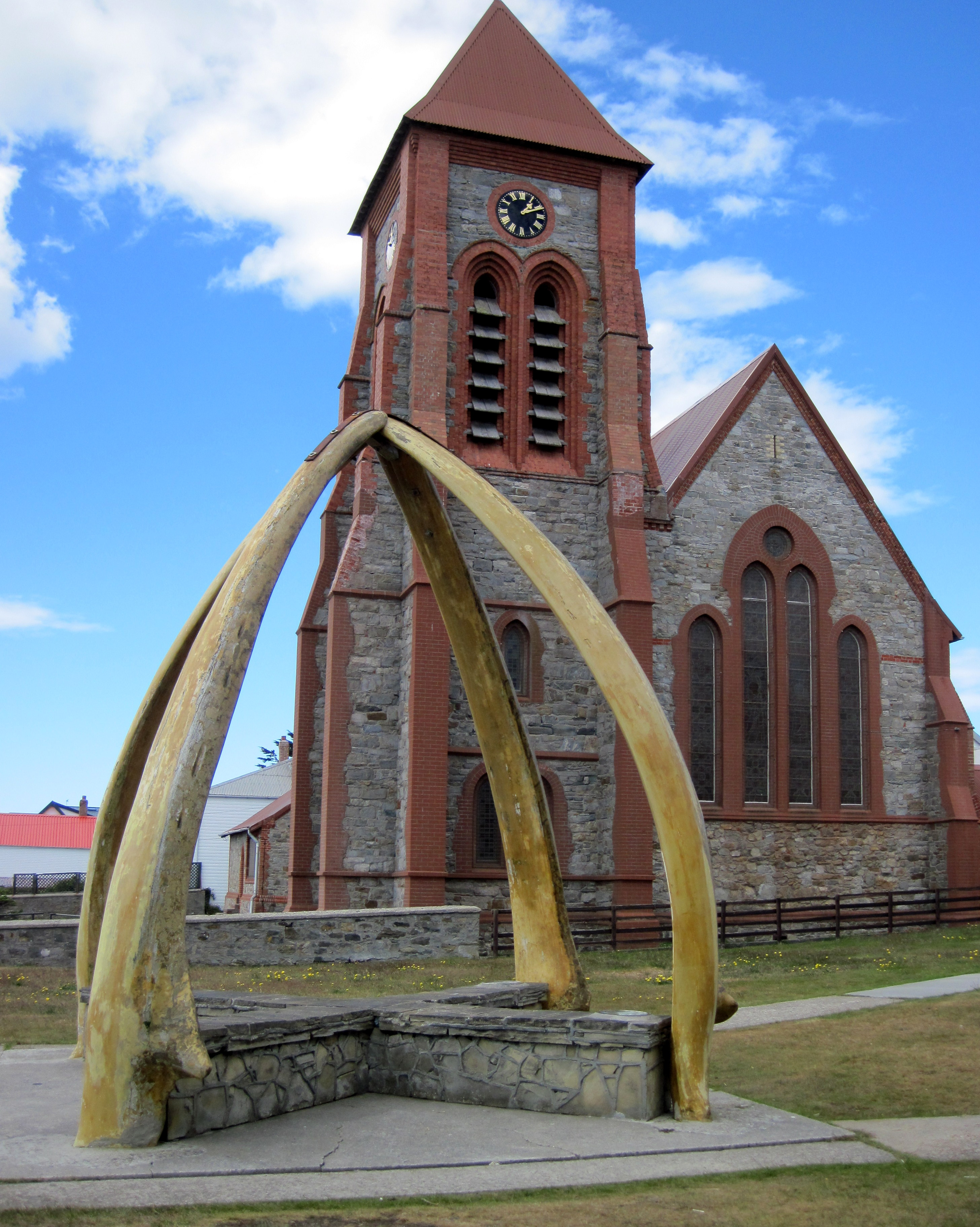
Christ Church Cathedral in Stanley with Whalebone Arch

Government House opened as the offices of the Lieutenant Governor in 1847. Government House continued to develop with various additions, formally becoming the Governor's residence in 1859 when Governor Moore took residence. Government House remains the residence of the Governor.

Many of the colonists begin to move from Ansons' Harbour to Port Stanley. As the new town expanded, the population grew rapidly, reaching 200 by 1849. The population was further expanded by the arrival of 30 married Chelsea Pensioners and their families. The Royal Falkland Islands Police were established in November 1846 with the appointment of Francis Parry as Chief Constable. The force was initially staffed by three officers – the Chief Constable, the Gaoler (responsible for prisoners), and the Night Constable (responsible for policing during the night). The Constables Ordinance 1846, which had been enacted by the colony's Legislative Council on 27 October of that year. The Chelsea Pensioners were to form the permanent garrison and police force, taking over from the Royal Sappers and Miners Regiment which had garrisoned the early colony.

The Exchange Building opened in 1854; part of the building was later used as a church. 1854 also saw the establishment of Marmont Row, including the Eagle Inn, now known as the Upland Goose Hotel. In 1887, Jubilee Villas were built to celebrate the Golden Jubilee of Queen Victoria. Jubilee Villas are a row of brick built houses that follow a traditional British pattern; positioned on Ross road near the waterfront, they became an iconic image during the Falklands War.

Peat is common on the islands and has traditionally been exploited as a fuel. Uncontrolled exploitation of this natural resource led to peat slips in 1878 and 1886. The 1878 peat slip resulted in the destruction of several houses, whilst the 1886 peat slip resulted in the deaths of two women and the destruction of the Exchange Building.

Christ Church Cathedral was consecrated in 1892 and completed in 1903. It received its famous whalebone arch, constructed from the jaws of two blue whales, in 1933 to commemorate the centenary of continuous British administration. Also consecrated in 1892 was the Tabernacle United Free Church, constructed from an imported timber kit.

=== Development ===
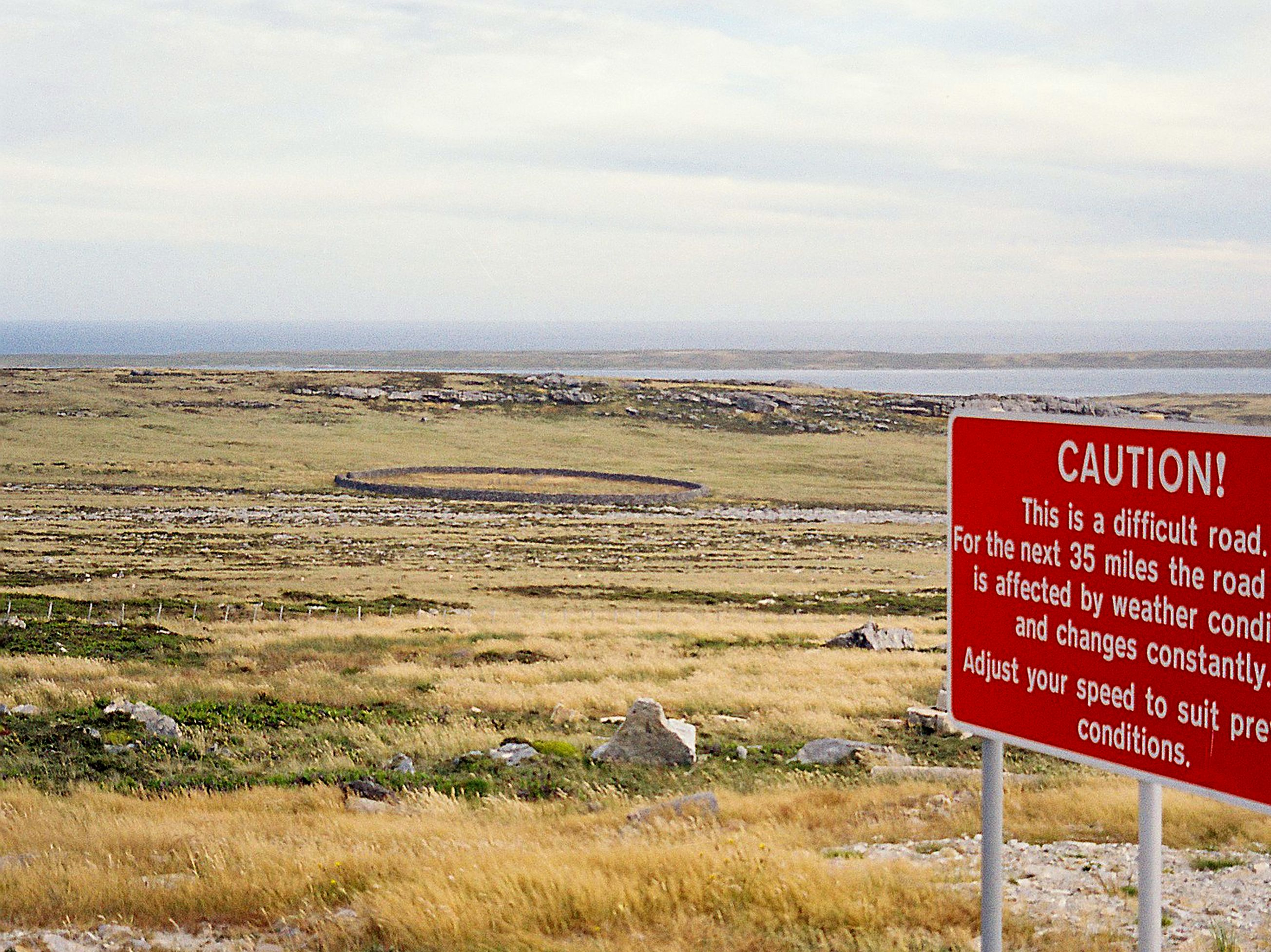
One of the remaining historic corrals at Sapper Hill, near Stanley.

A few years after the British had established themselves in the islands, a number of new British settlements were started. Initially many of these settlements were established in order to exploit the feral cattle on the islands. Following the introduction of the Cheviot breed of sheep to the islands in 1852, sheep farming became the dominant form of agriculture on the Islands.

Salvador Settlement was one of the earliest, being started in the 1830s, by a Gibraltarian immigrant (hence its other name of "Gibraltar Settlement"), and it is still run by his descendants, the Pitalugas.

Cattle were concentrated in the southern part of East Falkland, an area that became known as Lafonia. Lafone was an absentee landlord and never actually set foot on the islands. His activities were not monitored by the British and rather than introducing more British settlers as he promised, he brought large numbers of Spanish and Indian gauchos to hunt cattle. In 1846, they established Hope Place on the south shores of Brenton Loch. Vernet furnished Samuel Fisher Lafone, a British merchant operating from Montevideo, with details of the Falkland Islands including a map. Sensing that the exploitation of feral cattle on the islands would be a lucrative venture, in 1846 he negotiated a contract with the British Government that gave him exclusive rights to this resource. Until 1846 Moody had allotted feral cattle to new settlers and the new agreement not only prevented this but made Stanley dependent upon Lafone for supplies of beef. In 1849 a sod wall (the Boca wall) was built across the isthmus at Darwin to control the movement of cattle.

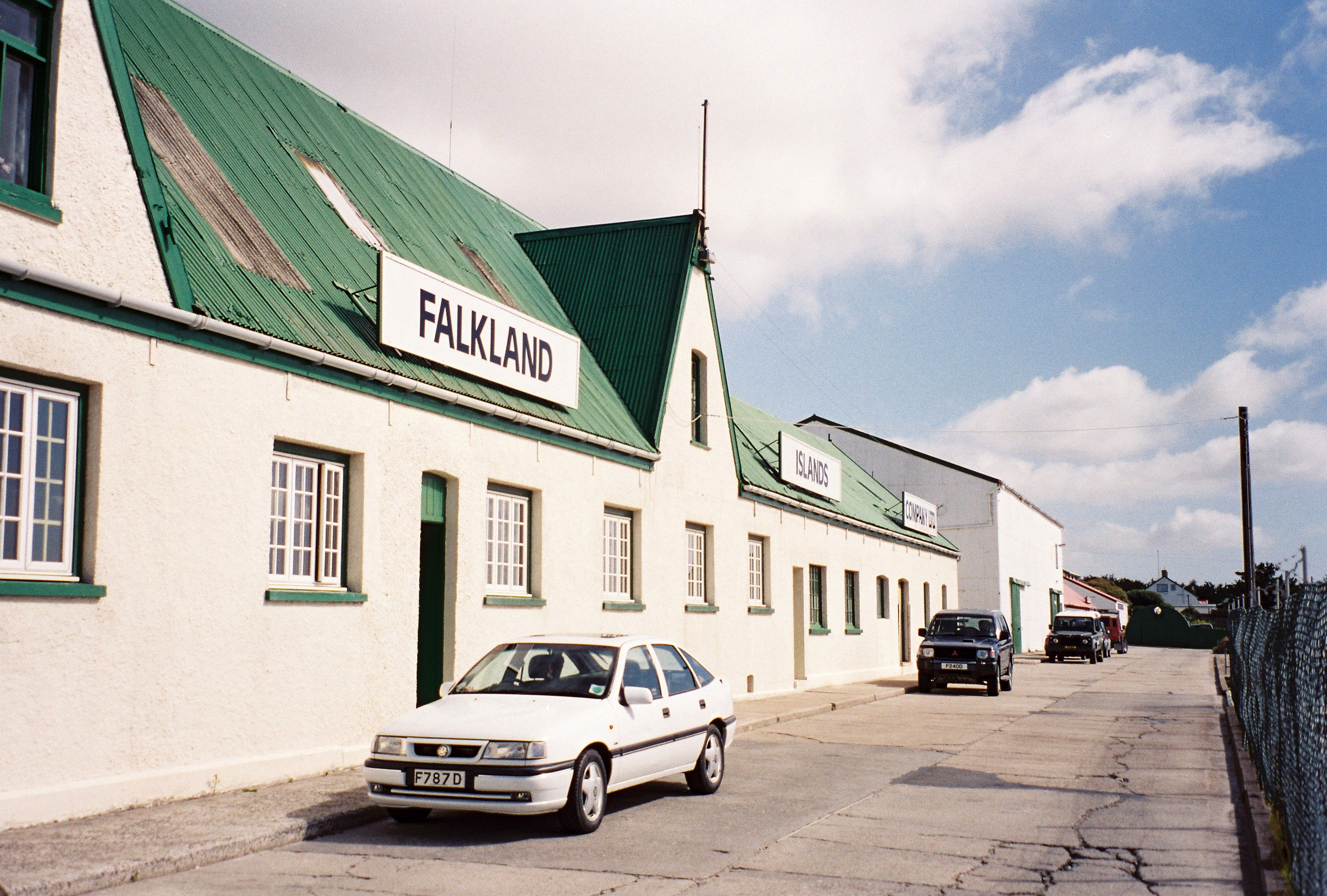
Falkland Islands Company's historical building in Stanley

Lafone continued to develop his business interests and in 1849 looked to establish a joint stock company with his London creditors. The company was launched as The Royal Falkland Land, Cattle, Seal and Fishery Company in 1850 but soon thereafter was incorporated under royal charter as The Falkland Islands Company Limited. Lafone became a director and his brother-in-law J.P. Dale the company's first manager in the islands. By 1852, the feral cattle had been hunted virtually to extinction by gauchos and the company switched to sheep farming with the introduction of the Cheviot breed of sheep. Hope Place proved to be an unsuitable location and the operation moved to Darwin. In 1860, the Lafone Beef contract was terminated but the Falkland Islands Company was given a grant to Lafonia. Ownership of the remaining cattle outside of Lafonia reverted to the Crown and hunting cattle without permission was banned.

In the second half of the 19th century, Darwin, Goose Green, Fox Bay and Port Howard were established. Port Howard was founded by James Lovegrove Waldron, and his brother in 1866; the Waldron brothers later left for Patagonia, but left the farm under local management.

Darwin was initially the haunt of gauchos and cattle farmers, but sheep farming came to dominate the area, and Scottish shepherds were brought in. A few years later, the first large tallow works in the islands (though not the first) was set up by the FIC in 1874. It handled 15,891 sheep in 1880.

From the 1880s, until 1972, Darwin and Fox Bay had their own separate medical officers. Nowadays, most medical care is based in Stanley.

=== Exploitation of maritime resources ===
The Falkland Islands were used as a base for whaling ships hunting the southern right whale and sperm whale from the 1770s until British authority was established over the islands and surrounding seas. Whaling was briefly revived with the establishment of a whaling station on New Island from 1909 to 1917 until whaling operations moved to South Georgia.

Fur seals had long been exploited for their pelts but numbers entered a drastic decline in the early 19th century. As a result, seal hunting died off, although continuing at a low level. In order to conserve stocks, a ban on the hunting of fur seals during summer months was enacted in 1881, but it was not until 1921 that hunting was banned entirely.

Elephant seals were exploited for oil but like the fur seals their numbers declined drastically in the mid-1850s. Sealers instead turned their attention to the South American sea lion resulting in a dramatic decline in their numbers that made sealing uneconomic. Attempts to revive the trade, including a sealing station at Port Albemarle, were unsuccessful.

Even penguins were exploited for oil. Rockhopper and gentoo penguins were rendered down in trypots from 1860 until the 1880s.

== Twentieth century ==
=== Establishment of communications ===
Although the first telephone lines were installed by the Falkland Islands Company in the 1880s, the Falkland Islands Government was slow to embrace telephony. It was not until 1897 that a telephone line was installed between Cape Pembroke lighthouse and the police station. The islands isolation was broken in 1911 when Guglielmo Marconi installed a wireless telegraphy station that enabled telegrams to be sent to mainland Uruguay.

A line was laid between Darwin and Stanley, with the ship Consort landing poles on the coast. Construction commenced in 1906 and was finished in 1907 (a length of nearly 50 miles or 80 kilometres). The line was initially only for business but the public could make calls occasionally. Lines continued to be laid to most of the major settlements in the islands, with the Falkland Islands police responsible for their maintenance until 1927. Communications among the settlements relied on the telephone network until radio telephones were introduced in the 1950s, although the telephone network continued until 1982. Telecommunications improved dramatically after the Falklands War, when an earth station was installed to allow direct dialling for the first time. In 1997, an Internet service was launched and by 2002 nearly 90% of Falkland homes had Internet access.

=== Economic development ===
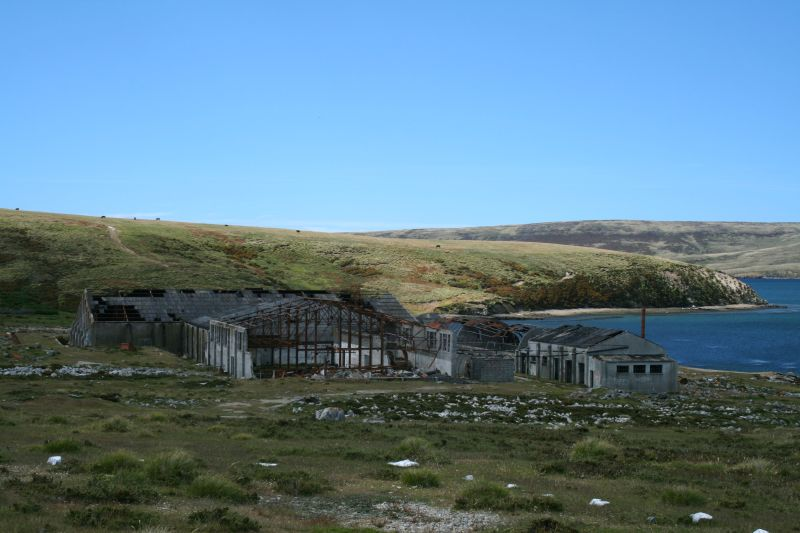
The freezer plant at Ajax Bay. Most of the workers' cottages were moved to Stanley

In 1911 the islands had 3,275 inhabitants of whom 916 lived in Port Stanley. A canning factory was opened in 1911 at Goose Green and was initially extremely successful. It absorbed a large proportion of surplus sheep but during the postwar slump it suffered a serious loss and closed in 1921.

Despite this setback, a mere year later, the settlement grew after it became the base for the Falkland Islands Company's sheep farm in Lafonia in 1922, with improved sheep handling and wool shed being built. In 1927, the settlement's huge sheep shearing shed was built, which is claimed to be the world's largest, with a capacity of five thousand sheep. In 1979, 100,598 sheep were shorn at Goose Green.

The mid-20th century saw a number of abortive attempts to diversify the islands' economy away from large scale sheep ranching.

In the period just after the Second World War, Port Albemarle, in the south west of West Falkland, was enlarged by the Colonial Development Company and included its own power station, jetty, Nissen huts etc.; this was an attempt to revive the old sealing industry which had flourished during the 19th century. However, the project proved to be nonviable, not least because seal numbers had declined massively.

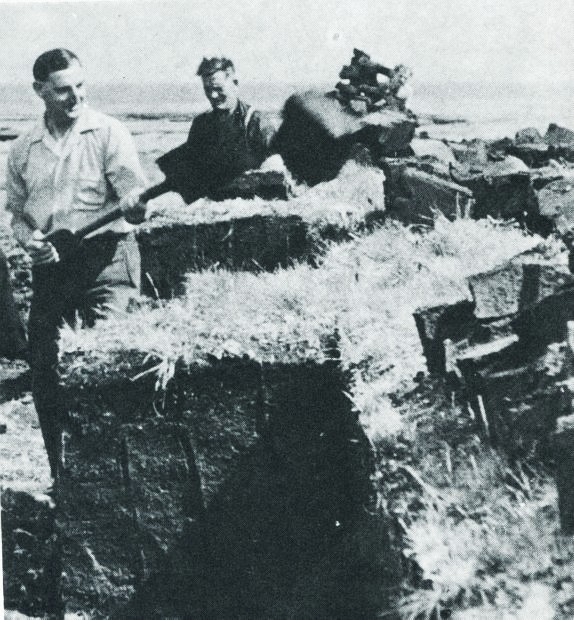
Islanders shovelling peat (1950s)

Similarly, Ajax Bay on Falkland Sound, was developed by the Colonial Development Corporation in the 1950s, which was also responsible for developing Port Albemarle. It was mainly a refrigeration plant, and was supposed to freeze Falkland mutton, but this was found to be economically nonviable, despite the huge expense incurred. Many of the pre-fabricated houses here were moved to Stanley. The site later became a British field hospital during the landings of Operation Sutton.

The seas around the Falkland Islands were not well policed prior to the Falklands War, and many foreign boats fished off the islands, despite protests that potential revenue was being lost. Fishing licences were only later to be introduced.

=== Education ===
In 1956, J. L. Waldron Ltd built a school at Port Howard, possibly inspired by the "gift" of the FIC at Darwin, a few years earlier.

Up until the 1970s, Goose Green was the site of a boarding school, run by the state. "Camp" children boarded here, and there were 40 spaces. The boarding school was later transferred to Stanley, although the recent emphasis has been on locally based education. The school itself became an Argentine HQ, and was burnt down. A new (day) school has been built for local children.

=== First World War ===
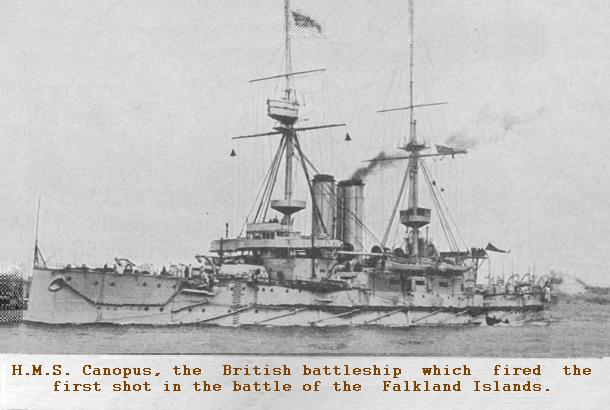
HMS Canopus. Canopus Hill in the Falkland Islands commemorates her role in the Battle of the Falkland Islands.

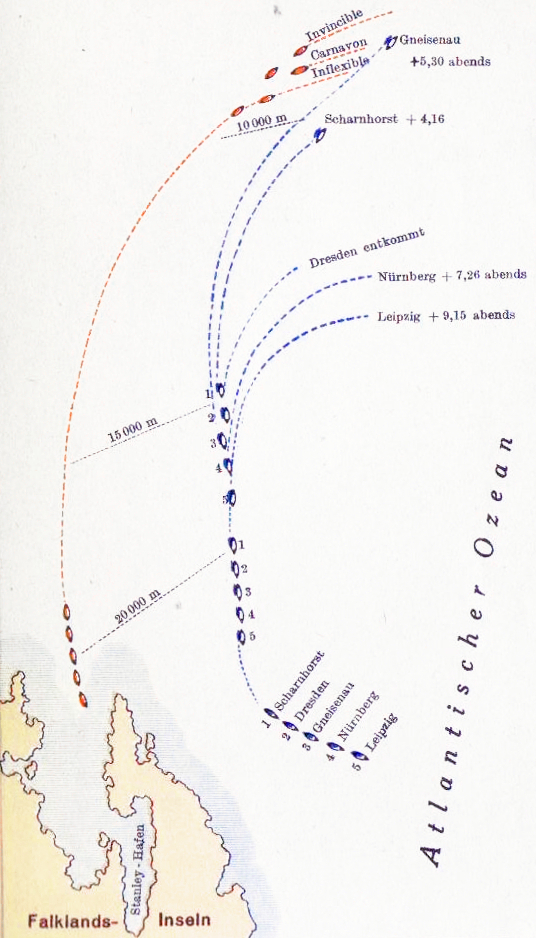
The Battle of the Falkland Islands, 8 December 1914. The German armoured cruisers under Admiral von Spee that had been raiding British sealanes were sunk by a British battlecruiser task force.

Port Stanley became an important coaling station for the Royal Navy. This led to ships based there being involved in major naval engagements in both the First and Second World Wars.

The strategic significance of the Falkland Islands was confirmed by the second major naval engagement of the First World War. Admiral Graf Maximilian von Spee's East Asia Squadron called at the islands on its trip from the Pacific Ocean back to Germany, intending to destroy the Royal Navy radio relay station and coaling depot there. Unknown to von Spee, a British squadron, including two battlecruisers considerably more powerful than his forces, had been sent to hunt down his squadron and happened to be in the harbour coaling. In the one-sided battle which followed, most of von Spee's squadron was sunk. Canopus Hill, south of Stanley, is named after HMS Canopus, which had fired the first shot in the battle.

=== Second World War ===
The Falkland Islands Defence Force was called out to man gun positions and signalling posts around Stanley as soon as word was received of Britain's declaration of war on 3 September 1939. Mounted patrols were carried out in the Camp, and coast-watching stations were created around the islands to guard against the approach of enemy ships and the landing of enemy forces. The Falkland Islanders experienced much the same kind of war-time privations and restrictions as the British population, including black-outs, travel restrictions, and rationing.

In December 1939, in the immediate aftermath of the Battle of the River Plate, County-class heavy cruiser HMS Cumberland, which had been self-refitting in the Falkland Islands at the time of the battle, steamed to join HMS Ajax and HMS Achilles at the mouth of the River Plate, trapping the German cruiser Admiral Graf Spee. Convinced by British propaganda and false intelligence that a major naval task force awaited his ship and short of ammunition, Captain Langsdorff of Admiral Graf Spee chose instead to scuttle the ship rather than face the Royal Navy.

Operation Tabarin, an expedition to the Antarctic, was mounted from the islands during the war. The purpose of the expedition was to assert Britain's claims on the continent, as well as gather scientific data. Operation Tabarin was later replaced by the Falkland Islands Dependencies Survey, which was later renamed the British Antarctic Survey.

In 1942, in response to the Japanese entry into the war, additional forces were sent to the islands to strengthen their defence against invasion. The largest component of these additional forces was a battalion of the West Yorkshire Regiment. In 1944, as a result of the reduced threat of invasion from Japan, the West Yorks were replaced by a smaller contingent of the Royal Scots.

Over the whole war more than 150 Falkland Islanders out of a population of only 2,300 volunteered for the British armed forces - 6.5% of the entire population - 24 of whom did not return. In July 1944, all volunteers were given the right to be identified by a "Falkland Islands" shoulder-flash. In addition to these contributions to the British war-effort, the Falkland Islands also donated five Supermarine Spitfires to the British Royal Air Force.

=== Argentine incursions ===
With the exception of an attempt by President Juan Perón to buy the Falkland Islands in 1953 which was rejected as inconceivable by the British government, the immediate post-war period was fairly uneventful. However, a series of incidents in the 1960s marked the intensification of Argentine sovereignty claims.

The first of these took place in 1964, when a light plane piloted by Miguel Fitzgerald touched down on the racecourse at Stanley. Leaping from the aircraft, he handed a letter claiming sovereignty to a bemused islander before flying off again. The stunt was timed to coincide with Argentine diplomatic efforts at the UN Decolonisation Committee.

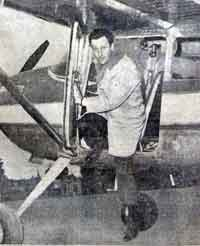
Miguel L. Fitzgerald flew to the Falkland Islands in a light aircraft in 1964 and 1968. (Originally published by Crónica, 9 September 1964.)

A more serious incident took place on 28 September 1966 when eighteen young Peronists staged a symbolic invasion of the Islands by hijacking an Aerolíneas Argentinas airliner and landing it in Stanley; the group called this action Operativo Cóndor. There, they raised seven Argentine flags and took four islanders hostage. The planning had been done during a trip to the islands that one of the leaders had made as a tourist. The airliner left at from Buenos Aires, bound for Río Gallegos with 48 passengers on board, including Argentine Rear Admiral José María Guzmán, who was on his way to Tierra del Fuego, an Argentine territory of which he was governor. Two armed men entered the flight deck and ordered the pilot to change course toward the Falklands. The pilot attempted to land at the racecourse but the plane hit telegraph poles, and the undercarriage sank into the mud. Islanders, assuming that the plane was in trouble, rushed to assist but found themselves taken hostage by the hijackers (included in the group of four was a young police sergeant, Terry Peck, who became a local hero in the Falklands War). Les Gleadell, acting Governor of the Falkland Islands, ordered that the DC-4 be surrounded. He received three of the invaders, who announced that they had as much right as anyone to be there and in reply were firmly told that they should disarm and give up. The result of this meeting was an agreement that seven men, including Peck and Captain Ian Martin, commanding a four-man Royal Marines detachment, should be exchanged for the hostages aboard the aircraft. The 26 passengers were then allowed to disembark and sent to lodge with local families, as the island had no hotel. On being taken past the governor's residence, Guzmán laughingly commented: "Mi casa" ("my house").

After a bitterly cold night in the aircraft, which contained only brandy, wine, orange juice and a few biscuits, the kidnappers surrendered. They were kept locked up in an annex to St Mary's Church for a week until they were put aboard an Argentine ship, the Bahía Buen Suceso, which had lingered outside the harbor awaiting conclusion of the affair. The men were tried in Argentina on crimes that included illegal deprivation of freedom, possession of weapons of war, illegal association, piracy, and robbery in the open. The leaders were sentenced to three years in prison and the others to nine months.

On October of the same year a group of Argentine naval special forces conducted covert landings from the submarine ARA Santiago del Estero. The 12-man team, which landed some 40 kilometres (25 mi) from Stanley, was led by Juan José Lombardo who later, as Chief of Naval Operations, planned the 1982 invasion of the Falkland Islands.

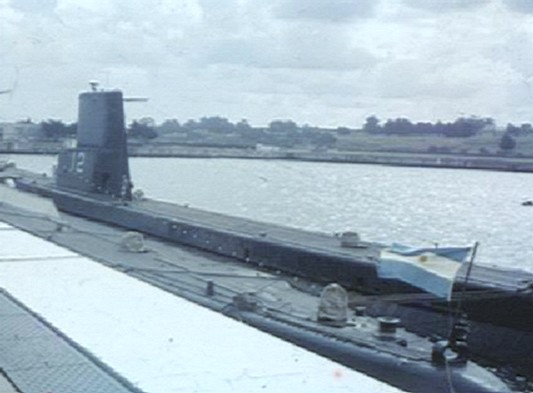
The locally upgraded Balao-class submarine ARA Santiago del Estero, Argentine Naval Base at Mar del Plata, circa 1969

In November 1968, Miguel Fitzgerald was hired by the Argentine press to attempt a reprise of his 1964 landing. Accompanied by one of the 1966 hijackers, he flew to Stanley but on arrival found he could not land at the racecourse due to obstacles placed following the hijacking. The plane was forced to crash land on Eliza Cove Road, but the two occupants were unharmed. The stunt was intended to coincide with the visit of Lord Chalfont to the islands.

The latter incident proved counter-productive to the Argentine sovereignty push, as Lord Chalfont had been talking to a public meeting at the time of the plane's arrival. The islanders made it plain to Lord Chalfont that they rejected a Memorandum of Agreement negotiated between Britain and Argentina that August which stated that Britain was prepared to discuss sovereignty provided the islanders' wishes were respected. This spurred the formation of the Falkland Islands Committee by London barrister Bill Hunter-Christie and others. The Emergency Committee, as it became known, proved to be an effective lobbying organisation, constantly undermining Foreign Office initiatives on sovereignty negotiations. In December 1968, the lobbying effort managed to force the British Government to state that the islanders' wishes would be paramount.

=== Growing links with Argentina ===
Partly as the result of diplomatic pressure, economic and political links with Argentina increased in the 1960s and 1970s. These became severed after the end of the Falklands War, but before the war they were not entirely negative, and some islanders sent their children to boarding schools in Argentina.

Realising that any talks on the sovereignty issue would be derailed if it did not meet with the islanders' wishes, the British and Argentine Governments enacted a series of measures designed to encourage dependence on Argentina. In 1971, following secret talks between the two Governments (and without consulting the islanders), the communications agreement was signed. The thrust of the agreement was the establishment of direct air and sea links between the islands and Argentina, together with agreements on postal and telephony services. Following the agreement the subsidised shipping link with Montevideo ended, a passenger and cargo ship service to the mainland (that would ameliorate any dependence on Argentina) was promised by the British but never provided.

Líneas Aéreas del Estado (LADE), the airline operated by the Argentine Air Force (Fuerza Aérea Argentina or FAA), began an air link to the islands. Initially this service operated amphibious aircraft between Comodoro Rivadavia and Stanley using Grumman HU-16 Albatross aircraft. The inauguration of the service was commemorated by a series of stamps issued by both the Argentine and Falkland Island postal services. In 1972, a temporary airstrip was constructed by Argentina near Stanley. Britain constructed a small permanent airstrip in 1976 suitable only for short haul flights.

As part of the agreement, islanders had to travel via Argentina and were forced to carry Argentine Identity Cards issued in Buenos Aires. The Tarjeta Provisoria or "white card" as they were known were hated by the islanders, who felt they were a de facto Argentine passport, since only islanders were required to use them and not other temporary residents of the islands. Tensions were raised further with the agreement that male Falkland Islanders would not have to undertake conscription into the Argentine Army, since this carried the implication that Falkland Islanders were Argentine citizens.

LADE set up an office in Stanley and mail was routed through Argentina. Medical treatments unavailable in the islands were provided in Argentina and scholarships were made available for study in Buenos Aires, Córdoba and other Argentine cities. Spanish language teachers were provided by Argentina. Foreign Office officials in Stanley were instructed to do everything possible to foster good relations between the Falkland Islands and Argentina.

The islands became more dependent upon Argentina, when the British and Argentine governments agreed that the islands would be supplied with petrol, diesel and oil by YPF, the Argentine national oil and gas company.

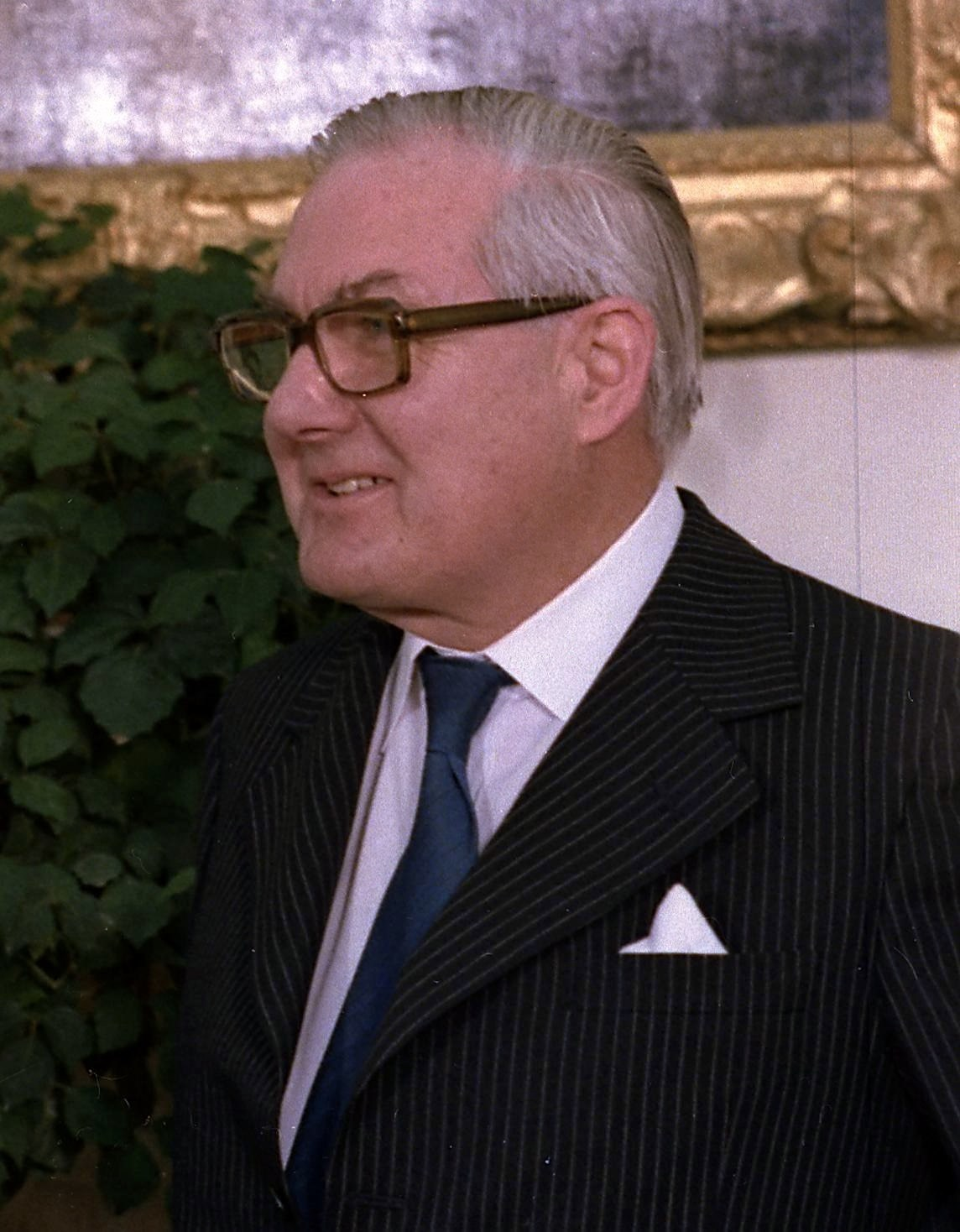
Prime Minister Jim Callaghan sent a naval task force in response to Argentine pressure in 1976.

Despite these tensions relationships between the islanders and the Argentines operating the new services in the islands were cordial. Although there was apprehension, politics were generally avoided and on a one-to-one basis there was never any real hostility.

On the international level, relations began to sour in 1975 when Argentine delegates at the London meeting of the International Parliamentary Union condemned Britain's "act of international piracy" in establishing a colony in the Falkland Islands. Diplomatic relations between Britain and Argentina were broken but resumed in 1976.

In October 1975, the British Government tasked Lord Shackleton (son of the Antarctic explorer Sir Ernest Shackleton) with an economic survey of the Falkland Islands. The Argentine Government reacted furiously and refused permission for Lord Shackleton to travel via Argentina. Later the ship transporting Shackleton to the islands, RRS Shackleton, was fired upon by the Argentine destroyer ARA Almirante Storni.

In 1976, after a military junta took control of the country, Argentina covertly established a military base on Southern Thule. It was discovered by the British Antarctic Survey ship RRS Bransfield in 1977. The British protested but restricted their response to a diplomatic protest. Backing up the diplomatic efforts, the British Prime Minister Jim Callaghan sent a naval task force consisting of surface ships and a nuclear submarine. Nevertheless, Argentine aircraft and warships harassed ships fishing in Falkland waters.

Lord Shackleton's report was delivered in 1977 and documented the economic stagnation in the islands. It nevertheless concluded that the islands made a net contribution to the British economy and had economic potential for development. Recommendations included oil exploration, exploitation of the fisheries, extension of the Stanley runway, the creation of a development agency, the expansion of the road network, expansion of the facilities at Stanley harbour and the breakdown of absentee landlord owned farms into family units. The report was largely ignored at the time, as it was felt that acting upon it would sour relations with Argentina. A reprise of the report by Lord Shackleton in 1982 following the Falklands War became the blueprint for subsequent economic development of the islands.

=== Falklands War ===
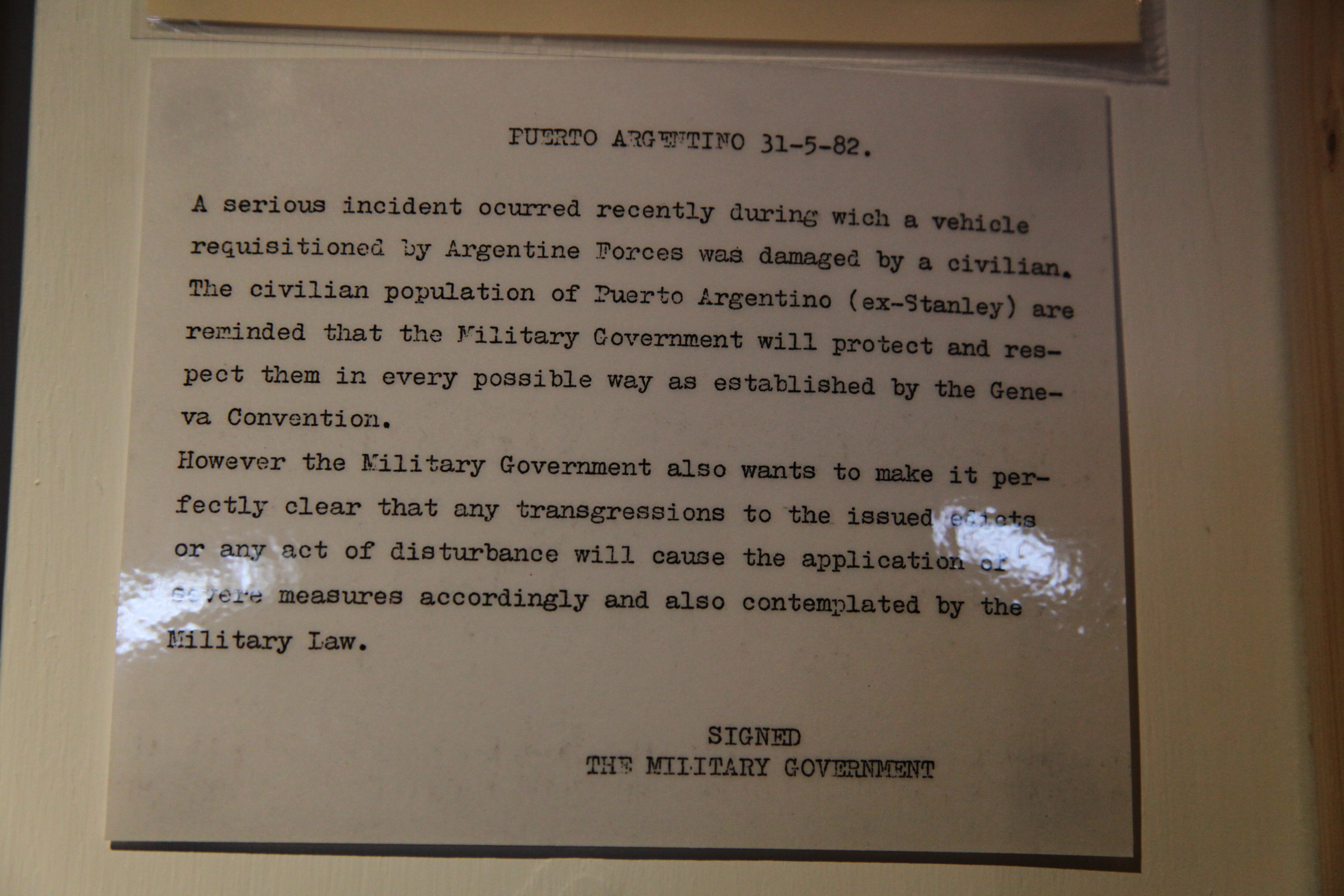
A message issued by the Argentine Military Governor during the occupation warning the Islanders against attempts to sabotage Argentine military equipment.

Argentina invaded the islands on 2 April 1982, using special forces, which landed at Mullet Creek and advanced on Government House in Stanley, with a secondary force coming in from Yorke Bay. They encountered little opposition, there being only a small force of fifty-seven British marines and eleven sailors, in addition to the Falkland Islands Defence Force (who were later sent to Fox Bay). There was only one Argentine fatality. The event garnered international attention at a level which the islands had never experienced before, and made them a household name in the UK.

For a brief period, the Falkland Islands found themselves under Argentine control. This included Spanish-language signage, and attempts to make the islanders drive on the right (although few roads in the Falklands at the time actually had two lanes). In many parts of the Camp, such as Goose Green and Pebble Island, the islanders found themselves under house arrest.

The British responded with an expeditionary force that landed seven weeks later and, after fierce fighting, forced the Argentine garrison to surrender on 14 June 1982. The war proved to be an anomaly in a number of different respects, not least that it proved that small arms still had a role to play. It also had major consequences for the military junta, which was toppled soon afterwards.

Margaret Thatcher's general political legacy remains controversial and divisive within the UK and within the context of the Falklands her government's withdrawal of HMS Endurance is a stated contributing factor to the causes of the conflict because it gave the wrong signals about the UK attitude towards maintaining its possession. However, within the Falklands, she is considered a heroine because of the determination of her response to the Argentine invasion. The islanders celebrate Margaret Thatcher Day on 10 January; and Thatcher Drive in Stanley is named after her.

== Post-war ==
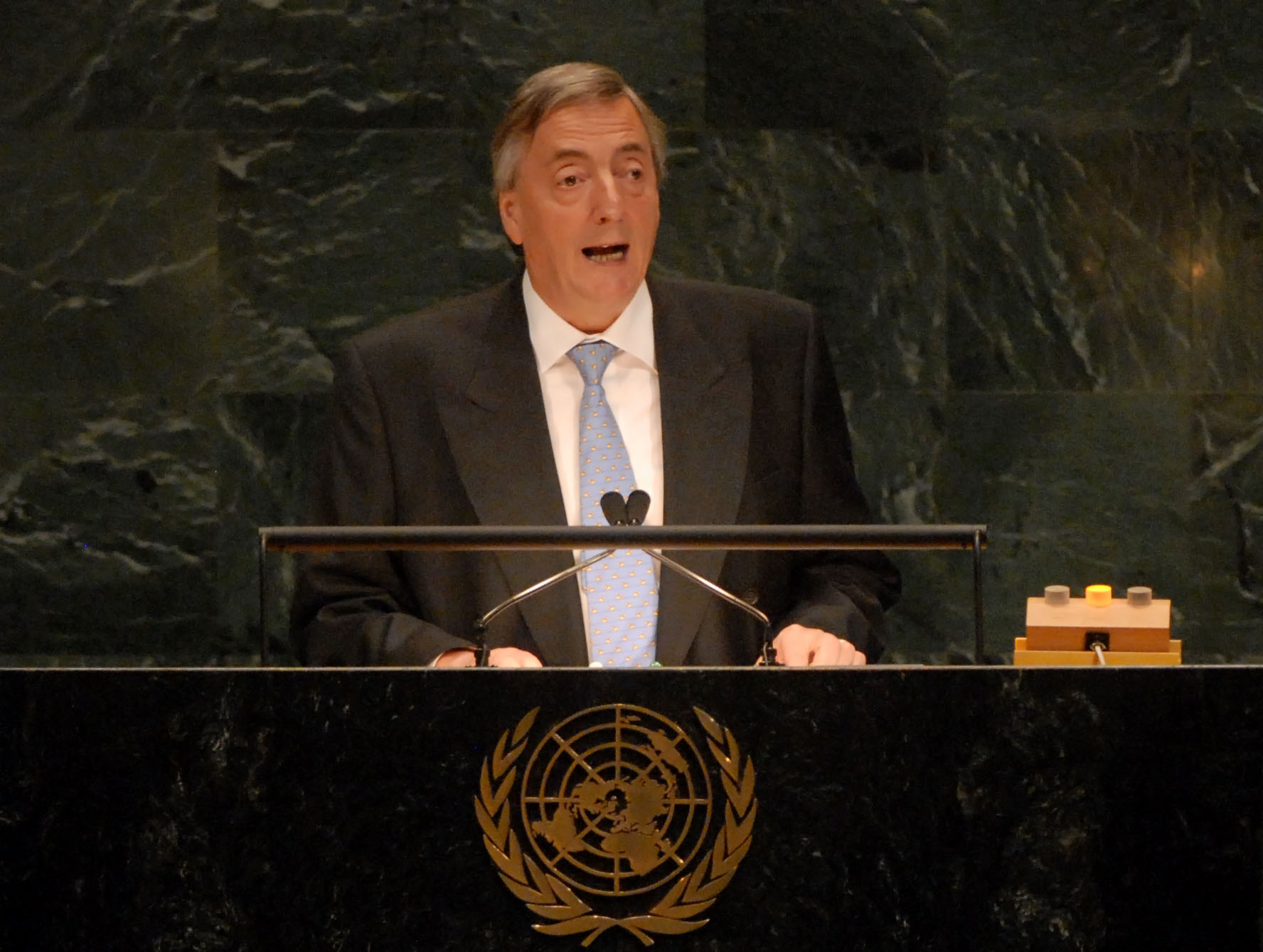
President Néstor Kirchner continued to pursue Argentine claims to the islands.

Following the war, Britain focused on improving its facilities on the islands. It increased its military presence significantly, building a large base at RAF Mount Pleasant and its port at Mare Harbour. It also invested heavily in improving facilities in Stanley and transport and infrastructure around the islands, tarmacking the Stanley–Mount Pleasant road and many roads within Stanley. The population has risen due to the growth of Stanley, but has declined in Camp (the countryside). Since November 2008, a regular ferry service has linked East and West Falkland, carrying cars, passengers and cargo serviced by MV Concordia Bay, a 42.45 m (139 ft 3 in) twin-screw shallow draught landing craft.

A major change to the governance of the Falkland Islands was introduced by the 1985 constitution. The Falkland Islands Government (FIG) became a parliamentary representative dependency, whose members are democratically elected; while the governor, as head of government and representative of the monarch, is purely a figurehead without executive powers. Effectively, the Falkland Islands are self-governing, with the exception of foreign policy. (The FIG represents itself at the United Nations Special Committee on Decolonisation, as the British Government no longer attends.)

Links with Argentina were severed in the post-war period, and laws introduced forbidding Argentine citizens from buying land. An alternative trading partner was found in Chile, with links developing over the years, including flights to Punta Arenas (in the far south of Patagonian Chile, near Tierra del Fuego). In recent years, Argentines have been allowed to visit the islands again, often to visit the military cemeteries where their friends and loved ones are buried.

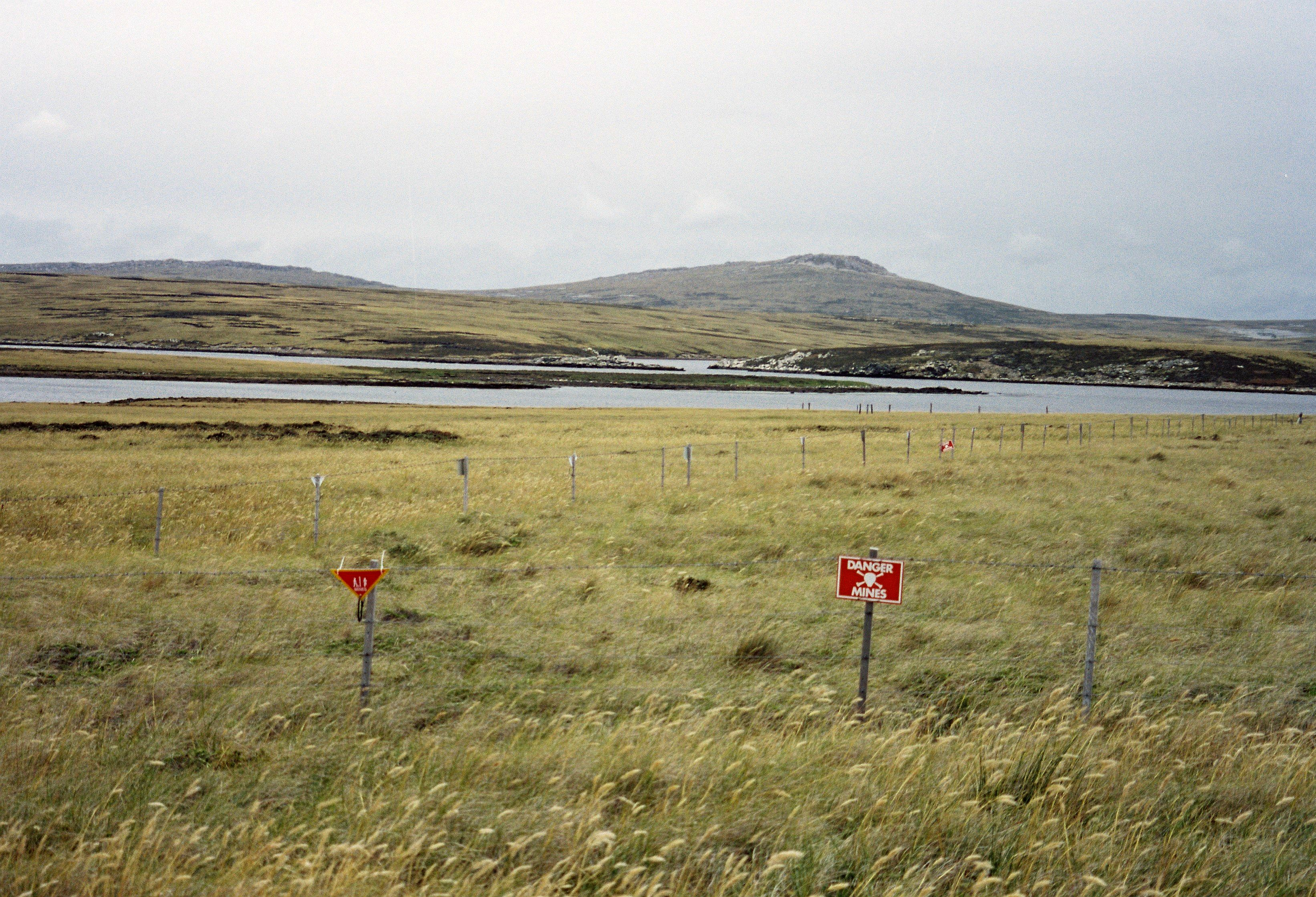
An Argentine minefield at Port William

Land mines were a persistent problem for 38 years following the war. Land mine clearance was completed by November 2020.

In 1983, the UK passed the British Nationality (Falkland Islands) Act granting full British citizenship to the islanders. High-profile dignitaries visited to show British commitment to the islands, including Margaret Thatcher, the Prince of Wales, and Princess Alexandra. In 1985, the Falkland Islands Dependency was split into the Falkland Islands proper and a newly separate territory of South Georgia and the South Sandwich Islands.

Relations between the UK and Argentina remained hostile after 1982. Although the United Nations General Assembly passed a resolution calling on the UK and Argentina to return to negotiations over the Islands' future, the UK ruled out further talks over the islands' sovereignty. The UK also maintained the arms embargo against Argentina that they initiated during the war, compelling the Argentine armed forces (a traditional UK buyer) to switch to other markets. Diplomatic relations were restored in 1989.

Relations between the UK and Argentina improved further in the 1990s. In 1998, Argentine President Carlos Menem visited London, where he reaffirmed Argentina claims to the Islands, but stated that only peaceful means would be used for their recovery. In 2001, UK Prime Minister Tony Blair visited Argentina, where he stated his hope that the UK and Argentina could resolve their differences. However, no talks on sovereignty took place during the visit.

=== Increased British military presence and new bases ===
After the war, the British still faced potential future aggression, so an aircraft carrier was kept on station guarding the islands with its squadron of Sea Harriers, while the local airfield was prepared for jet aircraft. HMS Hermes took guard duty first, whilst HMS Invincible went north to change a gearbox. Invincible then returned to relieve Hermes, which urgently needed to have its boilers cleaned. Invincible remained until HMS Illustrious was rushed south (being commissioned during the journey). Once the Port Stanley runway was ready for jets, several RAF F-4 Phantoms were stationed there, relieving Illustrious.

The islands lacked barracks for a permanent garrison, so the Ministry of defence chartered two former car ferries as barracks ships: Rangatira from the Union Company of New Zealand and Saint Edmund from Sealink in Britain. Rangatira arrived in Port Stanley on 11 July 1982 and stayed until 26 September 1983.

Later, the British government decided to construct a new RAF base as the centrepiece of plans to strengthen the island defences and deter any further attempts to take the Falklands by force. This was a massive undertaking – including construction of the world's longest corridor, one-half mile (800 metres) linking the barracks, messes, recreation and welfare areas of the base. The base is occasionally referred to by residents as "the Death Star" because of its vast size and sometimes confusing layout.

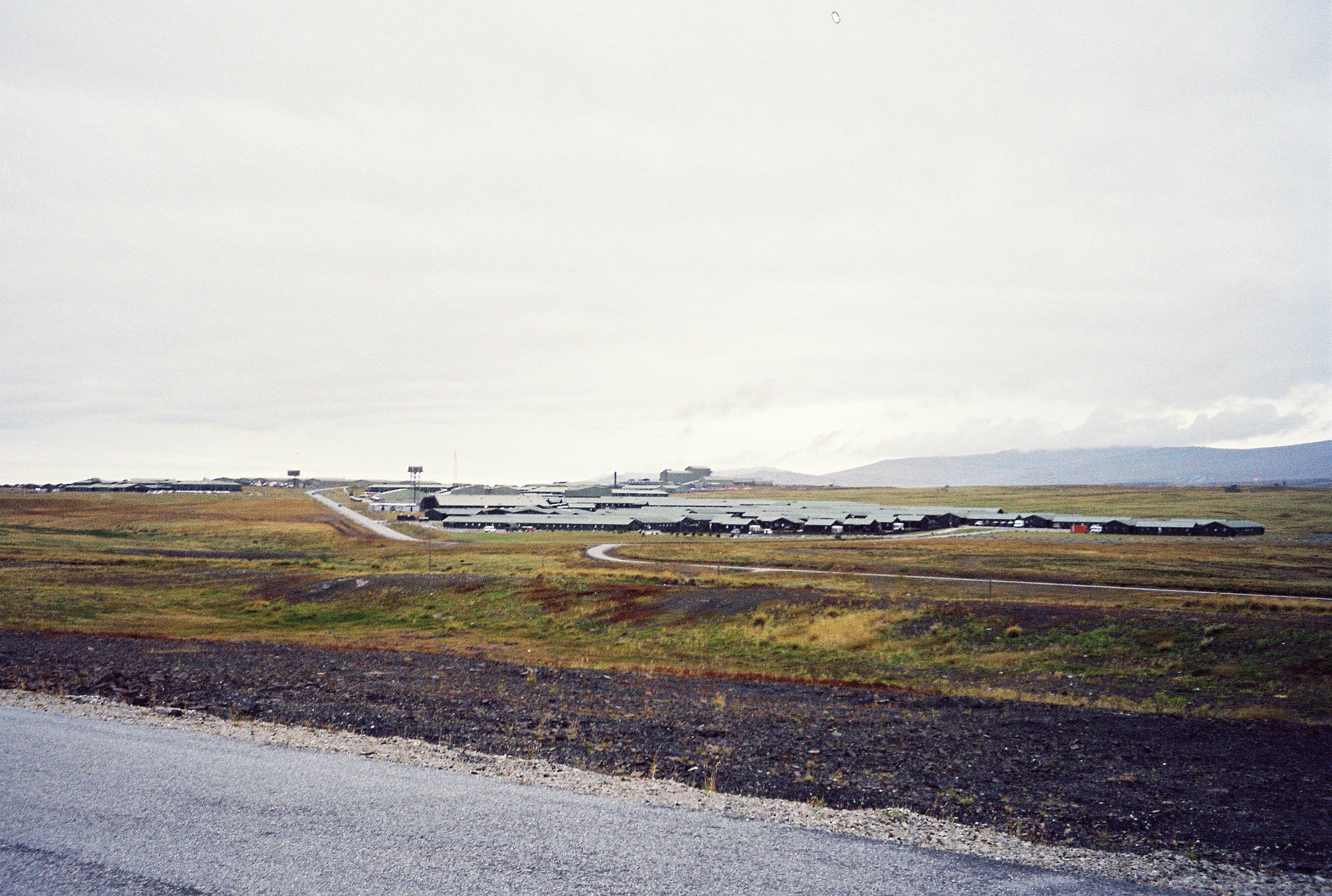
RAF Mount Pleasant

Mount Pleasant, to the west of Stanley, was chosen as the site for the new base. The airfield was opened by The Duke of York in 1985, and became fully operational in 1986.

Using the IATA airport code MPN, RAF Mount Pleasant also acts as the Falkland Islands' only international airport, in addition to its military role. Flights open to civilian passengers are operated twice-weekly. These flights are currently operated by a civilian airline on behalf of the Royal Air Force, and fly to and from RAF Brize Norton in Oxfordshire, UK with a refuelling stop at RAF Ascension Island in the south-central Atlantic Ocean. Chilean airline LAN Airlines also operate weekly flights from Santiago.

=== Attempts at diversifying the economy ===
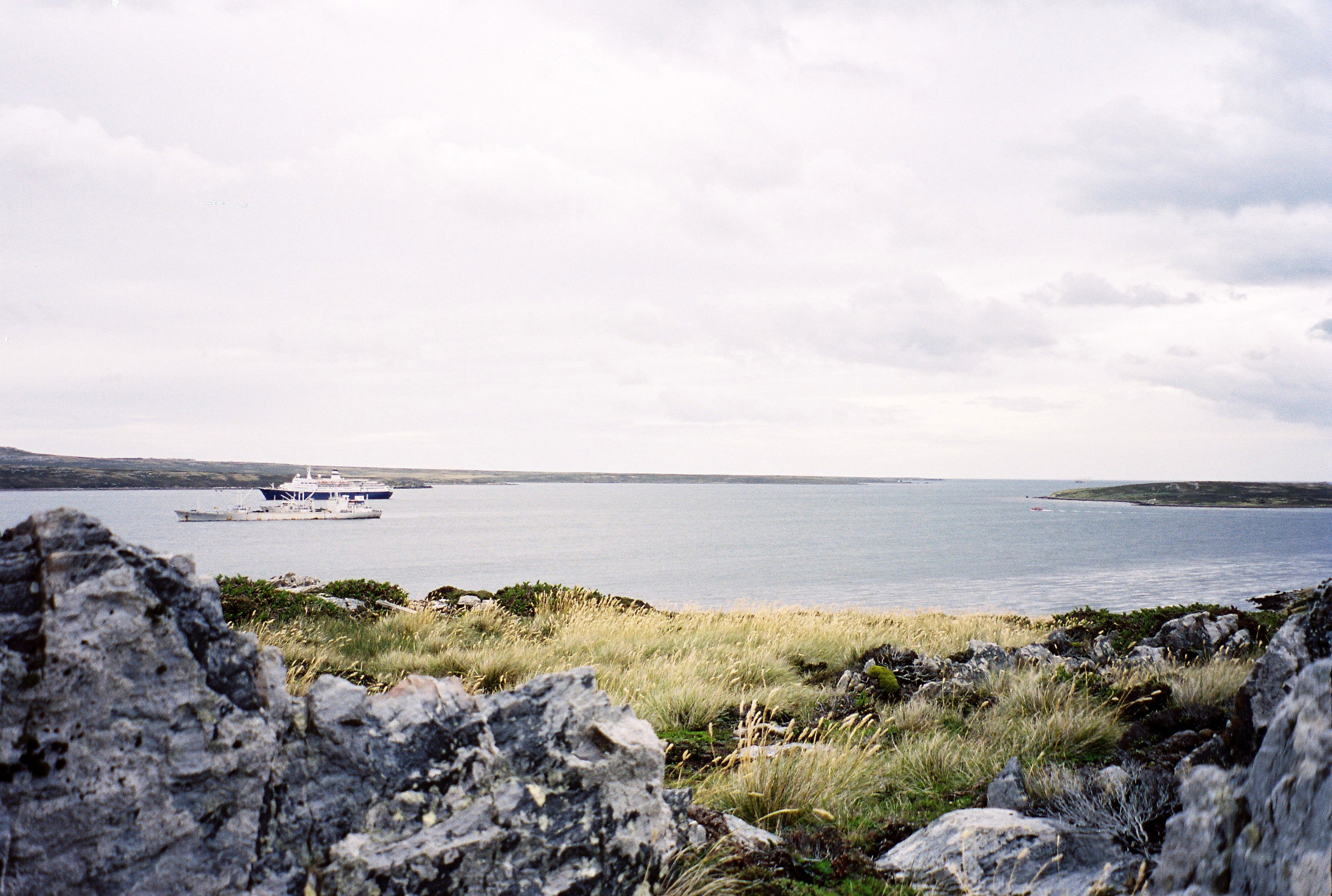
A squid trawler, and a cruise ship in Port William representing two trends in recent economic development

Before the Falklands War, sheep-farming was the Falkland Islands' only industry. Since the late 1980s, when two species of squid popular with consumers were discovered in substantial numbers near the Falklands, fishing has become the largest part of the economy.

On 14 September 2011, Rockhopper Exploration announced plans under way for oil production to commence in 2016, through the use of Floating production storage and offloading (FPSO) technology, replicating the methodology used on the Foinaven field off the Shetland Islands. The production site will require approximately 110 people working offshore and another 40 working onshore. The oil is expected to trade at 90–105% of the Brent crude price.

Some small businesses attempted at Fox Bay have included a market garden, a salmon farm and a knitting mill with "Warrah Knitwear".

Tourism is the second-largest part of the economy. The war brought the islands newfound fame; now tourists come both to see wildlife and go on war tours. Cruise ships often visit, frequently as a tie-in to Antarctica. Nonetheless, the remoteness of the archipelago, and the lack of direct flights to major cities, make the Falklands an expensive destination.

=== Conservation ===
In line with increasing global interest in environmental issues, some nature reserves have been established around the islands, although there are no national parks. In 1990, the Clifton family who owned Sea Lion Island sold it to the Falkland Island Development Company. They had planted 60,000 stands of tussac grass, considered important because on the main islands much tussac has been depredated by grazing. A similar trend may be seen on Bleaker Island, where the farm "went organic" in 1999. Also in the 1990s, Steeple Jason Island and Grand Jason Island were bought by New York philanthropist Michael Steinhardt, who later donated them to the Bronx Zoo-based Wildlife Conservation Society. He also gave them US$425,000 to build a conservation station named after himself and his wife Judy.

== See also ==
- History of South Georgia and the South Sandwich Islands
- Origins of Falkland Islanders
- Puerto Soledad
- Falkland Islands sovereignty dispute
- The Falkland Islands Journal
- Timeline of the history of the Falkland Islands
