= Yorke Bay =

Bay in the Falkland Islands

Coordinates: 51.678°S 57.803°W

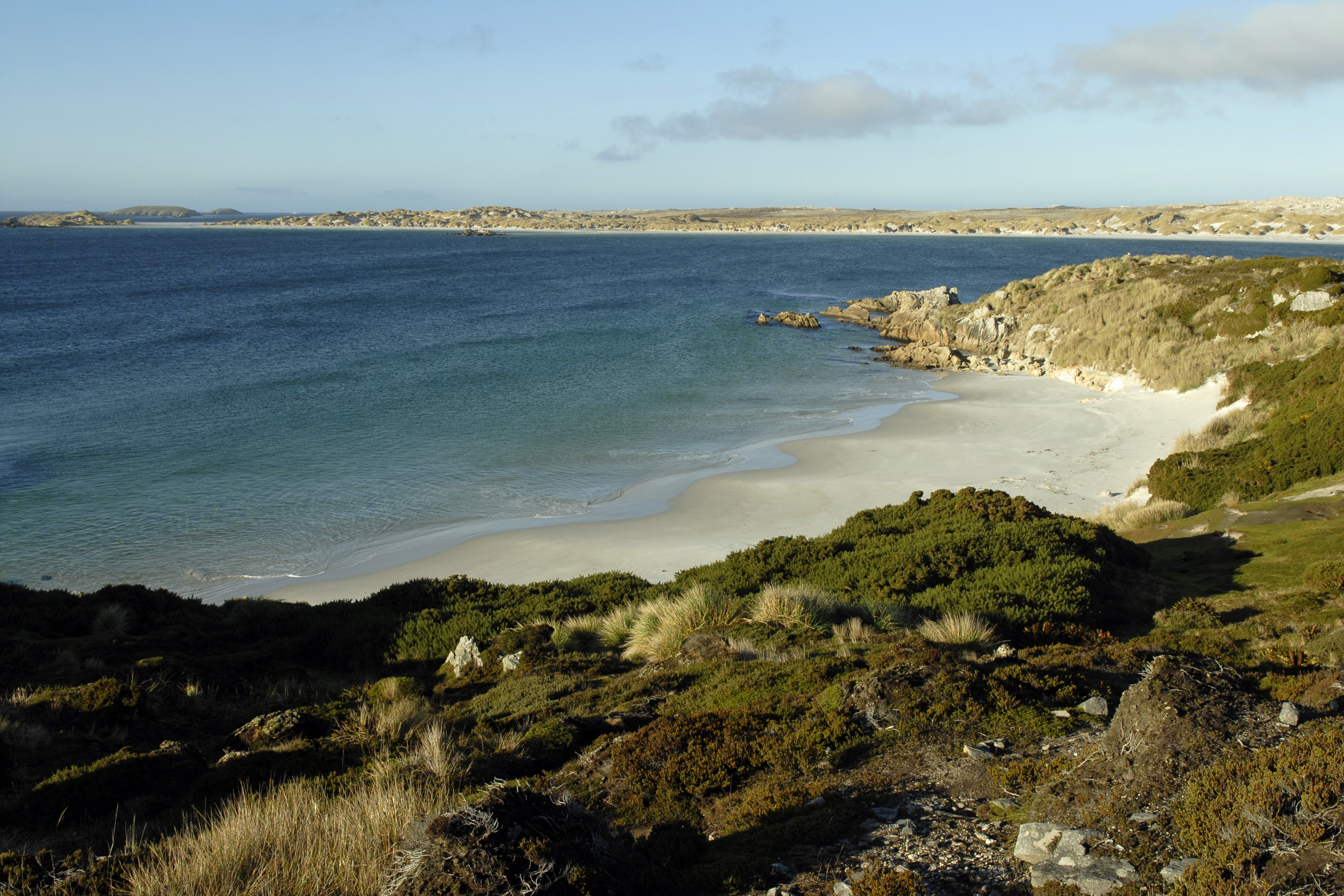
Gypsy Cove on East Falkland

Yorke Bay is a bay on East Falkland in the Falkland Islands. It is located 800 metres (2,600 ft) north of Port Stanley Airport, 6.4 kilometres (4 mi) to the northeast of the capital city of Stanley, on a peninsula connected to the mainland by the Boxer Bridge and a narrow isthmus known as "The Neck". Gypsy Cove is a smaller bay located on the west side of Yorke Bay. Most cruise ships pass Yorke Bay and Gypsy Cove on the way to dock in Stanley Harbour. It faces northwards into Port William, with Canopus Hill to the south, and is known internationally as a breeding site for the threatened Magellanic penguin.

== Minefields ==
Because of Yorke Bay's strategic position as one of only three bays close to both Stanley and the airport with beaches capable of supporting an expected amphibious landing on the east coast of East Falkland (the others being Surf Bay and Rookery Bay due east of Stanley), Yorke Bay beach was heavily mined with hundreds of anti-personnel and anti-tank minimum metal mines during the 1982 Argentine occupation of the Falkland Islands. The British forces eventually marched on Stanley from the landward side to the west instead, but the minefields around the airport remained and were never removed.

Prior to the war, Yorke Bay was a popular summer swimming and recreation site for local residents, but the entire northern coast of the Port Stanley Airport peninsula (including Yorke Bay) have been fenced and marked as strictly off-limits since a tractor and bulldozer were destroyed by an anti-tank mine while attempting to lay a pipeline in the area in 1986.

A Cranfield University assessment dismissing the feasibility of demining Yorke Bay noted that the sand dunes had expanded considerably since 1982, burying the mines too deeply for advanced detection equipment and disrupting the orderly lines in which they were originally laid. At the same time, however, any large storm could potentially cause large numbers of mines to suddenly resurface. To recover them all would thus require mass excavation of the entire beach area with armored digging equipment, a task that would be expensive, dangerous, unlikely to definitively succeed, and certain to do severe damage to the "internationally important" Magellanic penguin rookeries. Local residents and officials have also expressed opposition to the idea: Falklands Governor Howard Pearce stated that the high probability that "only 95 percent" of the mines would end up being accounted for would actually "bring a sense of complacency to the community and increase rather than reduce the chance of injury." As such, the bay is likely to remain permanently impassable for humans; on the positive side, the penguins have benefited from their undisturbed control of the beaches (being too small and too light to set off the mines), resulting in an unplanned, man-made wildlife refuge, an involuntary park where tourists can view the penguins safely from a distance without disrupting their habitat.

Since 2009, the UK has worked on removing mines from the area to comply with the international anti-personnel mine ban convention. On November 14, 2020, the island was declared free of landmines.

== Gallery ==
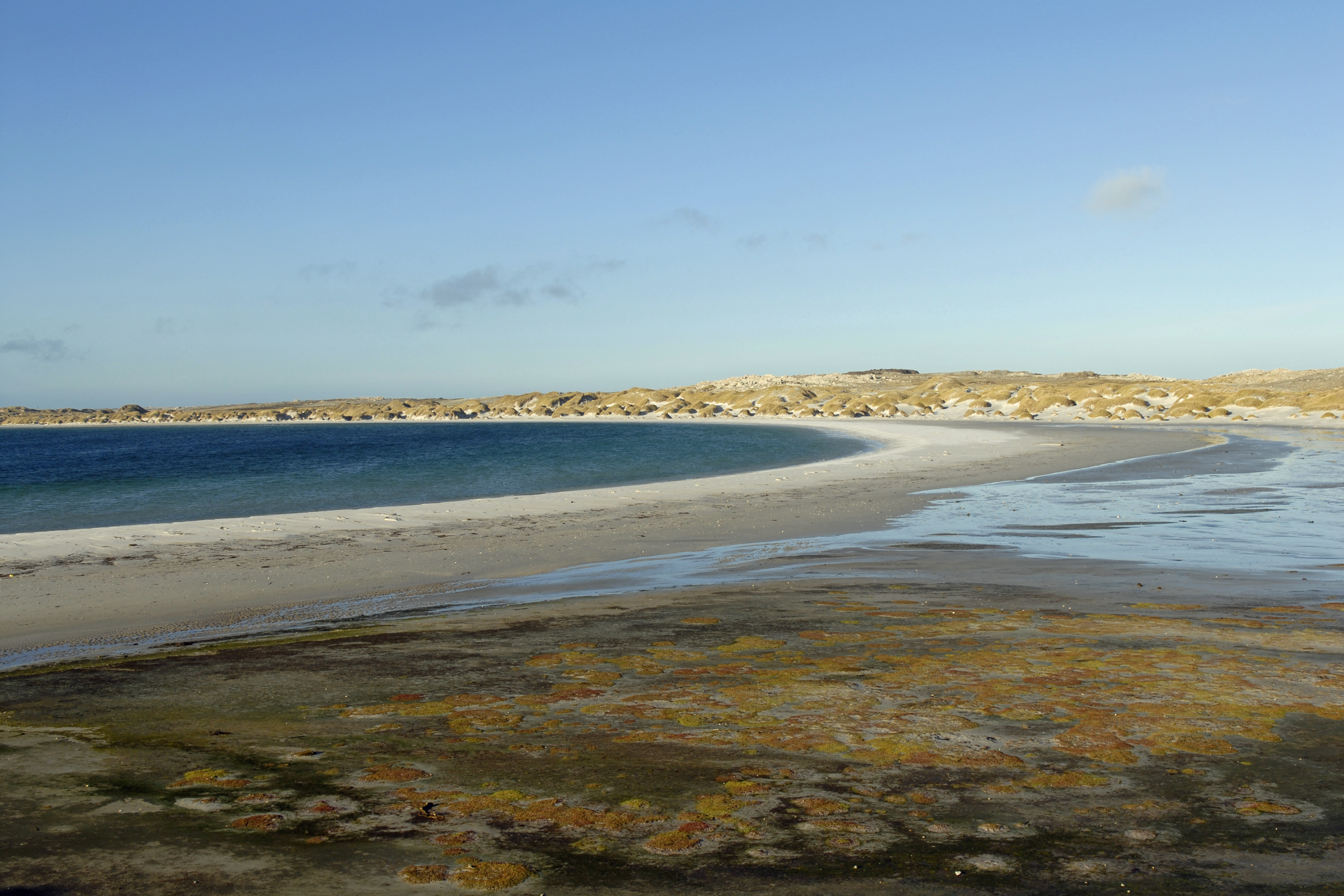
Yorke Bay on East Falkland

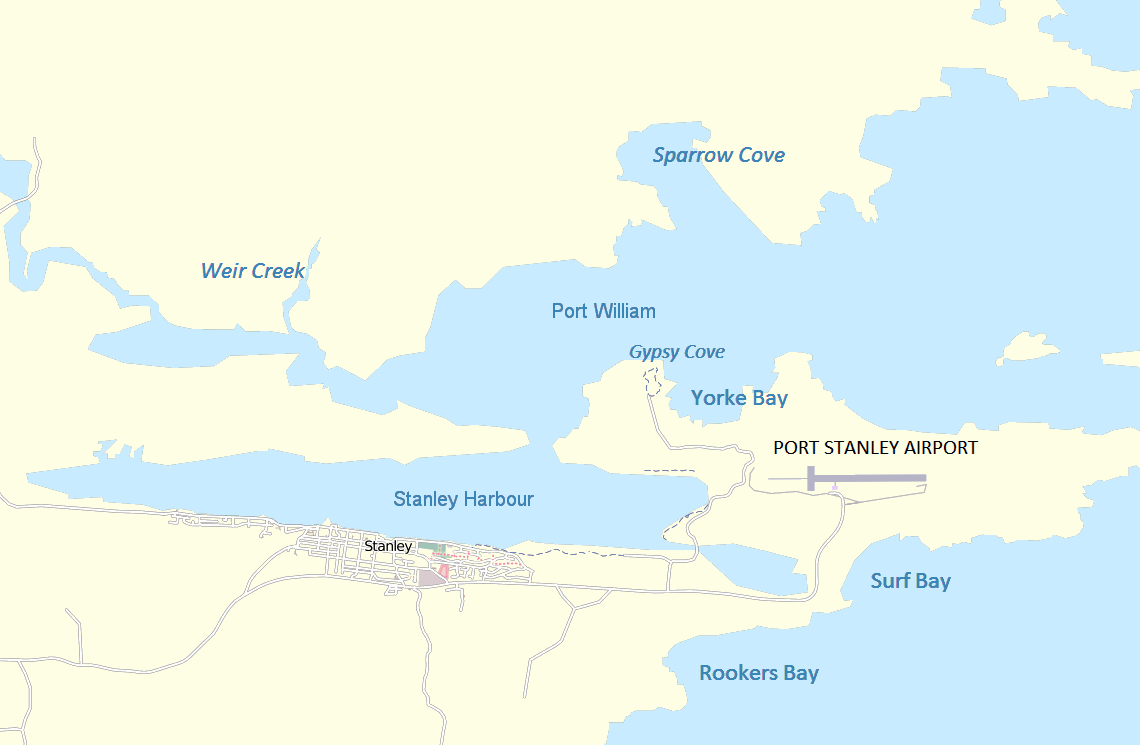
Map of the Stanley area, showing Yorke Bay and Gypsy Cove

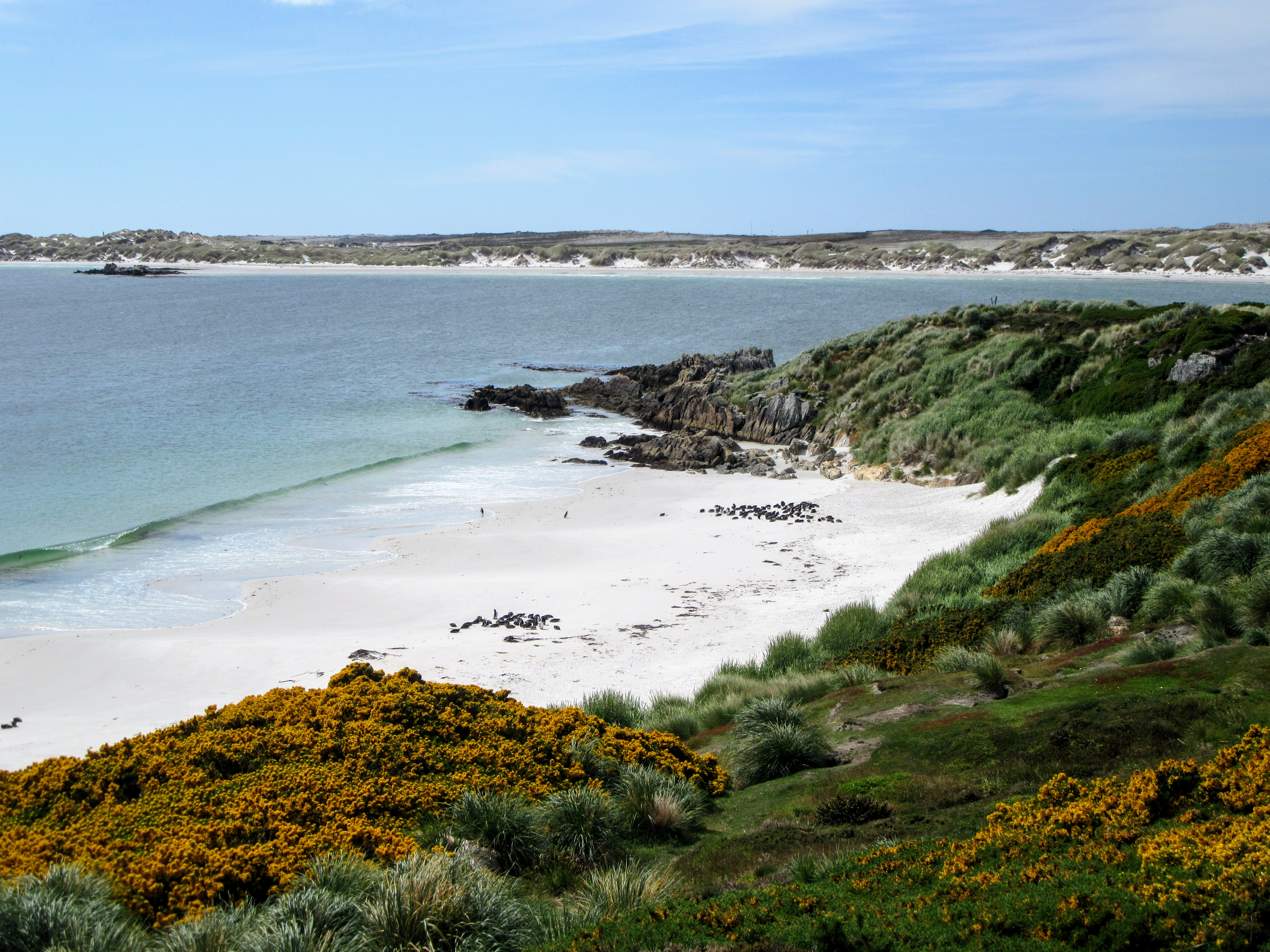
Gypsy Cove in Yorke Bay in 2019, with penguins on the beach

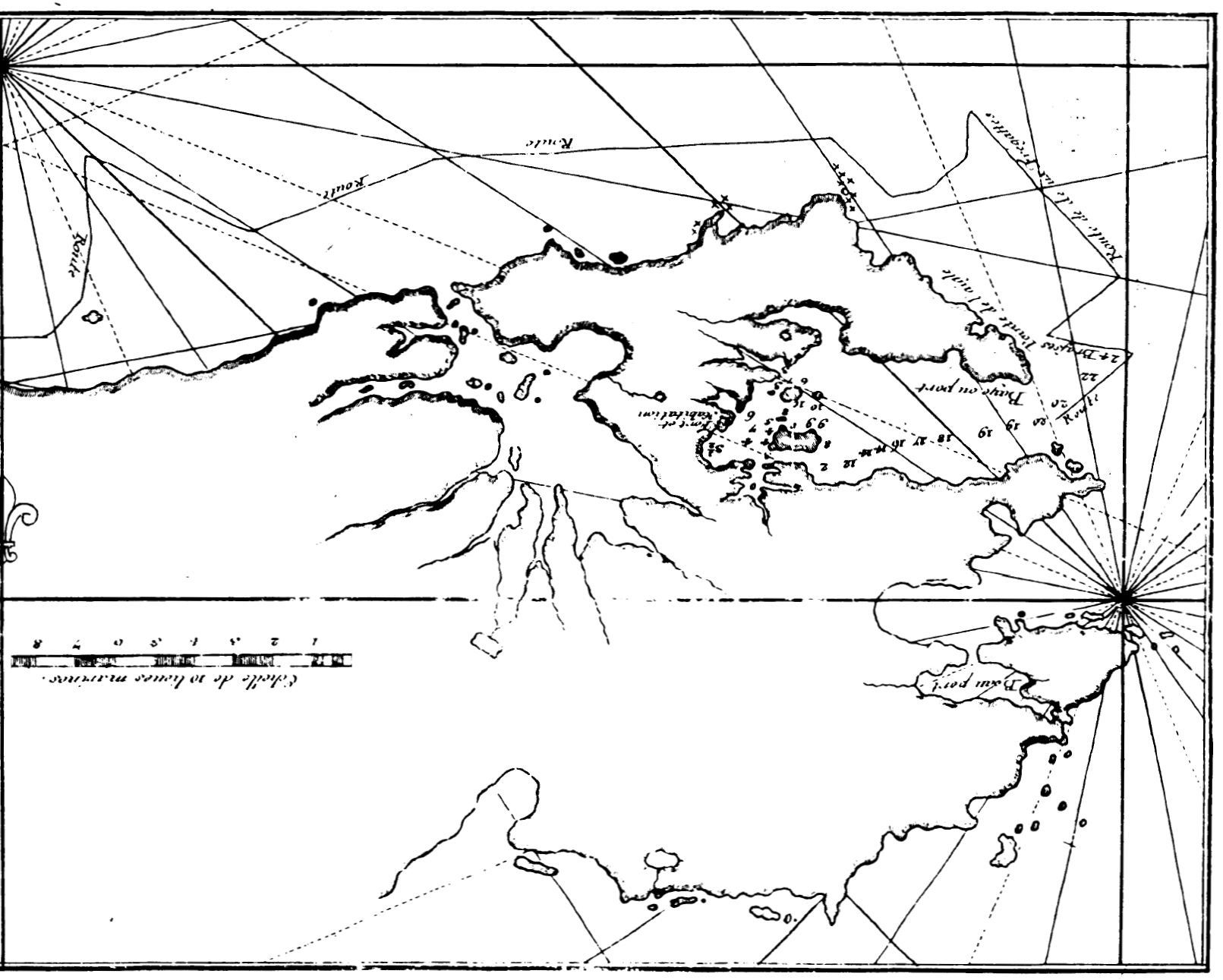
Early mapping of Yorke Bay (Dom Pernety, 1769)
