= Port William, Falkland Islands =

Coordinates: 51.667°S 57.786°W

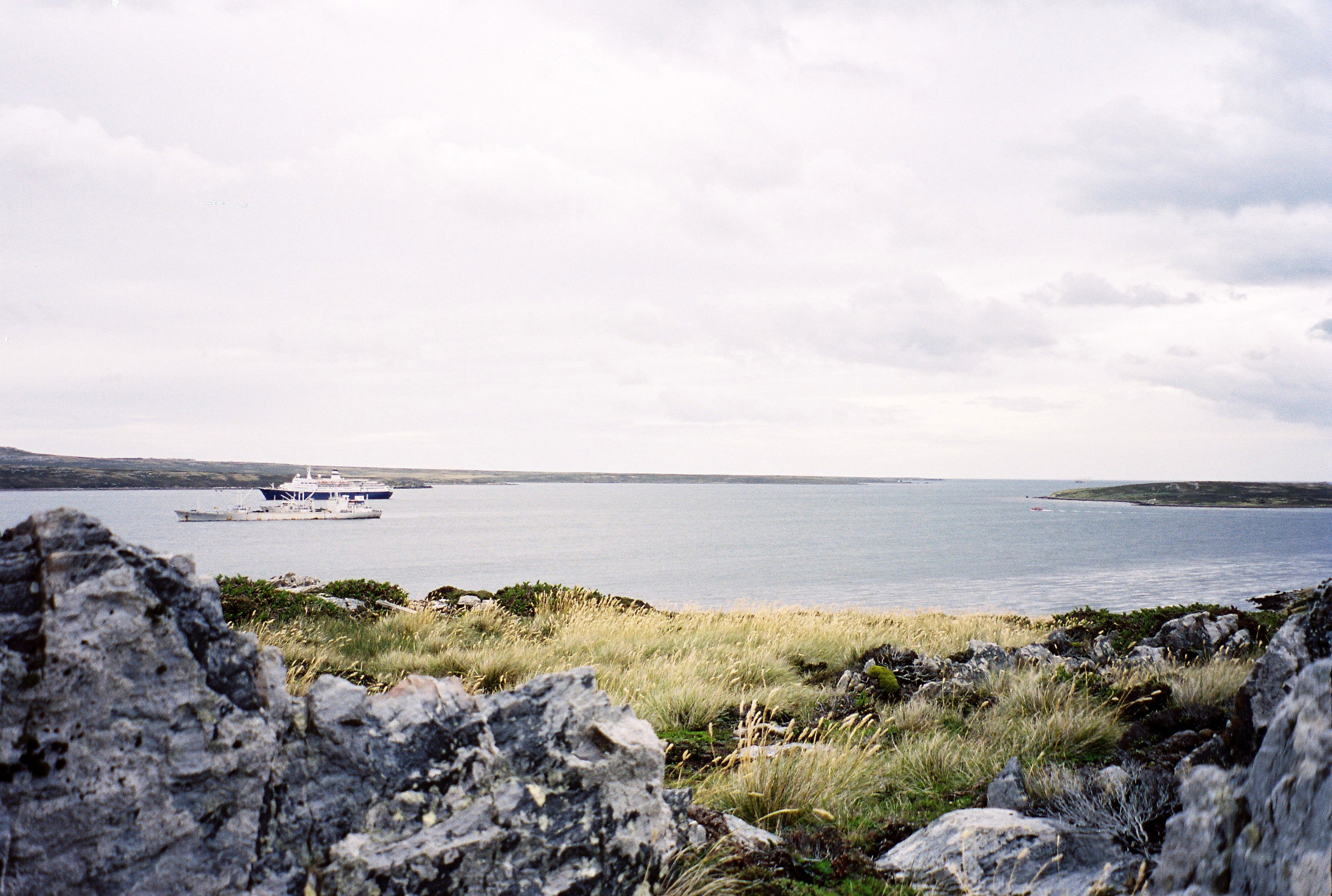
A cruise ship and a squid trawler in Port William, from the site proposed for a new deep water port development.

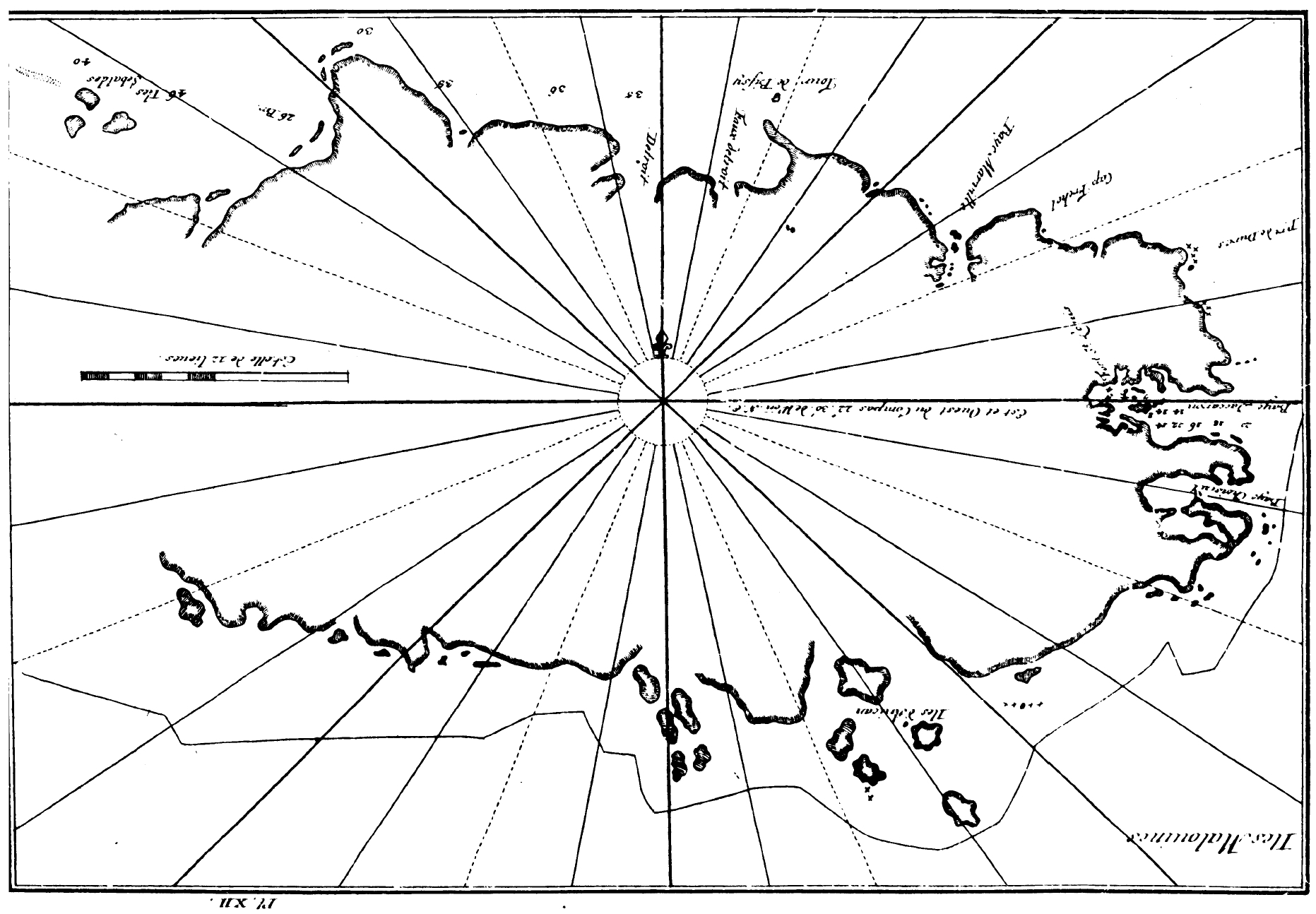
Early mapping of Port William (Dom Pernety, 1769)

Map of the Falkland Islands showing Port William

Port William (French: Baye Choiseul, Spanish: Puerto Groussac) is a large inlet on the east coast of East Falkland island. A strait called "the Narrows" leads into Stanley Harbour.

Port William has several other bays on it, namely Gypsy Cove and Yorke Bay, which is a noted beauty spot, Hearnden Water, which is effectively the estuary of the Murrell River and Weir Creek, Blanco Bay and Sparrow Cove. Kidney Island is just north of Port William.

The peninsula on which Canopus Hill, Stanley Airport and Gypsy Cove lie, together with a narrow spit of land known as Navy Point, effectively divides Port William from Stanley Harbour. As such this is the busiest waterway of the Falkland Islands and frequently visited by cruise ships, freighters and navy vessels, although this has lessened since the building of the two airports at RAF Mount Pleasant and Stanley Airport.

It was enlarged as the result of glacial action.

It was heavily mined due to the Falklands War, however the last mine was removed in November 2020.

== New deep water port ==
At a meeting of the Executive Council of the Falkland Islands (ExCo) on 24 October 2012 Members of the Legislative Assembly of the Falkland Islands (MLAs) instructed officials of the Falkland Islands Government (FIG) to proceed with costed proposals for a new deep water port and associated infrastructure at Port William.
