= Canopus Hill =

Hill in the Falkland Islands

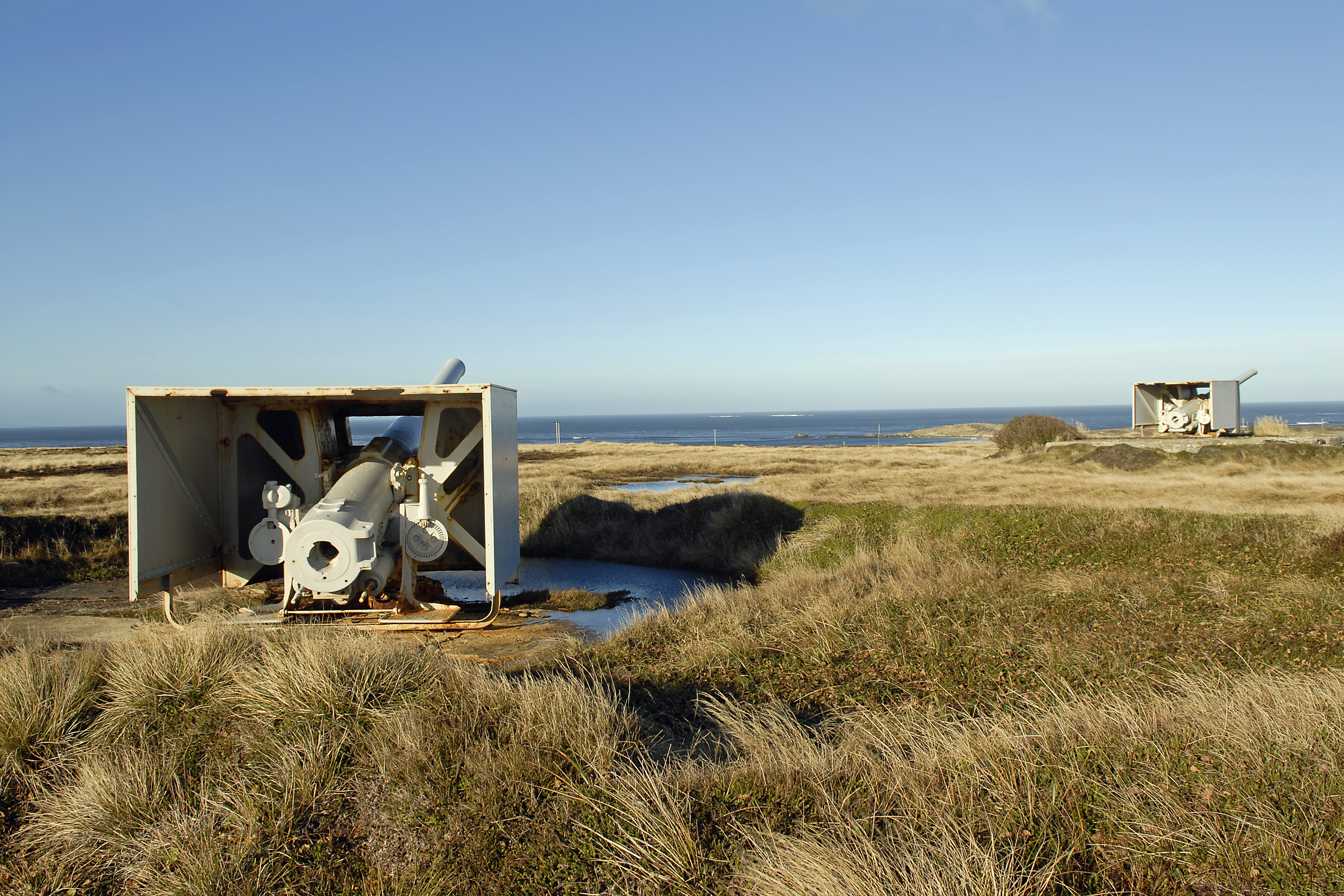
- Guns on Canopus Hill near Port Stanley, Falkland Islands

Highest point
- Elevation: 32 m (105 ft)
- Prominence: 32 m (105 ft)
- Coordinates: 51°41′24″S 57°47′17″W

Geography
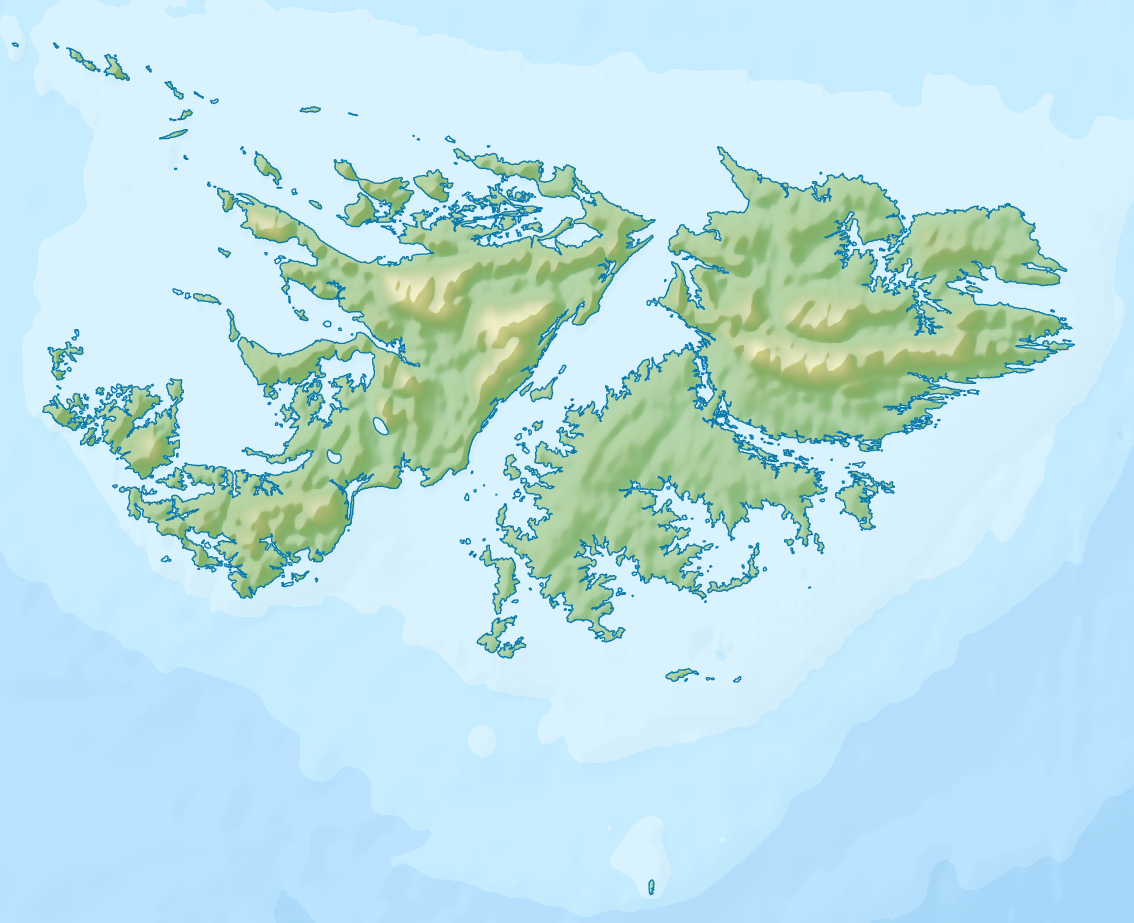
- Location within Falkland Islands
- Location: East Falkland, Falkland Islands, south Atlantic Ocean

Canopus Hill is located on the island of East Falkland near Stanley, the capital city of the Falkland Islands. It is named after HMS Canopus, which fired the first shots in the Battle of the Falkland Islands during World War I.
