= Teresa Parodi =

Argentine singer and songwriter

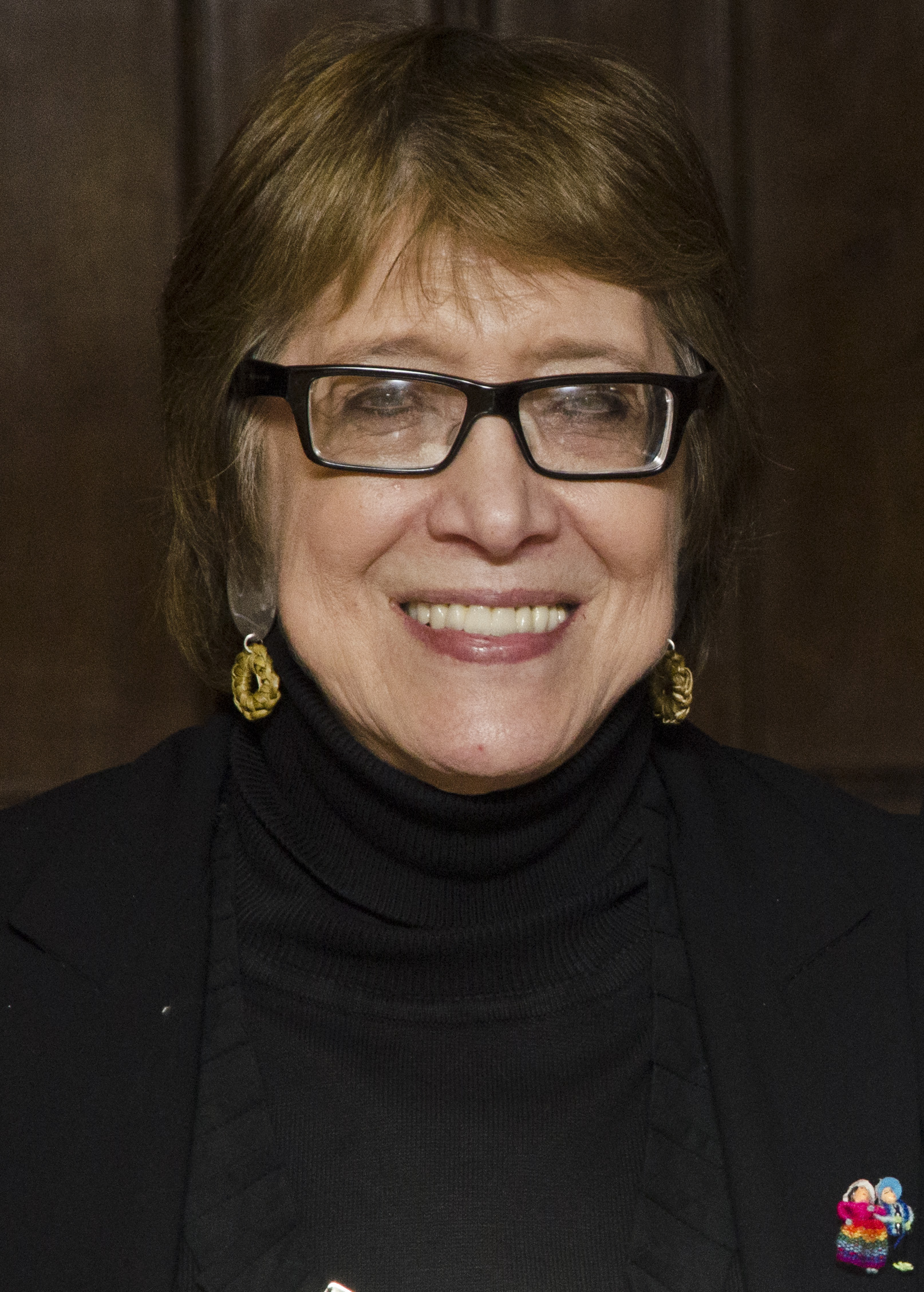

Minister of Culture
- In office May 7, 2014 – December 10, 2015
- President: Cristina Fernández de Kirchner
- Preceded by: Jorge Coscia (as Secretary of Culture)
- Succeeded by: Pablo Avelluto

Personal details
- Born: Teresa Adelina Sellarés; December 30, 1947 (age 78) Corrientes, Argentina
- Website: teresaparodi.com

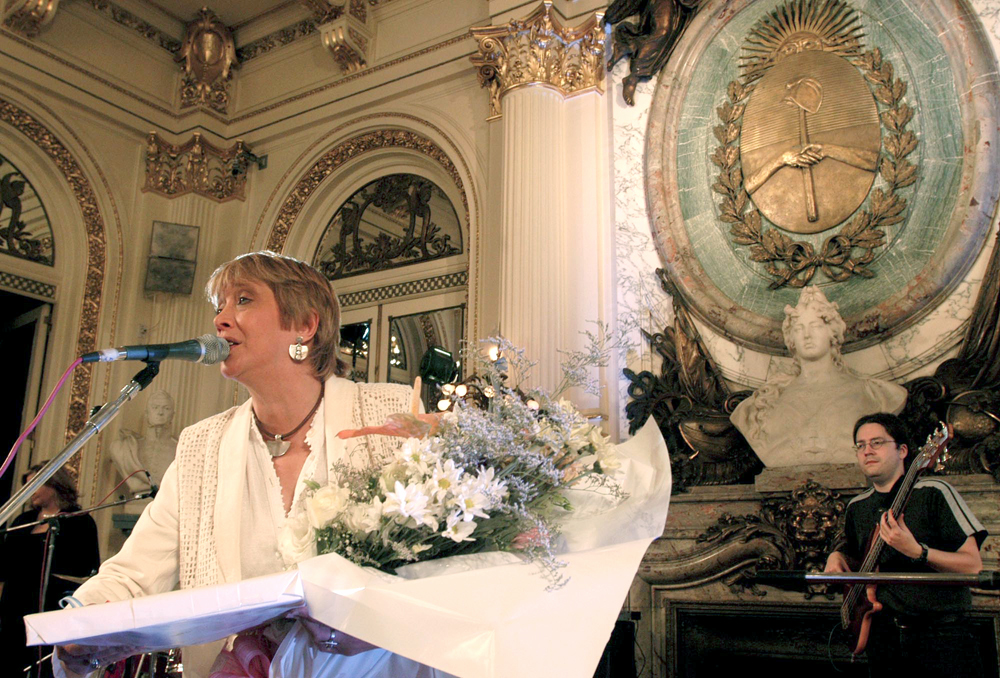
Teresa Parodi performing at the Casa Rosada in 2004.

Teresa Adelina Sellarés, best known as Teresa Parodi, (born December 30, 1947) is an Argentine singer and songwriter. She held the inaugural post of Minister of Culture of Argentina from May 6, 2014, to December 9, 2015. She was a deputy to the Mercosur Parliament (Parlasur) representing the nationwide district of Argentina from December 10, 2015, to October 6, 2016. She was elected on the Front for Victory ticket in the 2015 election.

== Life and career ==
Born Teresa Adelina Sellarés in Corrientes, she was introduced to music when studying singing and taking guitar lessons at the age of nine. Her grandmother hosted frequent music festivals in her farm along the Paraná River, and there she learned the Chamamé (a danceable genre of Argentine folk music) as well as Zambas, Chacareras, Huaynos, Cuecas, and other popular South American folk music genres. She later performed in numerous local festivals in her youth. She married Guillermo Parodi, a systems analyst, in 1967, and they had five children. Both politically active in the left-leaning Peronist Youth, her husband was briefly detained during the dictatorship that took power in 1976; he lost his job in Corrientes as a result, and in 1979 the couple relocated to Buenos Aires.

Teresa Parodi started her solo career at this time, performing at small venues in Buenos Aires, and in 1979 was brought on as guest vocalist for Astor Piazzolla's Nuevo tango quintet. Her 1980 debut album, Teresa Parodi desde Corrientes, was followed in 1983 by Canto a los hombres del pan duro ('A Song for Poor Men'), adding music to the work of prominent poets such as Jorge Luis Borges and Jorge Calvetti. Parodi was awarded the Consecration Award at the 1984 Cosquín National Folk Festival, and later performed as soloist in a number of notable events, including a 1986 concert with Cuban songwriter Pablo Milanés at Luna Park Stadium and in a 1988 tour of the U.S. and Europe. Parodi was voted Best Composer of the Decade in 1995, receiving a Platinum Konex Award to the effect, and in 1999 received the Gold Camín Lifetime Achievement Award at the Cosquín National Folk Festival. She was named Illustrious Citizen of Buenos Aires in 2006.

Parodi went to compose approximately 500 songs in 30 albums and has been a constant presence at the thousand folk festivals across Argentina as well as in San Diego, Houston, Washington, New Orleans, New York, Los Angeles, Miami, Santiago de Compostela, Paris, Brussels, Cuba, Mexico City, Chiapas, Monterrey, Antwerp, Zurich, Barcelona, Mataró, Stockholm, Amsterdam, São Paulo, Berlin, Seville, Tel Aviv, Jerusalem, Saragossa, Quito, and Asunción.

Following a decision to promote the Culture Secretariat to a cabinet-level ministry, on May 7, 2014, President Cristina Fernández de Kirchner nominated Parodi as the nation's first Minister of Culture.

In 2025, she revealed she has been in a romantic relationship with a woman since the 1990s.

== Awards and recognition ==
- 1984: Consecration Award, Festival Nacional de Folclore de Cosquín.
- 1994: Best Album (female singers) Con el alma en vilo, Asociación de Cronistas del Espectáculo (ACE).
- 1995: Platinum Konex Award, Best Songwriter/Composer of the Decade.
- 1996: 'Estrella de Mar' Award, Mar del Plata.
- 1999: Gold Camín Lifetime Achievement Award, Festival Nacional de Folclore de Cosquín.
- 1999: Fondo Nacional de las Artes Award.
- 2004: Carlos Gardel Award. Best Álbum Folclore Female Artist
- 2011: Premio Nacional de la Artes 2011 song: Aún caminan conmigo.

== Discography ==
- 1983: Canto a los hombres del pan duro, LP
- 1985: El purajheí de Teresa Parodi, LP
- 1986: Mba-e pa reicó, chamigo!, LP
- 1987: Teresa, LP
- 1988: Letra y música, LP
- 1988: El otro país, LP
- 1989: Otras cosas, LP
- 1990: Ya está la taba en el aire, LP
- 1991: De amores, sombras y transparencias, LP
- 1991: 11 de Latijns Amerika Festival, LP
- 1992: Pasiones, LP
- 1993: Correntinas, LP
- 1994: Con el alma en vilo, LP
- 1995: Correntinas II, LP
- 1996: Parte de mí, LP
- 1997: Como dicho al pasar, LP
- 1998: Señales de vida, LP
- 2001: El canto que no cesa, LP
- 2003: Soy feliz, LP
- 2005: Pequeñas revoluciones, LP
- 2007: Autobiografía, LP
- 2009: Corazón de pájaro.
- 2011: Otro cantar.
