= Grignon =

Grignon or Grignion may refer to:

== Places ==
- Rivière à Grignon, a tributary of lac Saint-Jean in Chambor, Quebec, Canada
- Grignon, Côte-d'Or, commune in Côte-d'Or department, France
- Grignon, Savoie, commune in Savoie department, France
- Grignon, a hamlet constituting, with the village of Thiverval, the commune of Thiverval-Grignon, in the department of Yvelines

== Other uses ==
- Institut National Agronomique Paris-Grignon, a French grande école, part of AgroParisTech

== Person with the surname ==
- Charles Grignion (disambiguation)
- Claude-Henri Grignon (1894–1976), writer, journalist, speaker and pamphleteer from Quebec
- Marcel Grignon (1914–1990), French cameraman
- Francis Grignon (born 1944), French politician
