= Olga Fernández Latour de Botas =

Argentine educator, folklorist and writer (1935–2025)

- Born: 27 March 1935; Buenos Aires, Argentina
- Died: 18 October 2025 (aged 90); Buenos Aires, Argentina
- Education: University of Buenos Aires; University of Salvador
- Employer(s): National Institute of Philology and Folklore Research; University of Salvador; Pontifical Catholic University of Argentina
- Organization(s): Argentine Academy of Letters; National Academy of History of Argentina; Ferlabó Institution
- Children: 3
- Honours: Ordre des Palmes académiques

Olga Elena Fernández Latour de Botas (27 March 1935 – 18 October 2025) was an Argentine educator, folklorist, cultural historian, poet and writer who published over 200 works. She was member of the Argentine Academy of Letters and the National Academy of History of Argentina. She was awarded the French Ordre des Palmes académiques.

== Early life and education ==
Fernández was born on 27 March 1935 in Buenos Aires, Argentina. Her father Enrique Fernández Latour worked as an official at the French embassy.

Fernández graduated from the second class of the National Dance School as a teacher of Argentine folk dances. She studied her undergraduate degree at the University of Buenos Aires, then her master's degree and PhD at the University of Salvador (USAL). Her doctoral thesis was on the subject of Marian devotion in Argentine folklore. Her thesis work was later published as a book titled ¡Achalay mi virgen! in 2014.

== Career ==
In 1956, Fernández began her career as a technician at the Argentine National Institute of Philology and Folklore Research (INAPL).

Fernández returned to her alma mater, USAL, to teach on folklore. In 1977, Fernández founded the USAL musical therapy programme. From 2003, Fernández worked at the Pontifical Catholic University of Argentina to plan their first folklore and literature delivery.

Fernández served on the organisation commissions of the inaugural and 1960 International Folklore Congress, and the 1980 International Congress of Hispanic American Folklore.

Fernández was founder of the charitable Ferlabó Institution in 1986. She was director of the Juan Bautista Alberdi Institute and Library, where she was project founder and director of the Atlas of Traditional Argentine Culture (ACTA) programme.

Fernández was a full member of three national academies: the Academia Argentina de Letras (Argentine Academy of Letters, AAL), the Argentine Academy of Interdisciplinary Knowledge, and the Academia Nacional de la Historia de la República Argentina (National Academy of History of Argentina). She was also a member of the Belgrano Academy of the Argentine Republic, the Browniana and the Sanmartiniana.

== Writing and research ==
While undertaking philological research, Fernández discovered historic manuscripts written by Jesuit priests about the languages of the indigenous South American Lule, Tonocoté and Mbyá peoples, in the collection of the Biblioteca Estense in Italy. She obtained copies of these documents and donated them to the National Academy of History of Argentina.

Fernández was the author of more than two hundred published works. She was particularly interested in the poetic repertoire of oral traditions.

=== Select publications ===
- Atlas histórico de la cultura tradicional Argentina (1984)
- Macedonio Fernández candidato a presidente y otros escritos de Enrique Fernández Latour (1998)
- La ofrenda de Gérard al Libertador San Martín (2000)
- Léxico de la planificación regional (2007)
- La flor del jardín (2007)
- ¡Achalay mi virgen! (2014)
- Bartolomé Hidalgo: un poeta sanmartiniano (2018)
- Desde América: miradas sobre el otro, por la comprensión, para la paz (2018)
- Cancionero tradicional de Entre Ríos (2023)

Fernández also published a collection of short stories in 2000.

== Personal life ==
Fernández was married to Miguel Ángel Botas.

== Death ==
Fernández died on 18 October 2025 in Buenos Aires, aged 90.

== Awards ==
- Konex Award (1994)
- Chevalier dans Ordre des Palmes académiques (2004, France)
- Independence Medal (Finland)
