= Jorge Coscia =

Argentine filmmaker and politician (1952–2021)

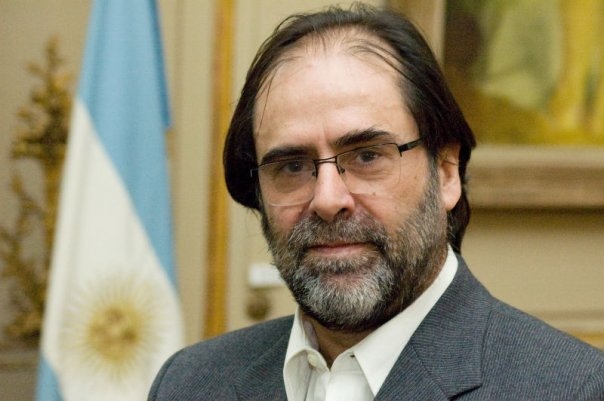
- Coscia in 2009

Secretary of Culture
- In office 8 July 2009 – 7 May 2014
- Preceded by: José Nun
- Succeeded by: Pablo Avelluto

National Deputy
- In office 10 December 2005 – 8 July 2009
- Constituency: Buenos Aires

Personal details
- Born: 26 August 1952 Buenos Aires, Argentina
- Died: 7 October 2021 (aged 69) Buenos Aires, Argentina
- Party: PJ

Jorge Coscia (26 August 1952 – 7 October 2021) was an Argentine filmmaker and politician. A member of the Justicialist Party, he served in the Argentine Chamber of Deputies from 2005 to 2009 and was Secretary of Culture from 2009 to 2014.
