= Farmer baronets =

Extinct baronetcy

Escutcheon of the Farmer baronets of Mount Pleasant

The Farmer baronetcy, of Mount Pleasant in the County of Sussex, was a title in the Baronetage of Great Britain. It was created on 19 January 1780 for George Farmer, in honour of his late father, Captain George Farmer, who was killed when commanding HMS Quebec in the naval action of 6 October 1779 against French ships off Ushant. The title became extinct on the death of the 5th Baronet in 1916.

== Farmer baronets, of Mount Pleasant (1780) ==
- Sir George William Farmer, 1st Baronet (c. 1762–1814)
- Sir George Richard Farmer, 2nd Baronet (1788–1855)
- Sir George Farmer, 3rd Baronet (1829–1883)
- Sir George Richard Hugh Farmer, 4th Baronet (1873–1891)
- Sir Richard Harry Kenrick Farmer, 5th Baronet (1841–1916)

Baronetage of Great Britain
Preceded by Basset baronets	Farmer baronets of Mount Pleasant; 19 January 1780	Succeeded by Barker baronets
