= George Farmer (Royal Navy officer) =

Royal Navy officer (1732–1779)

Captain George Farmer
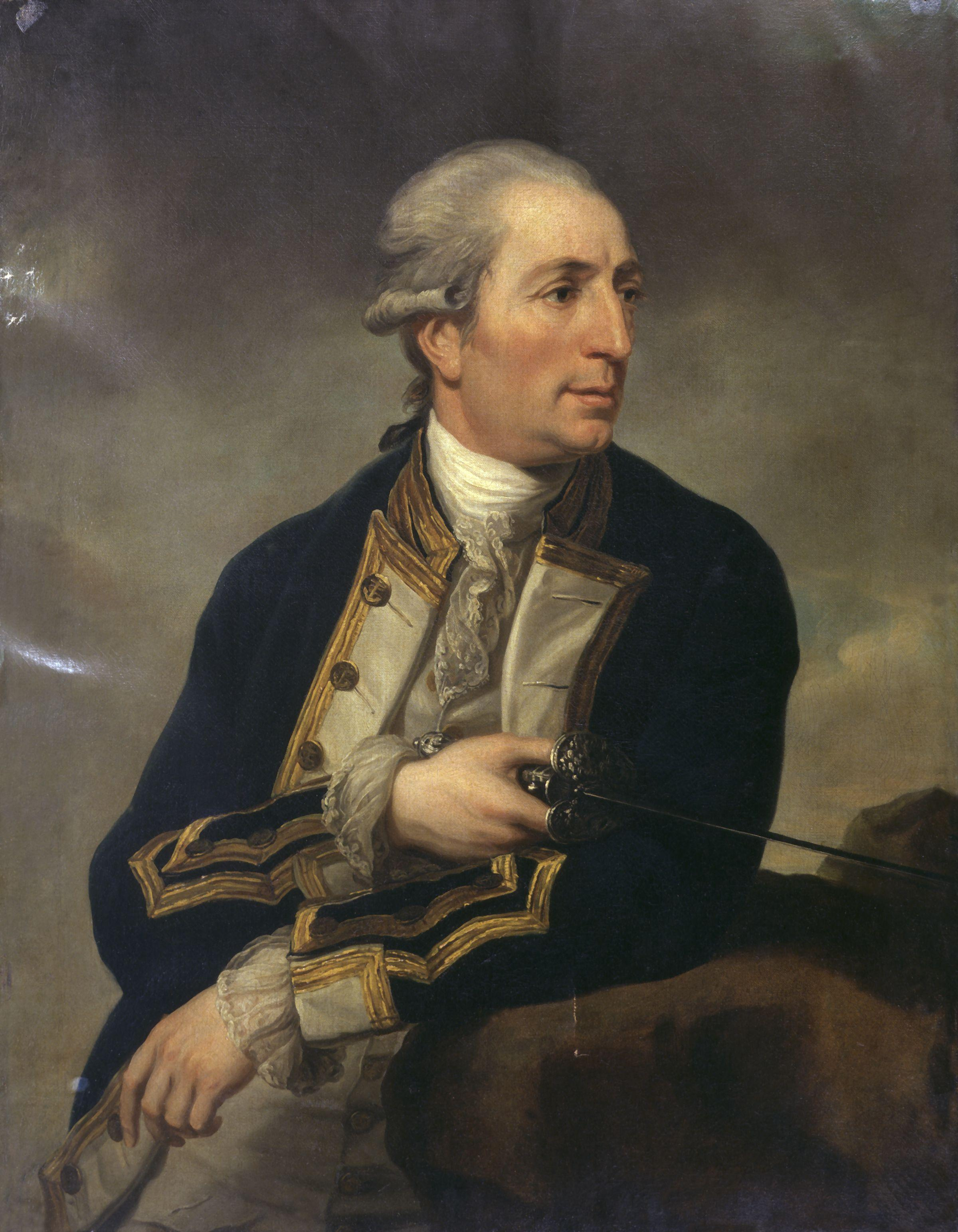
- Portrait by Charles Grignion the Younger, 1778
- Born: 1732; Youghal, County Cork
- Died: October 6, 1779 (aged 46–47); Aboard HMS Quebec
- Military career
- Allegiance: Kingdom of Great Britain
- Branch: Royal Navy
- Service years: 1755–1779
- Rank: Captain
- Commands: HMS Weazle; HMS Swift; Governor of the Falkland Islands; HMS Tamar; HMS Launceston; HMS Seahorse; HMS Quebec
- Conflicts: Seven Years' War; Falklands Crisis; American War of Independence; Action of 6 October 1779 †

Captain George Farmer (1732 – 6 October 1779) was a Royal Navy officer who served in the Seven Years' War and American War of Independence. He was killed while in command of HMS Quebec at the action of 6 October 1779.

== Early life ==
Farmer was son of John Farmer, of a Northamptonshire family settled at Youghal in Ireland. He went to sea at an early age in the merchant service, and afterwards, entering the navy, served as a midshipman of the 60-gun HMS Dreadnought with Captain Maurice Suckling in the West Indies, and aboard HMS Achilles, on the home station, with the Hon. Samuel Barrington. In May 1759 he was promoted to be lieutenant of the frigate HMS Aurora, in which he served until January 1761 on the home station.

He was then placed on half-pay, and settled for the time in Norwich, where he had been previously employed on the impress service, and where he now married. In 1766 he is said to have given assistance in suppressing a riot there, and to have been promoted to the rank of commander in May 1768, in consequence of the representations of the local magistrates.

== In command ==
He had, however, no active employment till September 1769, when he was appointed to command the 14-gun sloop HMS Swift. In her he went out to the Falkland Islands, where, on his arrival in the following March, he found that the Spanish, having established themselves at Puerto Soledad, had sent to Port Egmont, peremptorily ordering the English to quit the settlement, precipitating the Falklands Crisis. As there was no English force to resist any aggression, the senior officer, Captain Hunt, decided to go to England with the news, leaving Farmer in command.

A few days later Swift sailed for a cruise round the islands; but in a gale was blown over to the coast of Patagonia, and in attempting to go into Port Desire struck on a rock, and was lost. The crew escaped to the shore, but being entirely destitute Farmer despatched the cutter to Port Egmont with orders to the only remaining ship, HMS Favourite, to come to their relief.

On 16 April they arrived safely at Port Egmont. On 4 June a Spanish frigate anchored in the harbour; she was presently followed by four others, and the commandant wrote to Farmer that, having with him fourteen hundred troops and a train of artillery, he was in a position to compel the English to quit, if they hesitated any longer. Farmer replied that he should defend himself to the best of his power; but when the Spaniards landed, Farmer, after firing his guns, capitulated on terms, an inventory of the stores being taken, and the English permitted to return to their own country in Favourite.

After arriving in September, Farmer, on being acquitted of all blame for the loss of Swift, was appointed to the 16-gun sloop HMS Tamar, and a few months later, January 1771, was promoted to post rank. In August 1773 he was appointed to the 24-gun HMS Seahorse, and sailed for the East Indies, having among his petty officers Thomas Troubridge, a master's mate, and Horatio Nelson, a midshipman.

== Death in action ==
On returning to England after an uneventful commission, Farmer was appointed in March 1778 to the 32-gun HMS Quebec, in which he was employed during the year in convoy service in the North Sea. In 1779 he was stationed chiefly at Guernsey as a guard for the Channel Islands, and to gain intelligence. It was thus that as early as 18 June he sent over news that the French fleet had sailed from Brest, that the Spanish fleet had sailed from Cádiz, and that there were at Le Havre great preparations for an invading force.

On 6 July he wrote that he had driven on shore and destroyed a convoy of forty-nine small vessels, with a 20-gun frigate and several armed vessels; but that Quebec herself had struck heavily on the rocks, and he had been obliged to throw his guns overboard. This necessitated his going to Portsmouth for repairs, and when these were finished, as there were no 12-pounders to replace the lost guns, he had to be supplied with 9-pounders, which were taken from another frigate not ready for sea.

With this reduced armament, off Ushant, on 6 October, Quebec met the French 32-gun 12-pounder frigate Surveillante, carrying nearly double the number of men. A sharp action ensued; after about three hours and a half both ships were dismasted; but Quebec's sails that had fallen over the guns caught fire, and the frigate was speedily in a blaze. There was little wind and a great swell; Surveillante, completely disabled, was at some little distance; the cutter HMS Rambler was to leeward, and also dismasted; and the French cutter L'Expédition, which had been engaged with Rambler, had sought safety in flight. It was thus impossible to help the burning frigate, which after some four or five hours blew up. Sixty-six only out of about 195 that were on board were picked up by the boats of Surveillante, of Rambler, and of a Russian vessel that came on the scene; the rest, including Captain Farmer, perished.

== Family ==
Farmer had been previously wounded, and his conduct both in the action and during the fire was admired. At the special request of the Board of Admiralty, a baronetcy was conferred on his eldest son, then 17 years of age; also a pension of £200 a year to his widow, Rebecca, the daughter of Captain William Fleming of the Royal Navy, and of £25 per annum to each of eight children, and a ninth not yet born.
