= Charles Grignion =

Charles Grignion is the name of:

- Charles Grignion the Elder (1721–1810), British engraver and draughtsman
- Charles Grignion the Younger (1754–1804), British painter and engraver
