= HMS Swift (1763) =

Sloop of the Royal Navy

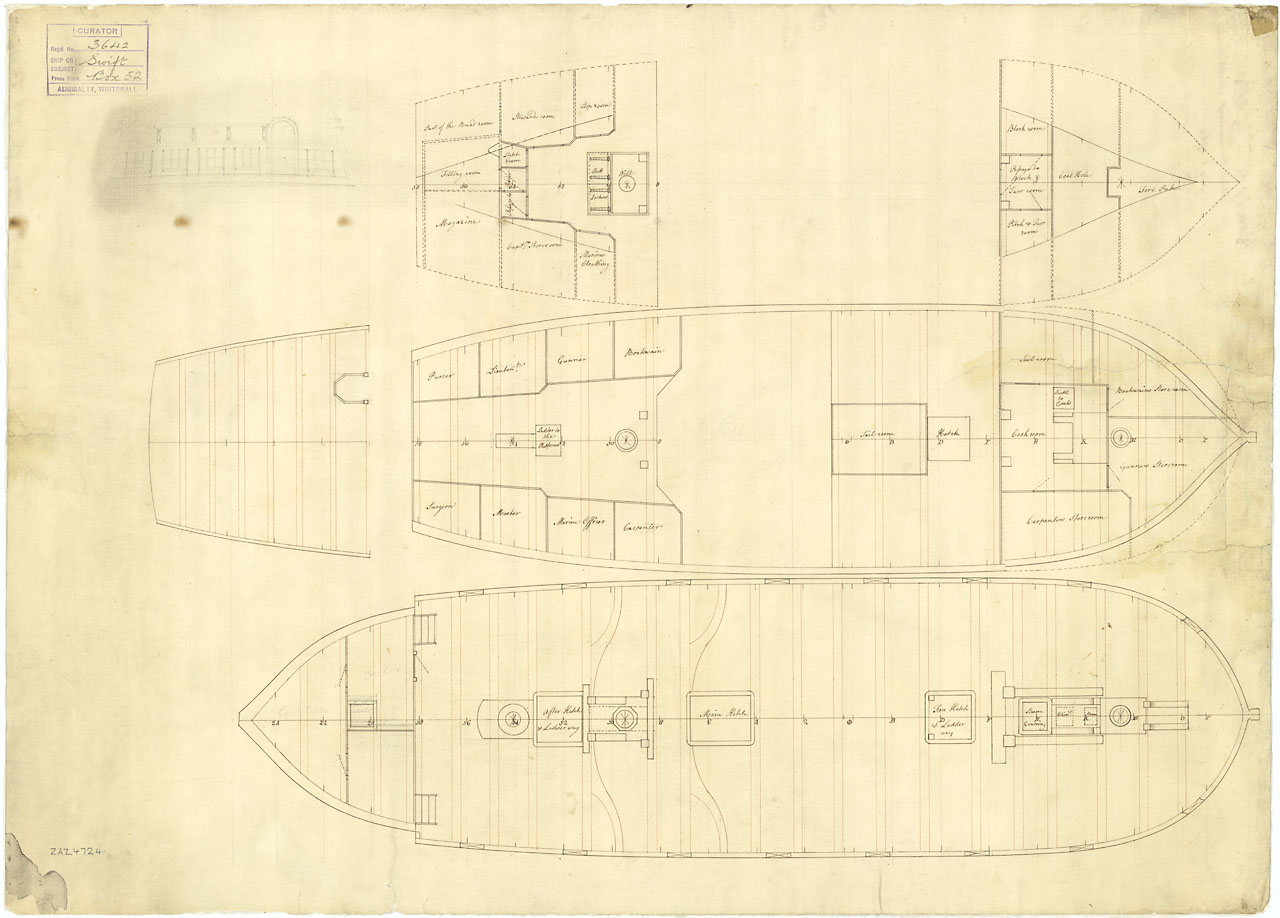
Swift drawn in 1763

HMS Swift was built in 1762 at the shipyard of John Greave in Limehouse, on the banks of the River Thames, and launched in 1763. It was a sloop-of-war 28 metres (92 ft) in length and was armed with 14 6 pounders (2.7 kg) guns and 12 swivel guns of 1/2 pound. It sank along the coast of Puerto Deseado, Patagonia in 1770.

The discovery of HMS Swift in Puerto Deseado in 1982 represented the beginning of underwater archaeology in Argentina.

== Ship ==
HMS Swift was a sloop-of-war 28 metres (92 ft) in length and was armed with 14 6 pounders (2.7 kg) guns and 12 pedreros of 1/2 pound.

== Wreck ==
Based at Port Egmont in the Falkland Islands, Swift undertook an exploratory trip along the Patagonian coasts before the winter of 1770. A storm forced them to stop near the site of present-day Puerto Deseado to rest and dry their clothes. Entering the Río Deseado, they ran aground on a submerged rock and, although after getting rid of much of the cargo, they managed to free the ship, minutes later they came across a second uncharted rock. At 18:00 on 13 March 1770, Swift sank along the coast of Puerto Deseado. Three of the ninety-one crew members (the cook and two soldiers) died. The cook's body appeared days later and he was buried after an impromptu funeral.

At the time of the wreck, the ship was under the command of Captain George Farmer. The ship was commissioned to defend the base of Port Egmond, and at the time was embarked on an exploratory voyage of South America.

== Archaeological exploration ==
The discovery of HMS Swift in Puerto Deseado represented the beginning of underwater archaeology in Argentina. The ship was found by young amateur divers on 2 February 1982; the remains of one of the lost soldiers was found and buried ashore. The ships wreckage became part of the impulse that led to the first national laws regarding underwater archaeology in the country. Investigations into the wreckage were primarily done by the National Institute of Anthropology and Latin American Thought (INAPL).
