= Secretariat of Culture (Argentina) =

- Secretaría de Cultura
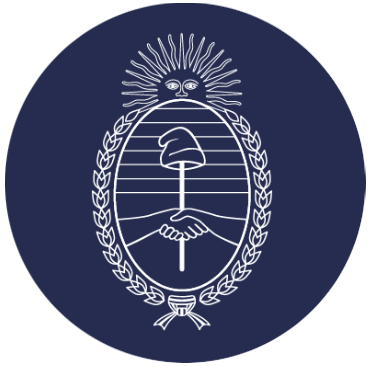

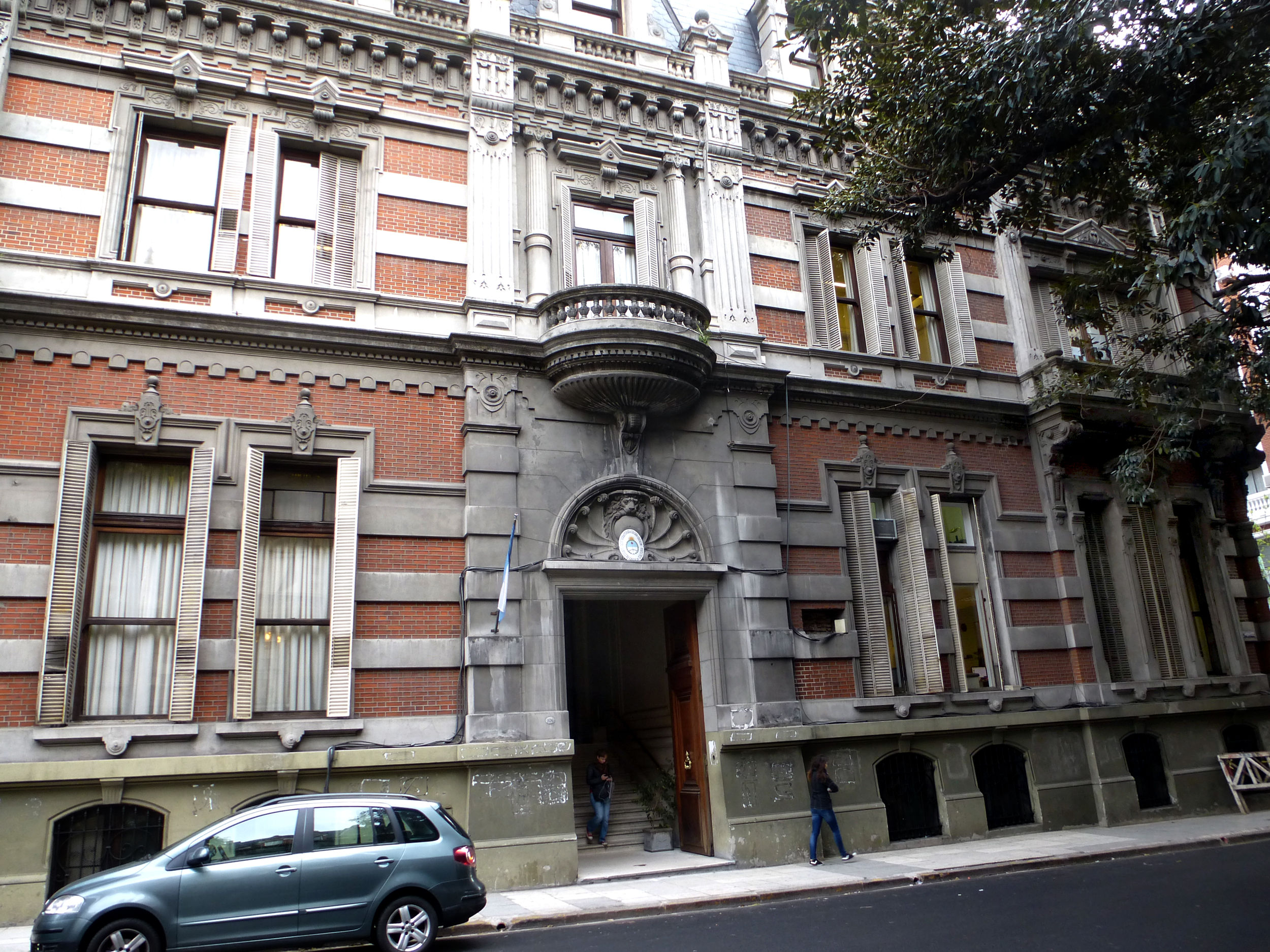
- Palacio Casey, headquarters

Secretariat overview
- Formed: 1973; 53 years ago
- Superseding Secretariat: Ministry of Human Capital
- Jurisdiction: Government of Argentina
- Headquarters: Palacio Casey, Buenos Aires
- Annual budget: $ 9,134,481,604 (2021)
- Secretariat executive: Leonardo Cifelli, Secretariat
- Child agencies: INAPL
- Website: argentina.gob.ar/cultura

The Secretariat of Culture (Spanish: Secretaría de Cultura, formerly Ministry of Culture) of Argentina is a ministry of the national executive power that oversaw the government's public policy on the culture of Argentina.

The culture portfolio was first established in 1973 during the presidency of Héctor Cámpora as part of the responsibilities of the Ministry of Culture and Education; the first minister responsible was Jorge Taiana. The ministry existed only briefly before being demoted to a Secretariat. It would remain under the scope of the broader Ministry of Education until 2014, when it was re-established by President Cristina Fernández de Kirchner.

After president Javier Milei dissolved the Ministry of Culture in December 2023, it turned into a secretariat.

== History ==
The culture portfolio was first established as the Ministry of Culture and Education on 25 May 1973 upon the accession to the presidency of Héctor Cámpora; the first minister responsible was the physician and Justicialist Party politician Jorge Alberto Taiana. Taiana remained in office through the resignation of Cámpora, the interim presidency of Raúl Lastiri, the brief third presidency of Juan Domingo Perón and part of the presidency of Isabel Perón, and was succeeded by Oscar Ivanissevich in 1974.

During the last military dictatorship (1976–1983) the issue of culture and education was left, for the most part, in the hands of civilians. Upon the return of democracy in 1983, President Raúl Alfonsín mandated the creation of the Secretariat of Culture as a dependency of the Ministry of Education and Justice; the first Secretary was Carlos Gorostiza.

In 2014, President Cristina Fernández de Kirchner announced the establishment of a ministry dedicated exclusively to culture, with singer-songwriter Teresa Parodi being appointed to the new position. The ministry was again demoted to a Secretariat under the Ministry of Education with the cabinet reorganization imposed by President Mauricio Macri in September 2018, but this was undone by the administration of President Alberto Fernández after it assumed power in 2019.

== Attributions ==
The attributions and responsibilities of the Ministry of Culture are specified in Article 23, section 5 of the current Law on Ministries (Ley de Ministerios), published in 2019. According to this law, the Ministry was in charge of assisting the President of Argentina and the Chief of the Cabinet of Ministers in all matters pertaining to culture, as well as designing and executing public policy, planning, programs and projects to stimulate and favor culture; elaborating and promoting policies that strengthen Argentina's cultural identities, promoting policies destined to the development of the economic activity of the cultural industry, directing policies of conservation and protection of Argentina's cultural heritage, promoting policies that safeguard cultural diversity, among others.

=== Structure and dependencies ===
The Secretariat of Culture has a number of centralized and decentralized dependencies. The centralized dependencies, as in other government ministers, are known as secretariats (secretarías) and undersecretariats (subsecretarías); there are currently three of these:

- Secretariat of Cultural Development (Secretaría de Desarrollo Cultural)
- Secretariat of Cultural Administration (Secretaría de Gestión Cultural)
- Secretariat of Cultural Heritage (Secretaría de Patrimonio Cultural)

The Secretariat of Cultural Heritage, through the National Directorate of Museums, is tasked with overseeing and maintaining all of Argentina's national museums, such as the National Museum of Fine Arts, the National Historical Museum, the Sarmiento Historical Museum, the National Bicentennial House, the Historical House of Independence, the National Cabildo Museum, among others. In addition, a number of decentralized institutions depend on the Ministry of Culture, such as the National Library of the Argentine Republic, the National Institute of Cinema and Audiovisual Arts (INCAA), the National Institute of Anthropology and Latin American Thought (INAPL) and the National Institute of Music.

=== Cultural centres and venues ===
- Borges Cultural Centre
- Cervantes Theatre
- Libertad Palace
- Tecnópolis

== Headquarters ==
The secretariat is headquartered in the Casey Palace, a residential manor originally built for the Irish Argentine businessman Eduardo Casey. The building was designed by the United States-born architect Carlos Ryder and finished in 1889. It is located at the intersection of Alvear Avenue and Rodríguez Peña street, in the Buenos Aires barrio of Recoleta.

== List of ministers and secretaries ==
No.	Minister	Party	Term	President
Ministry of Culture and Education (1973–1981)
1	Jorge Taiana	PJ	May – Jul 1973	Héctor Cámpora
2	Carlos Burundarena	Independent	Mar – Dec 1981	Roberto Viola
Ministry of Culture (2014–2023)
3	Teresa Parodi	Independent	7 May 2014 – 10 December 2015	Cristina Fernández
4	Pablo Avelluto	PRO	10 December 2015 – 5 September 2018	Mauricio Macri
5	Tristán Bauer	Independent	10 December 2019 – 10 December 2023	Alberto Fernández
Secretariat of Culture (2023–)
6	Leonardo Cifelli	Independent	27 December 2023 –	Javier Milei
