= INAPL =

Argentine anthropological and cultural institute

National Institute of Anthropology and Latin American Thought
- Instituto Nacional de Antropología y Pensamiento Latinoamericano

Agency overview
- Formed: 1943; 82 years ago
- Jurisdiction: Government of Argentina
- Headquarters: Buenos Aires
- Agency executive: Leonor Acuña, Director
- Parent department: Secretariat of Culture
- Website: inapl.cultura.gob.ar

The National Institute of Anthropology and Latin American Thought (Spanish: Instituto Nacional de Antropología y Pensamiento Latinoamericano, abbrevriated INAPL) is an Argentine government agency dedicated to preserving national cultural and archeological heritage. It is a part of Secretariat of Culture.

The institute has been involved in multiple projects. Among these are the preservation of rock art sites including Cueva de las Manos and the study of HMS Swift, a British ship that sank off the coast of Puerto Deseado in 1770. It also runs the National Museum of Man in Argentina.

== Organization ==
The INAPL is a government agency of Argentina, and is part of the Argentina's secretariat of culture.

== Mission and function ==
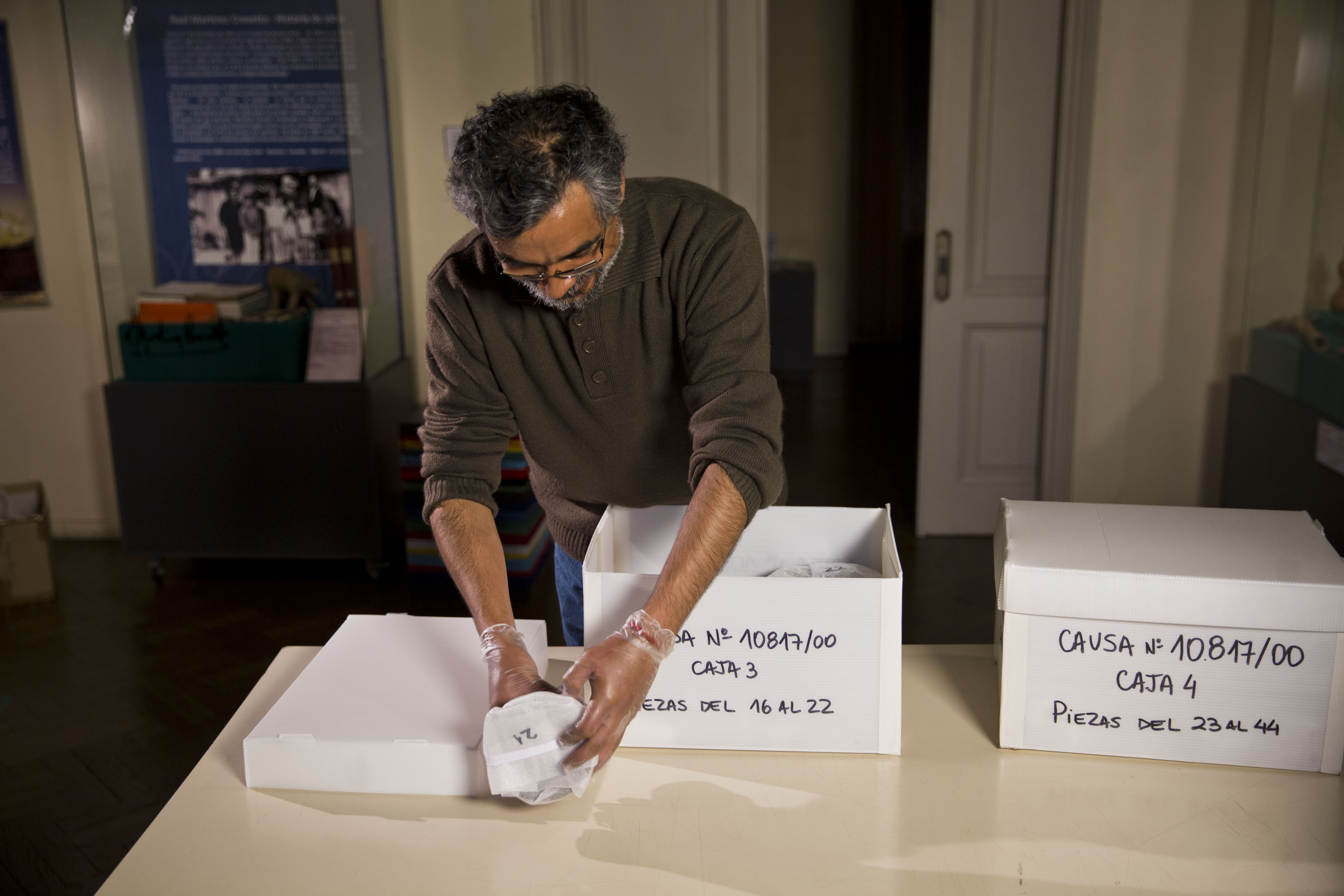
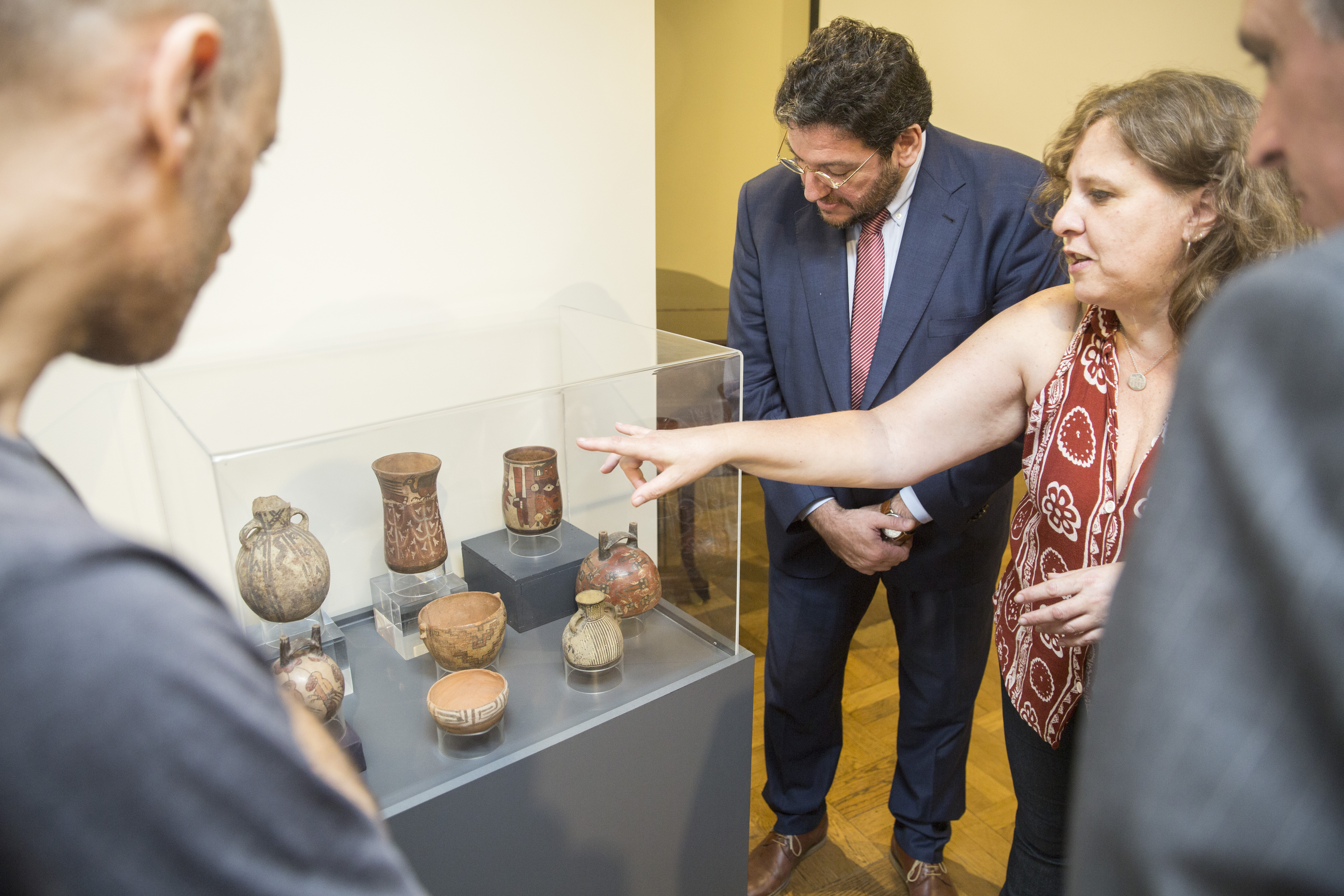
Left to right: Archaeological artifacts at the INAPL; restitution of artifacts by the INAPL

The INAPL is dedicated to preserving national cultural and archeological heritage. As such, the primary focus of the institute is the documentation, preservation, and recovery of cultural heritage, be it physical or non-physical. The institute carries out research in the areas of archaeology, anthropology, and folklore. In keeping with their mission, they also give recommendations and alternative proposals on regional economic and socio-cultural development.

One of the programs of the INAPL is to preserve rock art sites and save them from deterioration and destruction. This program has been in place since 1995. Of these sites, Cueva de las Manos has been given top priority.

== History ==
The INAPL was created on December 20, 1943. It was created at the behest of Juan Alfonso Carrizo, who would become the institute's first director.

The institute has had several names over the course of its existence; the first of these was The National Institute of Tradition assigned at its founding in 1943. In the words of Briones and Guber, the institute was later renamed for political reasons to "the National Institute of Philology and Folklore in 1955, the National Institute of Folkloric Research in 1960, the National Institute of Anthropology in 1964, and [finally] the National Institute of Anthropology and Latin American Thought in 1992."

== Current and former projects ==
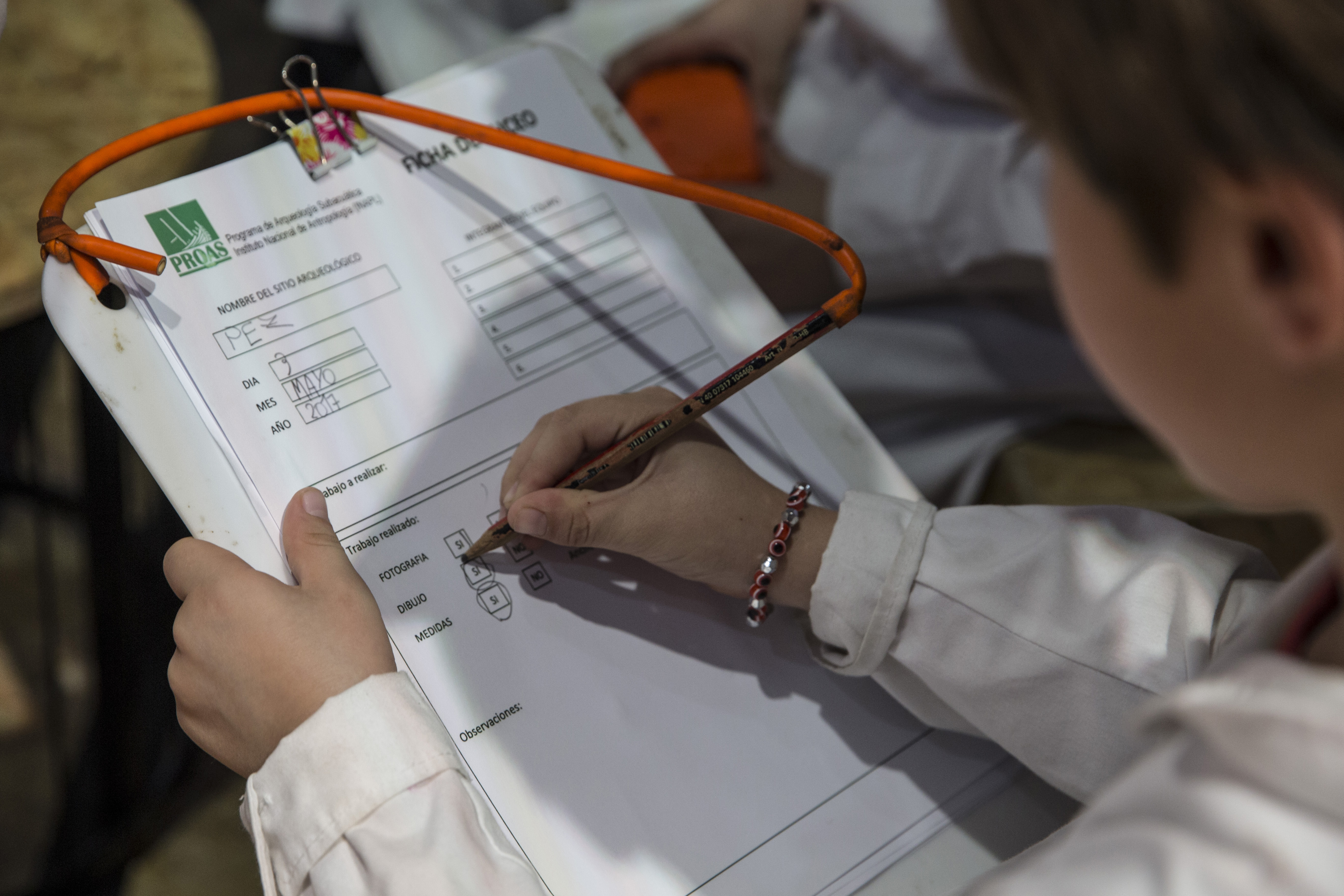
The INAPL's "Underwater Archeology" activity at the 43rd Buenos Aires International Book Fair

Among the institute's current and former projects is the study of HMS Swift (1763), a British ship that sank off of the coast of Puerto Deseado in 1770. The discovery and investigation of the ship was one of the first taken on by the INAPL's newly created underwater archaeology program in Argentina, which was formed in 1995.

The INAPL, along with the National Scientific and Technical Research Council (CONICET), is also a major sponsor of the DocAnt film festival, the oldest currently-running anthropological film festival in Latin America. The INAPL runs the National Museum of Man in Argentina.

== Notable members ==
- Sandra Analía Guillermo—recipient of the John L. Cotter Award in Historical Archaeology

== See also ==
- The National Scientific and Technical Research Council (CONICET)—an Argentine organization that works closely with the INAPL
