= French corvette Expédition (1778) =

Expédition
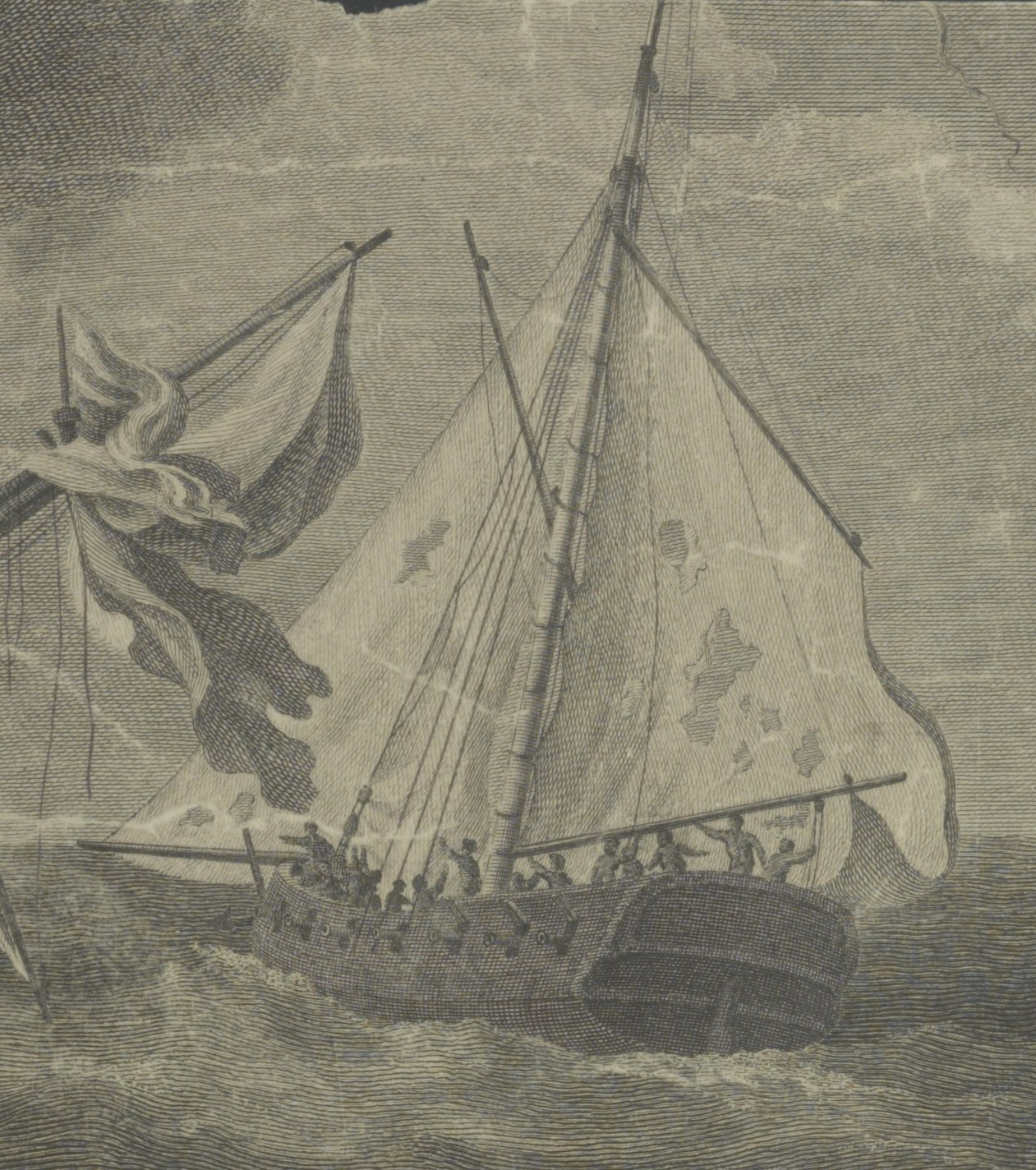
- Expédition

History

Great Britain
- Name: Expedition

France
- Name: Expédition
- Acquired: by capture, July 1778
- Fate: Wrecked off Trinquebar in April 1782

General characteristics
- Complement: 4 to 5 officers; 77 to 90 men
- Armament: 10 to 14 4-pounder guns

Expédition was originally a British civilian 16-gun cutter, either a merchantman or a privateer, that the French captured in July 1778. They brought her into French service as the corvette Expédition.

== French career ==
On 27 October 1778, under M. de la Jaille, Expédition captured a 16-gun British privateer.

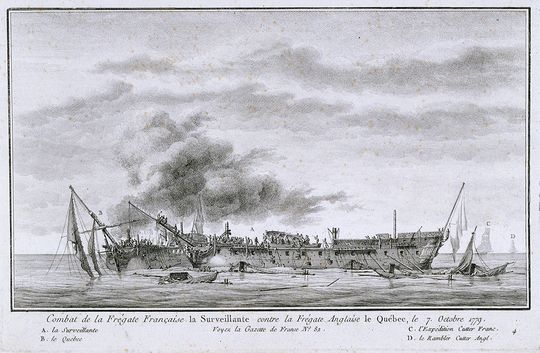
Surveillante vs Quebec. Expédition is indicated with a C on this print of the action

In 1779, Expédition sailed with the frigate Surveillante. She took an incidental part in the action of 6 October 1779, and after the battle, she took Surveillante in tow.

In January 1782, under M. de Langle, Expédition departed Port Louis for a patrol. Off Isle de France, she encountered a strange sail, that she chased under a British false flag. Her quary was in fact the French transport Bethsy, under Captain Roche. Bethsy attempted to flee and seeing her pursuer gaining on him, Roche destroyed letters from Suffren before realising the mistake.

== Fate ==
In April 1782, Expédition was to carry despatches from Navy Minister Castrie and from Bussy-Castelnau to the squadron under Suffren near Nagapattinam. She arrived on the Indian coast and called Tharangambadi, but instead of continuing directly, she started preying on Paraiyar merchantmen. This put her in the course of the British squadron under Hughes, which detected and chased her. Expédition deliberately ran aground between Tharangambadi and Karaikal. Her crew managed to escape, but the despatches were lost.
