= Action of 6 October 1779 =

1779 action of the American Revolutionary War

- Part of the American Revolutionary War
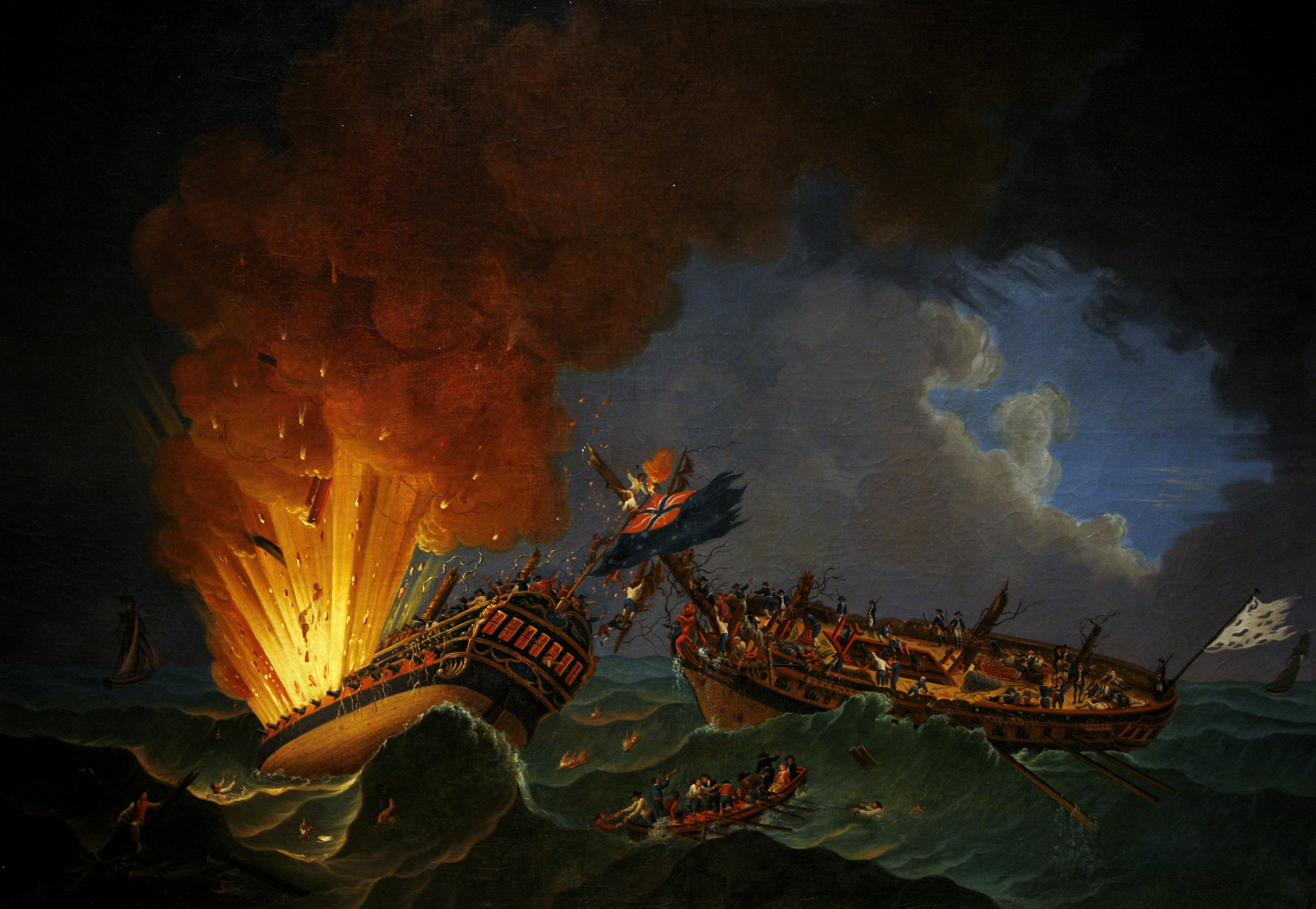
- 1789 painting of the battle
Date	6 October 1779
Location	Off Ushant, Celtic Sea
Result	French victory

Belligerents
France	Great Britain

Commanders and leaders
Charles du Couëdic (DOW)	George Farmer †; Rupert George

Strength
1 frigate 1 cutter	1 frigate 1 cutter

Casualties and losses
30 killed 85 wounded	127 killed or wounded 1 frigate destroyed

The action of 6 October 1779 was a minor but famous and furious naval engagement that took part in the early stages of the war between Britain and France in the American Revolutionary War between the British Royal Navy frigate HMS Quebec and the frigate Surveillante of the French Navy. The battle ended in a French victory when Quebec was destroyed by an explosion.

== Background ==
France along with Spain joined on the side of the Americans and war was declared between France and Britain. Britain did not attempt a close blockade of French ports, rather a screen of frigates kept a vigil while the ships of the line stayed at anchor at places like Torbay and Spithead. One of those frigates, operating off Guernsey, was the thirty-two gun, twelve-pounder frigate HMS Quebec under Captain George Farmer. Quebec had run aground on a submerged rock and had to throw excess weight overboard to refloat her, sacrificing his 12-pound cannon. When repaired in Portsmouth there were no replacements at the time, so ship and crew went back out on station armed with only nine pounders.

On 6 October, Quebec working with the cutter HMS Rambler of ten guns spotted a frigate and a cutter. By 8:00 am they were found to be the French Iphigénie-class, 32-gun Surveillante, under captain Couëdic de Kergoaler and the cutter Expédition.

Portraits of the commanders
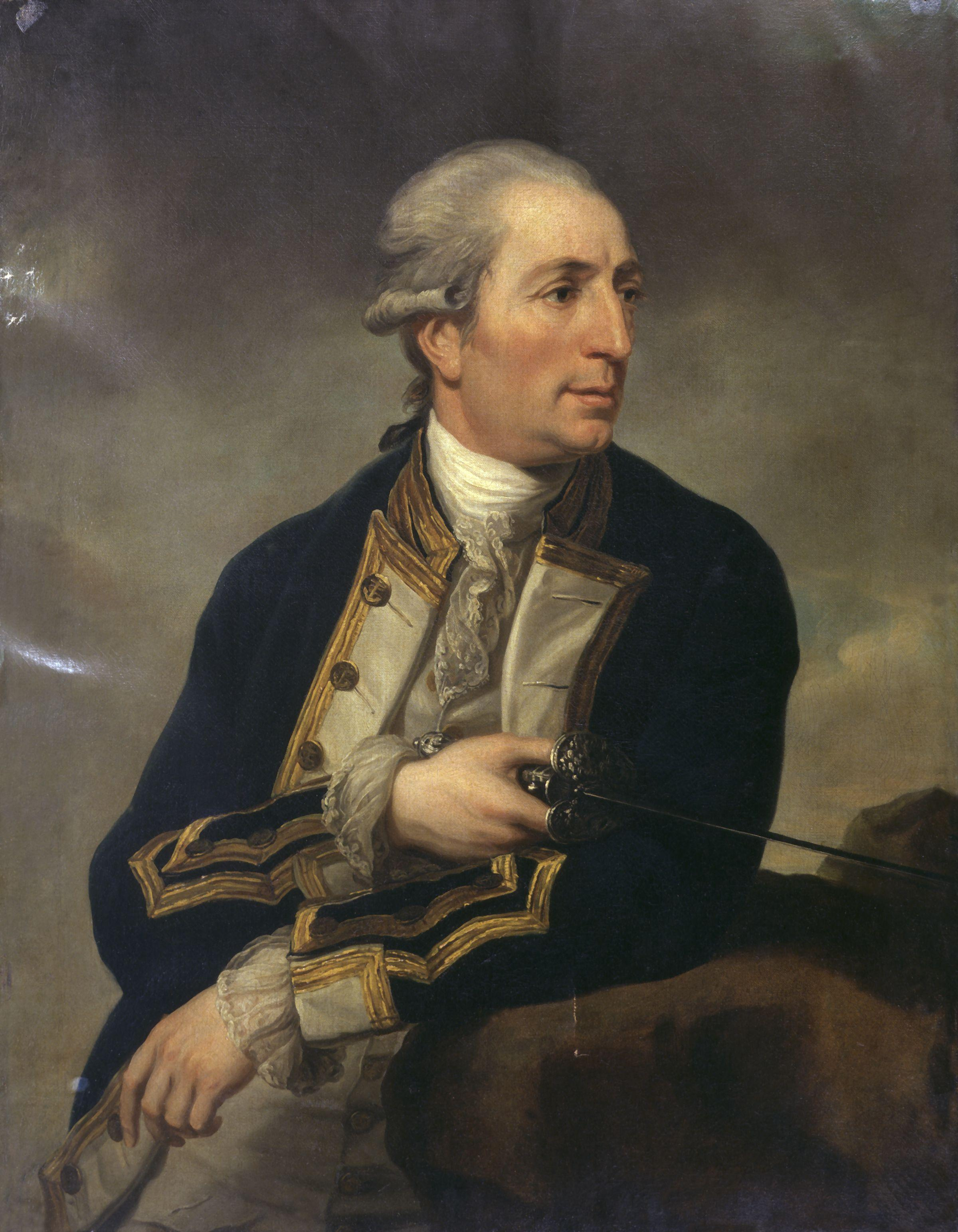
A portrait of George Farmer by Charles Grignion the Younger

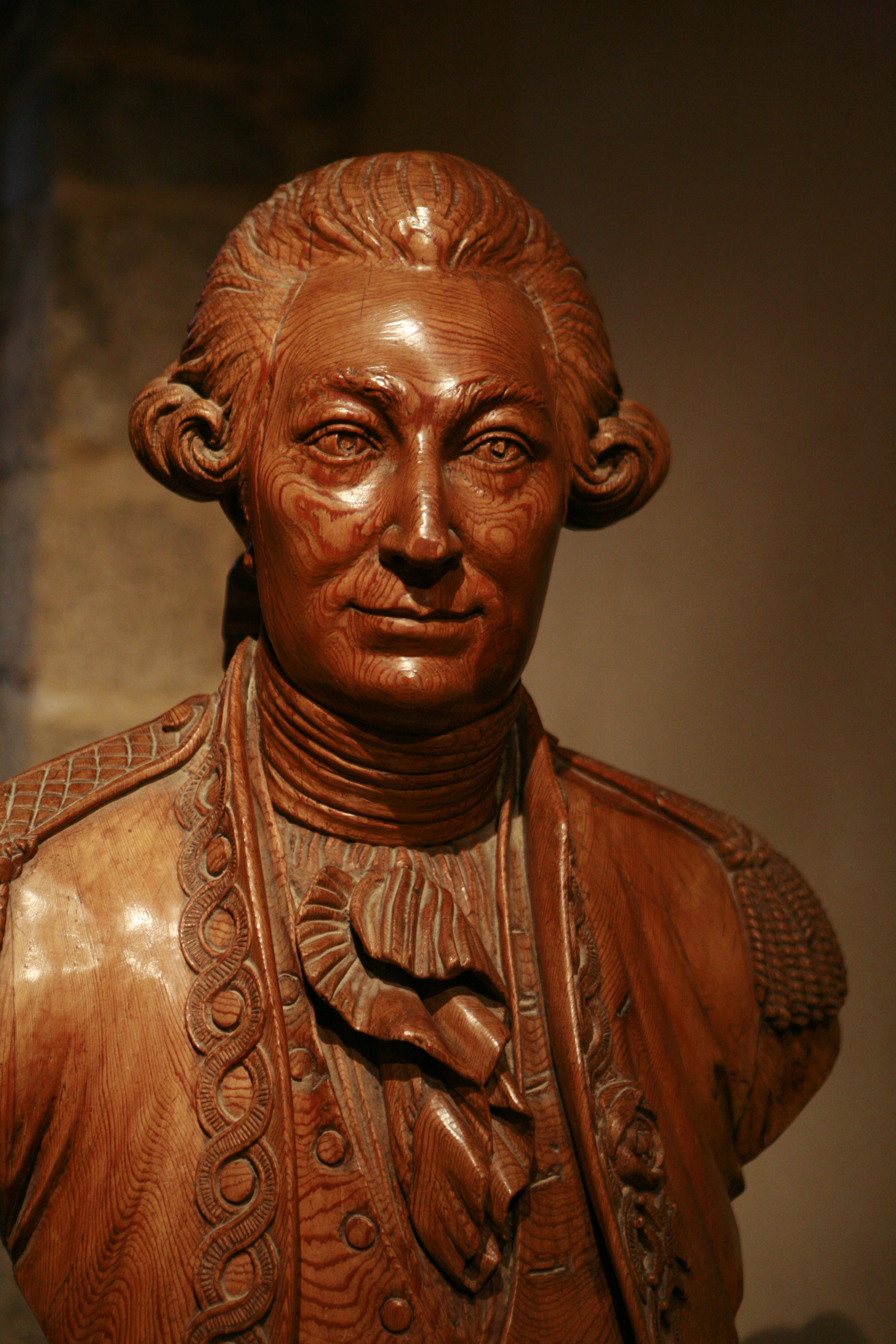
A carving of Charles du Couëdic in the Musée national de la Marine at Brest

== Engagement ==
Quebec cleared for action and by 8:30 in the light wind the French frigate had opened fire. Within an hour Quebec opened fire after she became parallel with Surveillante. Initially Quebec had the upper hand but Surveillante matched Quebec's every move, and from 10 am until 1 pm both sides battered each other furiously. Soon casualties and damages to the respective ships began to take their toll. Farmer was wounded as was the first lieutenant who had to have his arm amputated after part of it was shot away and remarkably soon went back to duty. Couëdic was wounded twice within two hours but not seriously when all of Surveillante's masts and rigging progressively crashed down. Quebec seeing an opportunity was about to finish the French ship but her severely damaged and weakened masts all came down within a space of a half an hour. Quebec's main and foremasts went over the disengaged side, but the mizzen mast came down on the engagement side blocking many of the gunports with the sails and rigging.

The ships drifted together with Surveillante's bowsprit becoming entangled in the wreckage of Quebec's mizzen mast. Quebec's gun captains kept up her rate of fire by shooting through the wreckage. Couëdic saw his opportunity to board and take Quebec but they were repulsed with heavy losses including Couëdic who had now an additional third wound.

By now a stalemate had ensued; both sides' priority was now taken to sorting the damage and casualties were heavy. However, a turn of events began: a fire had begun on Quebec's mangled and tangled sails covering the gun ports, as a result of cannon fire. The fire soon spread out of control and soon took a hold of Surveillante. Couëdic though managed to break free of Quebec by chopping off the wreckage that entangled both ships, and the fire on the French ship was brought under control. However, on Quebec the situation was serious; the fire had spread within the ship itself and had become totally uncontrollable. Farmer ordered the magazine to be flooded but this was now futile, and by 6 pm the fire reached the magazine. British sailors jumped into the water as some knew the inevitable would happen. Farmer ordered the ship to be abandoned and panic ensued. Within moments Quebec exploded taking whatever was left of her complement including Farmer himself. Surveillante managed to be out of harm's way but was so badly shot up the vessel did not have a boat that was seaworthy and could only throw ropes to those sailors (those that could swim) that managed to get close to her.

The cutters had fought their own separate battle and they too had battered themselves into submission. When Quebec exploded the task of rescuing survivors became a priority; the French cutter Expédition broke off the engagement and helped as best she could. The British cutter Rambler had her sails and rigging so badly damaged she was unable to pursue or even intervene; she sent out a boat instead to help.

== Aftermath ==
One of the difficulties in rescuing the crew was the heavy swell as well as the light wind. Rambler's boat saved a master's mate, two midshipmen and fourteen sailors, while Surveillante saved the First Lieutenant, Second Lieutenant of marines, the surgeon and 36 of the crew. 13 more were saved by a passing Russian ship.

The damage to Surveillante was severe, her hull was leaking and had 30 killed and 85 wounded. British and French sailors then had to work together to keep her afloat, and in that they were successful. She returned to Brest the next day under a jury rig. Couëdic and the rest of the French crew treated the surviving British as castaways found at sea, not as prisoners of war, seeing them repatriated without parole or exchange. Couëdic died of his wounds in January 1780, and was admired for his courage and compassion by both the French and the British. Surveillante took nearly a year for repairs to be complete and went on to fight in American waters and even brought news of the peace in Paris in company with the British frigate Medea in the summer of 1783.

=== Art ===
Numerous paintings and drawings of the battle were made, notably by Auguste-Louis Rossel de Cercy (a key exhibit of the Musée national de la Marine in Paris), by George Carter (of which a print is dedicated to George III, the King of England) and by Robert Dodd.

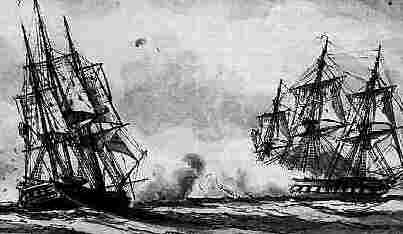
Early part of the engagement. Author unknown

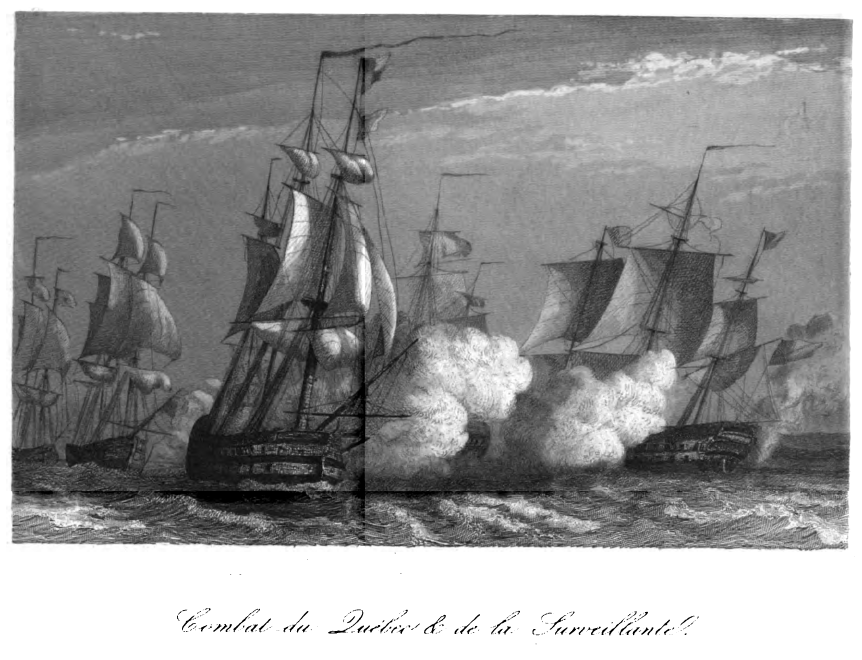
Illustration from La Marine, by Eugène Pacini

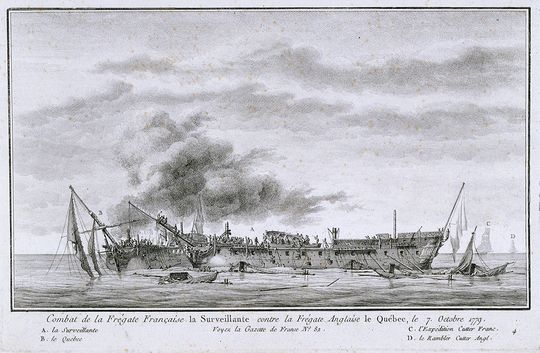
From Voyez la Gazette de France No. 82

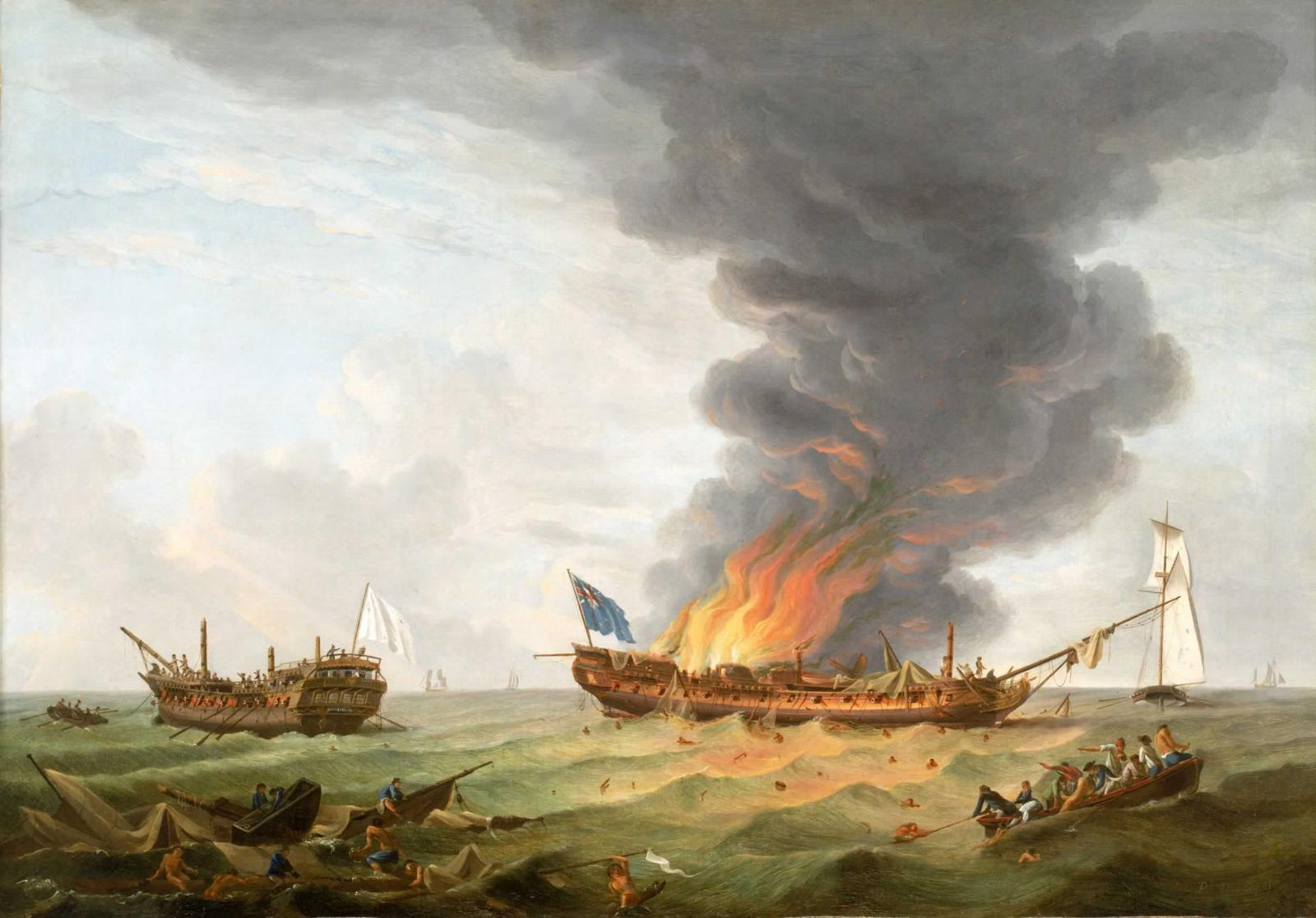
Print by Richard Dodd

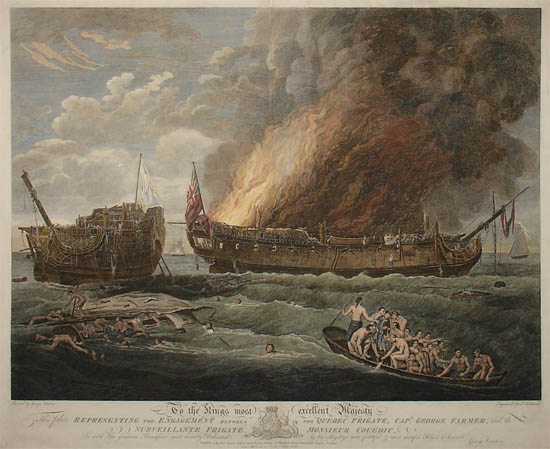
Plate given to George III by George Carter

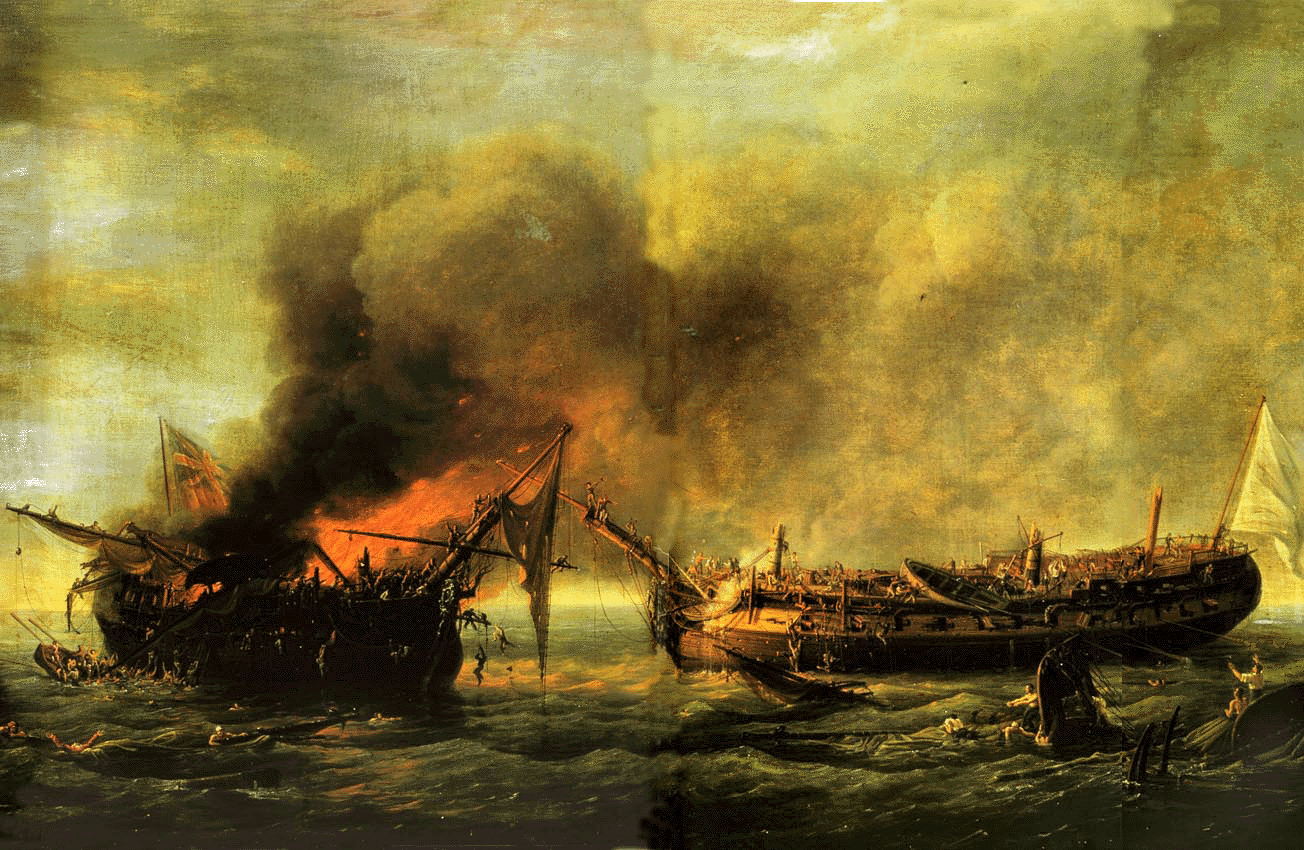
Another painting of the action by Rossel de Cercy

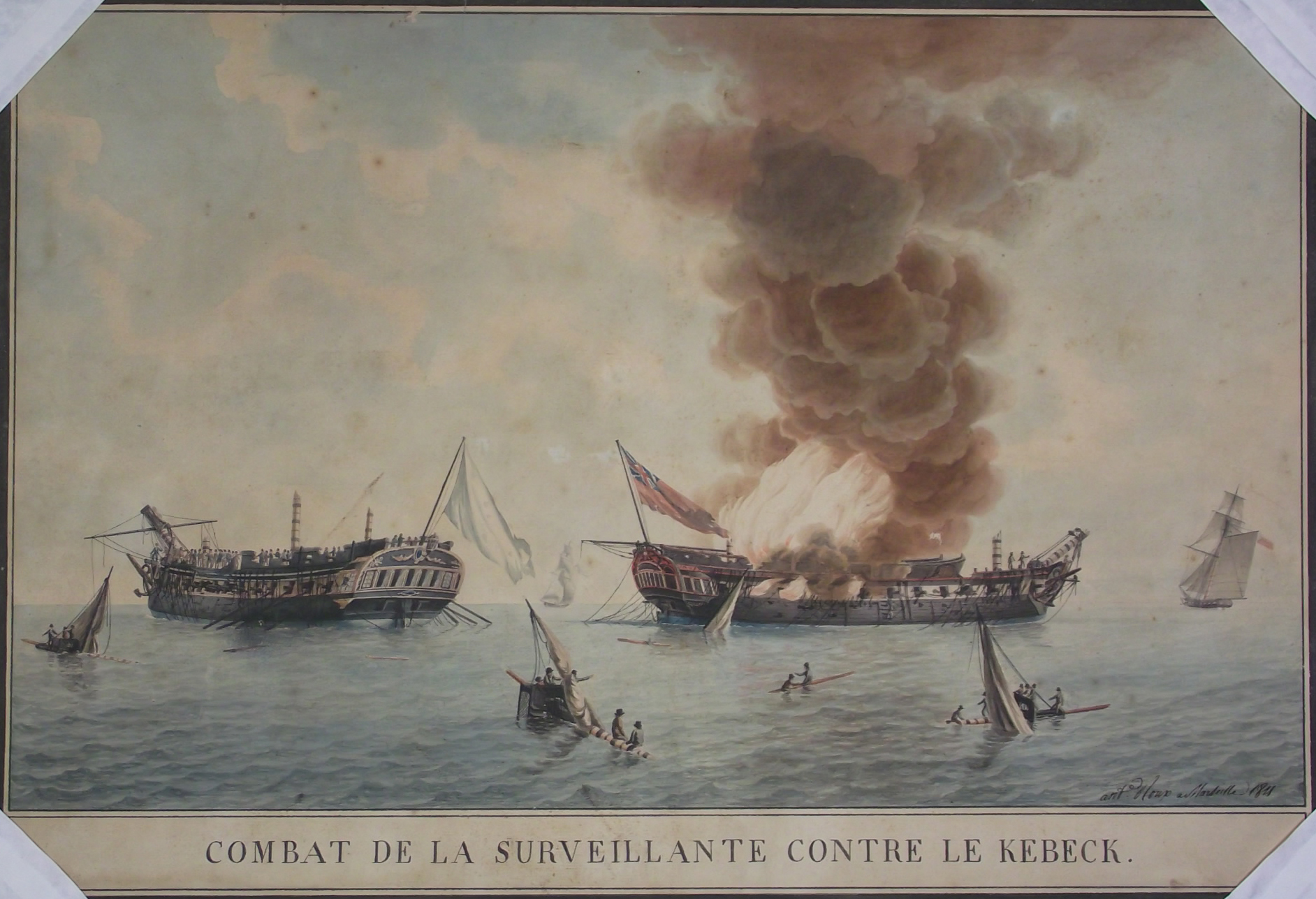
Combat de la Survellante Contre le Kebeck (sic), by Antoine Roux (1811)
