= Charles Grignion the Elder =

British engraver and draughtsman

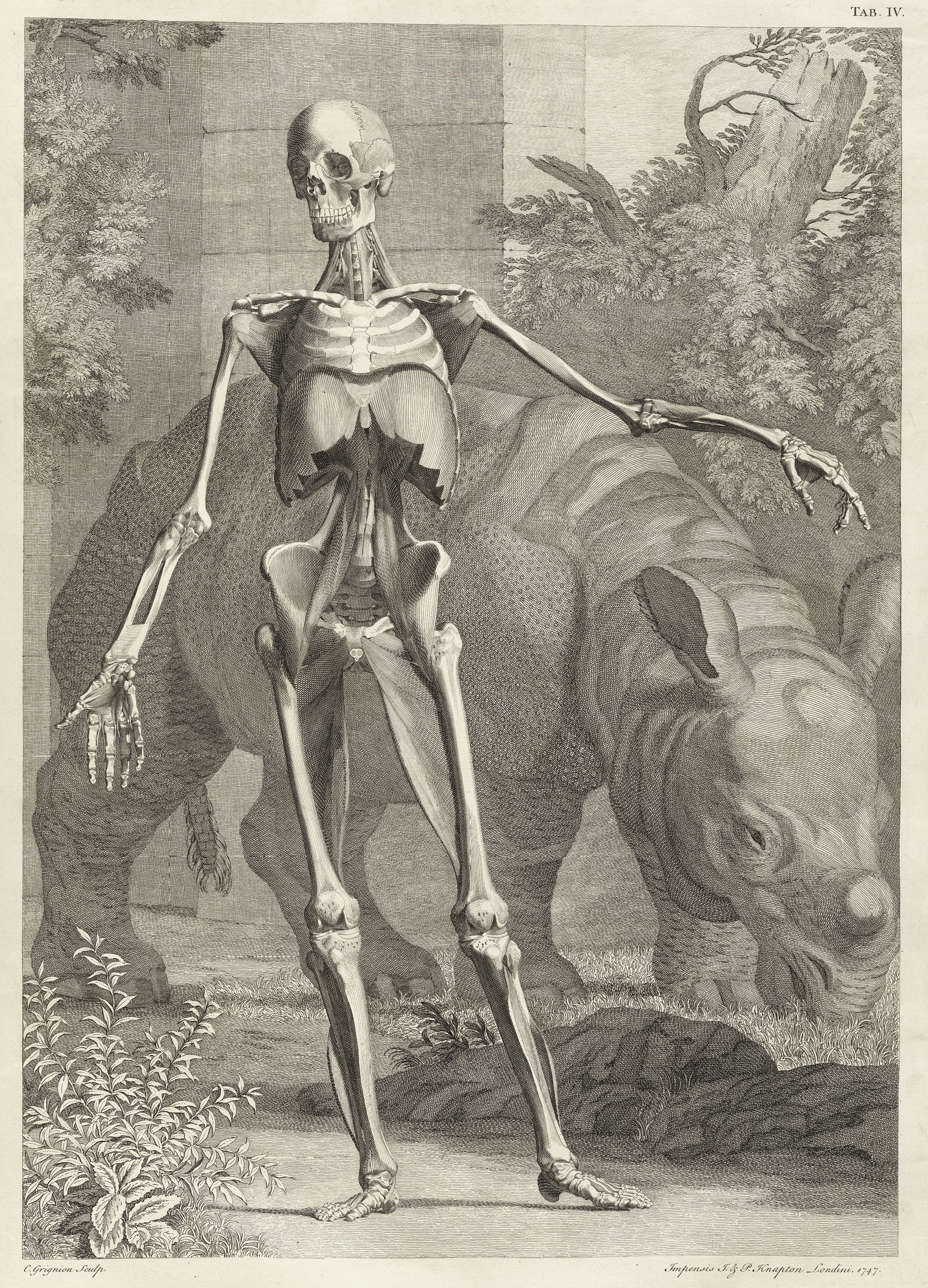
Engraving of Clara and a human skeleton for Tabulae sceleti et musculorum corporis humani, drawn by Jan Wandelaar, engraved by Charles Grignion the Elder, 1749.

Charles Grignion the Elder (1721–1810) was a British engraver and draughtsman.

Grignion was born in London to Huguenot refugees. He was a prolific historical engraver and book illustrator.

He studied in London at Hubert-François Gravelot's school in Covent Garden. He also engraved the earliest record of a cricket match, published in the General Advertiser in 1748.

In 1754, his nephew Charles Grignion the Younger was born. His nephew, in turn, became a history and portrait painter.
