= Rivière à Grignon =

Location
- Country: Canada
- Province: Quebec
- Region: Saguenay-Lac-Saint-Jean
- MRC: Le Domaine-du-Roy
- TNO or Municipality: Lac-Ashuapmushuan, Sainte-Hedwidge et Saint-Prime

Physical characteristics
- Source: Unidentified lake
  - location: Chambord
  - coordinates: 48°22′48″N 72°07′35″W
  - elevation: 284 m (932 ft)
- Mouth: Lac Saint-Jean
  - location: Chambord
  - coordinates: 48°26′30″N 72°06′39″W
  - elevation: 101 m (331 ft)
- Length: 12.4 km (7.7 mi)

Basin features
- Progression: Lac Saint-Jean, Saguenay River
- Tributaries
  - left: (upstream) stream, discharge of two lakes.
  - right: (upstream) stream.

The Rivière à Grignon (English: Grignon's River) is a tributary of lac Saint-Jean, flowing in the municipality of Chambord, in the Le Domaine-du-Roy Regional County Municipality, in the administrative region of Saguenay–Lac-Saint-Jean, in the province of Quebec, to Canada.

The upper part of the Grignon river valley is served by forest roads and Chemin Delaunière which connects by the southeast to route 155; the lower part by Principale Street (route 169).

Generally, forestry is the main economic activity in the upper part of this valley; agriculture is practiced in the lower part.

The surface of the Grignon river is usually frozen from the beginning of December to the end of March, except the rapids; however, traffic on the ice is generally safe from mid-December to mid-March.

== Geography ==
The Grignon river originates from an unidentified lake (length: 1.2 km (0.75 mi); altitude: 284 m (932 ft)). This lake takes the form of a birch leaf. The mouth of Lac Brassard is located southeast of the lake, either:

- 16.6 km (10.3 mi) south-east of downtown Roberval;
- 7.3 km (4.5 mi) south-west of the village center of Chambord;
- 7.3 km (4.5 mi) south of the mouth of the Grignon river.

From its source, the Grignon river flows over 12.4 km (7.7 mi) with a drop of 183 m (600 ft), according to the following segments:

- 1.6 km (0.99 mi) first towards the northwest to the outlet (coming from the northwest) of an unidentified lake;
- 2.4 km (1.5 mi) first towards the east, in particular by crossing Lake Delaunaire (length: 1.8 km (1.1 mi); altitude: 252 m (827 ft)), to its mouth;
- 6.5 km (4.0 mi) first forming a hook towards the east, then the northeast by approaching a curve of the railway, to a stream (coming from the southwest);
- 1.9 km (1.2 mi) to the north in the agricultural zone by crossing the route 169 and the railway, collecting a stream (coming from the southeast), until 'at its mouth.

The Grignon river flows at the bottom of Anse de Chambord, on the southwest shore of lac Saint-Jean. This confluence is located 32.7 km (20.3 mi) southeast of the middle of the entrance to Anse de Chambord (stretching to 2.6 km (1.6 mi) to the east) which is delimited between Pointe de Chambord (to the north) and Pointe aux Pins (to the south). The confluence of the river at Grignon is located at:

- 3.9 km (2.4 mi) south-east of the tip of Pointe-Chambord;
- 3.8 km (2.4 mi) west of the center of the village of Chambord;
- 11.6 km (7.2 mi) south-east of downtown Roberval.

From the mouth of the Grignon river, the current crosses Lac Saint-Jean to the east for 33 km (21 mi) to the northeast, follows the course of the Saguenay River (via the Little Landfill) on 172.3 km (107.1 mi) eastwards to Tadoussac where it merges with the Estuary of Saint Lawrence.

== Toponymy ==
The term "Grignon" is a family name of French origin.

The toponym "Rivière à Grignon" was formalized on September 5, 1985, at the Place Names Bank of the Commission de toponymie du Québec.

== Appendices ==
=== Related articles ===
- Le Domaine-du-Roy Regional County Municipality
- Chambord, a municipality
- Lac Saint-Jean, a body of water
- Saguenay River, a stream
