= Puerto Deseado =

- City
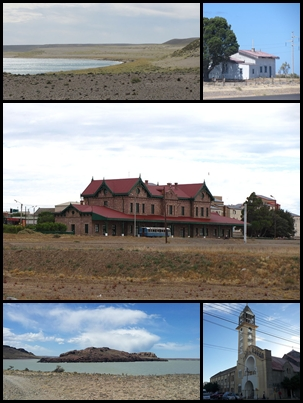
- Sights in Puerto Deseado

- Location of Puerto Deseado in Argentina Puerto Deseado (Argentina)
- Coordinates: 47°45′S 65°55′W
- Country: Argentina
- Province: Santa Cruz
- Department: Deseado

Government
  - Intendant: Juan Raúl Martínez (SER Santa Cruz)

Population (2022 census)
  - Total: 16,747
- Time zone: UTC−3 (ART)
- CPA base: Z9050
- Dialing code: +54 297
- Climate: BSk

Puerto Deseado, originally called Port Desire, is a city and a fishing port of 16,747 inhabitants (at the 2022 Census), which serves as the capital of the Deseado Department in Santa Cruz Province of Argentina, situated on the estuary of the Deseado River.

It was named Port Desire by the privateer Thomas Cavendish in 1586 after the name of his ship, and later became known by the Spanish translation of the name. Today, the straggly town has a couple of pleasant squares, a former railway station and two museums, one with a collection of indigenous artifacts and one at the seafront with relics from the sloop of war HMS Swift which sank in 1770, recovered after its wreck was discovered in the port in 1982. The coast boasts spectacular scenery and colonies of marine wildlife close to the town.

== History ==
The harbour, nearly 32 kilometres (20 mi) long, was discovered in 1520 during the first circumnavigation of the world by the Magellan-Elcano Spanish expedition. Other Spanish expeditions followed, including the Loaísa expedition (1525) or the Pedro Sarmiento de Gamboa expedition (1579). Sixty six years after the Magellan Elcano expedition, on 17 December 1586, the English privateer Thomas Cavendish sailed into the estuary during his voyage of circumnavigation seeking to raid the Pacific coasts of the Viceroyalty of Peru. His fleet consisted of his flagship, Desire, accompanied by Hugh Gallant and Content. He named the harbour "Port Desire" after his ship, and the point of land at the harbour mouth is still known as Punta Cavendish. They were faced by the Mapuche Tehuelche, who shot arrows that wounded some of the crew. After ten days Cavendish took his ships on their way, and returned to England in 1588. A second attempt by the English to attack or occupy parts of the Spanish Empire resulted in Cavendish leading an expedition in 1591 with five ships, sailing on Leicester Galleon. After raiding Santos in Brazil the fleet suffered problems in the winter at the Strait of Magellan, and some of the boats went to Port Desire. The few surviving men and boats made their way back to England, sailing to the nearby "Penguin Island" then south, but were caught by a storm and, forced to run before the wind, came on unknown islands, making the first probable sighting of the Falkland Islands.

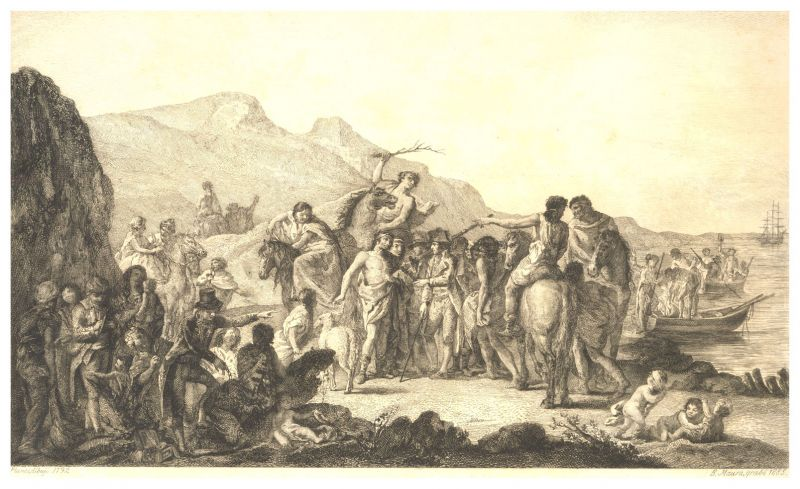
The Malaspina Expedition received by the Mapuche Tehuelche in Puerto Deseado (1789) at Museos de Tenerife.

The English, a rival nation to Spain, tried to occupy Puerto Deseado and the southern part of the Viceroyalty of Peru during the 1670 John Narborough failed expedition.

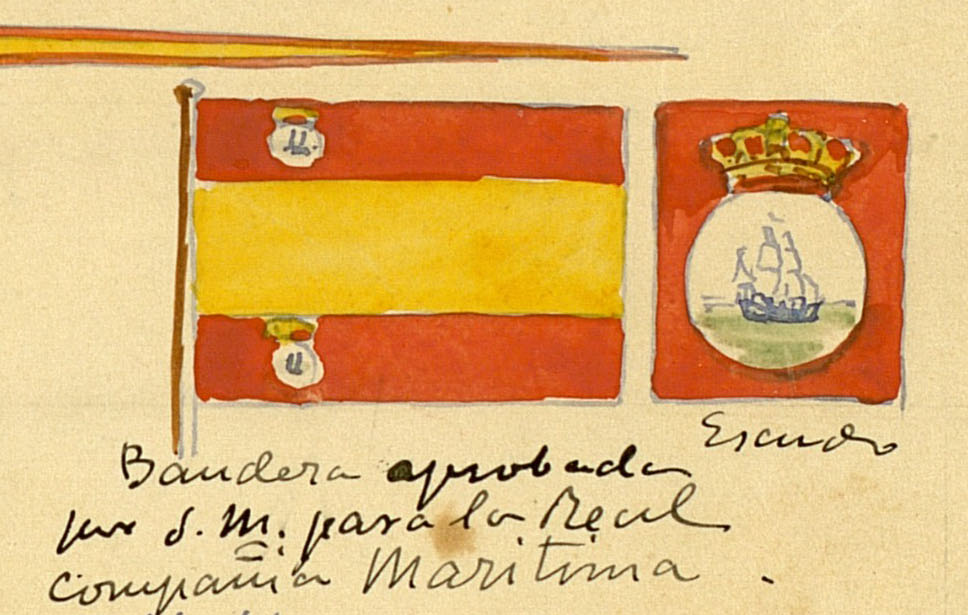
Real Compañía Marítima flag. Founder of Puerto Deseado en 1790

In 1789 the port was visited by both Spanish ships, Atrevida and Descubierta, of the Malaspina Scientific Expedition. On the voyage that was to found Nueva Colonia y Fuerte de Floridablanca, on 20 April 1780 Antonio Viedma made a stop and founded a temporary settlement on the river's south bank. During the seven months it was inhabited, houses, a bread oven, a forge, a hospital for scurvy and a wooden fort were built, and about one hundred people lived there, including the sea men. In 1790, during the viceroyalty of the Río de la Plata times, the Armada forced captain John Byron out of the Falklands. During his escape, the sloop-of-war Swift headed for Port Desire, but was shipwrecked on a concealed rock. In 1790 a village and fort was established at Puerto Deseado by the Real Compañía Marítima (Royal Maritime Company). It was the main headquarters of an array of fishing posts such as the one in isla Pingüinos. It was built with a bread oven, farming land, a hospital, a chapel, fishing and salting facilities, and the Todos los Santos and San Carlos forts, which served as the presidio. The desertion of the villagers, cost of constant supplies and lack of whales in the neighbourhood (only sea lions were found) caused the end of the Real Compañía Marítima, and the last soldiers of the presidio left in 1807 during the British invasions of the River Plate.

At the time of the Argentine Confederation, in 1833, HMS Beagle stopped at the port, with Charles Darwin a member of the crew. The village was founded for the third time in 1882 when Antonio Oneto obtained funds from Hipólito Yrigoyen, Ministry of the Interior, to establish Deseado and Santa Cruz. The new villagers were given farming land, credits and tools.

In 1902 the railway station from the Puerto Deseado Railway was built. During the 1982 Falklands War the "Kettledrum operation" aiming to bomb Deseado was planned, but not carried out.

== Traffic ==
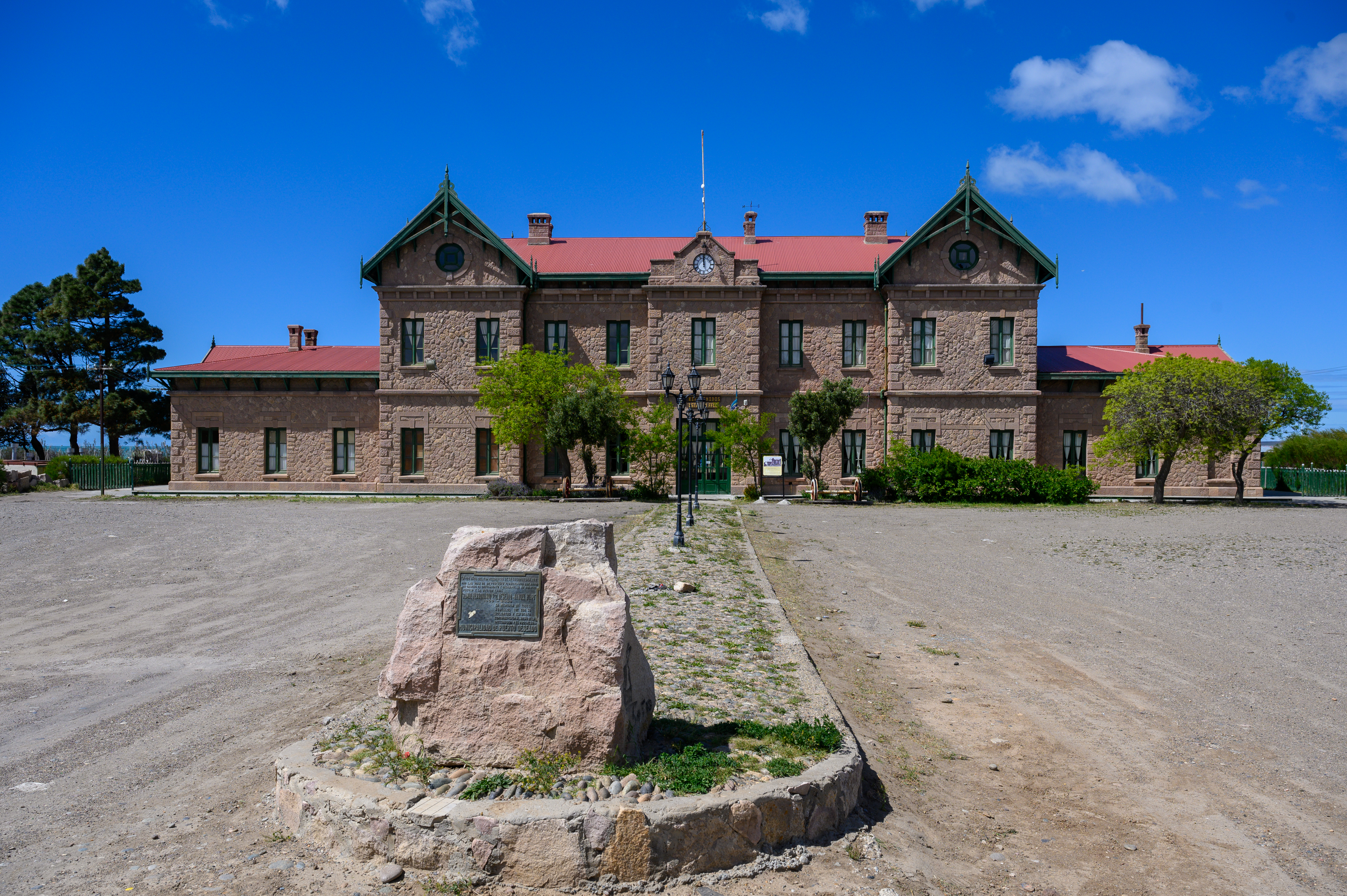
Puerto Deseado's old train station (2019)

The town was serviced by the freight railwayline running form Las Heras via Pico Truncado to Puerto Deseado up until 1976. According to Railway gazette, this line will be modernized shortly for reopening end of 2015 or the beginning of 2016. The town is connected to the national road system via a 120 km long nearly straight secondary road.

== Geography ==
=== Climate ===
Under the Köppen climate classification, Puerto Deseado has a cold semi-desert climate (BSk) with mild, occasionally warm summers and cold winters. Despite the year-round low rainfall, the weather generally remains cloudy, with average temperatures and cloudiness being reminiscent of the British Isles. Due to the effect of more continental inland conditions, occasional excessive heat in summer and harsh frosts in winter occur.

Climate data for Puerto Deseado (1991–2020, extremes 1941–present) (Note: The record highs and lows are based on the Deutscher Wetterdienst link for the period 1941–1990 while records beyond 1980 come from the Oficina de Riesgo Agropecuario link since it only covers from 1970–present. As such, the extremes span a period from 1941–present when these 2 sources are used together)
| Month | Jan | Feb | Mar | Apr | May | Jun | Jul | Aug | Sep | Oct | Nov | Dec | Year |
|---|---|---|---|---|---|---|---|---|---|---|---|---|---|
| Record high °C (°F) | 38.3 (100.9) | 40.1 (104.2) | 34.8 (94.6) | 28.7 (83.7) | 24.0 (75.2) | 24.9 (76.8) | 18.3 (64.9) | 21.7 (71.1) | 28.3 (82.9) | 30.4 (86.7) | 34.5 (94.1) | 36.6 (97.9) | 40.1 (104.2) |
| Mean daily maximum °C (°F) | 23.4 (74.1) | 22.3 (72.1) | 20.2 (68.4) | 16.2 (61.2) | 11.7 (53.1) | 8.0 (46.4) | 7.6 (45.7) | 10.2 (50.4) | 13.1 (55.6) | 16.6 (61.9) | 19.7 (67.5) | 21.6 (70.9) | 15.9 (60.6) |
| Daily mean °C (°F) | 16.4 (61.5) | 15.6 (60.1) | 13.8 (56.8) | 10.5 (50.9) | 7.2 (45.0) | 4.3 (39.7) | 3.5 (38.3) | 5.2 (41.4) | 7.3 (45.1) | 10.3 (50.5) | 13.1 (55.6) | 15.1 (59.2) | 10.2 (50.4) |
| Mean daily minimum °C (°F) | 10.5 (50.9) | 10.2 (50.4) | 8.6 (47.5) | 5.8 (42.4) | 3.2 (37.8) | 0.8 (33.4) | 0.1 (32.2) | 1.2 (34.2) | 2.6 (36.7) | 5.0 (41.0) | 7.3 (45.1) | 9.4 (48.9) | 5.4 (41.7) |
| Record low °C (°F) | 0.0 (32.0) | 0.0 (32.0) | −1.1 (30.0) | −3.8 (25.2) | −9.6 (14.7) | −10.0 (14.0) | −10.5 (13.1) | −9.7 (14.5) | −5.8 (21.6) | −7.6 (18.3) | −1.4 (29.5) | 0.0 (32.0) | −10.5 (13.1) |
| Average precipitation mm (inches) | 21.3 (0.84) | 15.5 (0.61) | 15.9 (0.63) | 25.4 (1.00) | 30.2 (1.19) | 24.6 (0.97) | 27.0 (1.06) | 15.8 (0.62) | 13.1 (0.52) | 15.2 (0.60) | 9.5 (0.37) | 14.1 (0.56) | 227.6 (8.96) |
| Average precipitation days (≥ 0.1 mm) | 8 | 6 | 6 | 7 | 10 | 9 | 8 | 7 | 6 | 6 | 6 | 6 | 85 |
| Average snowy days | 0.0 | 0.0 | 0.0 | 0.1 | 0.4 | 1.3 | 1.7 | 0.9 | 0.6 | 0.2 | 0.0 | 0.1 | 5.2 |
| Average relative humidity (%) | 54.7 | 59.5 | 62.9 | 65.0 | 70.5 | 75.1 | 74.6 | 69.6 | 66.4 | 60.4 | 55.5 | 55.6 | 64.2 |
| Mean monthly sunshine hours | 235.6 | 211.9 | 164.3 | 135.0 | 102.3 | 78.0 | 96.1 | 120.9 | 123.0 | 182.9 | 213.0 | 204.6 | 1,867.6 |
| Mean daily sunshine hours | 7.6 | 7.5 | 5.3 | 4.5 | 3.3 | 2.6 | 3.1 | 3.9 | 4.1 | 5.9 | 7.1 | 6.6 | 5.1 |
| Percentage possible sunshine | 34.5 | 43.5 | 34.5 | 36.0 | 27.0 | 28.0 | 29.0 | 36.5 | 31.0 | 38.0 | 37.0 | 29.5 | 33.7 |
Source 1: Servicio Meteorológico Nacional (precipitation days 1961–1990)
Source 2: Deutscher Wetterdienst (precipitation 1961–1990, extremes, 1941–1990), Secretaria de Mineria (percent sun, 1951–1980),

== Tourism ==
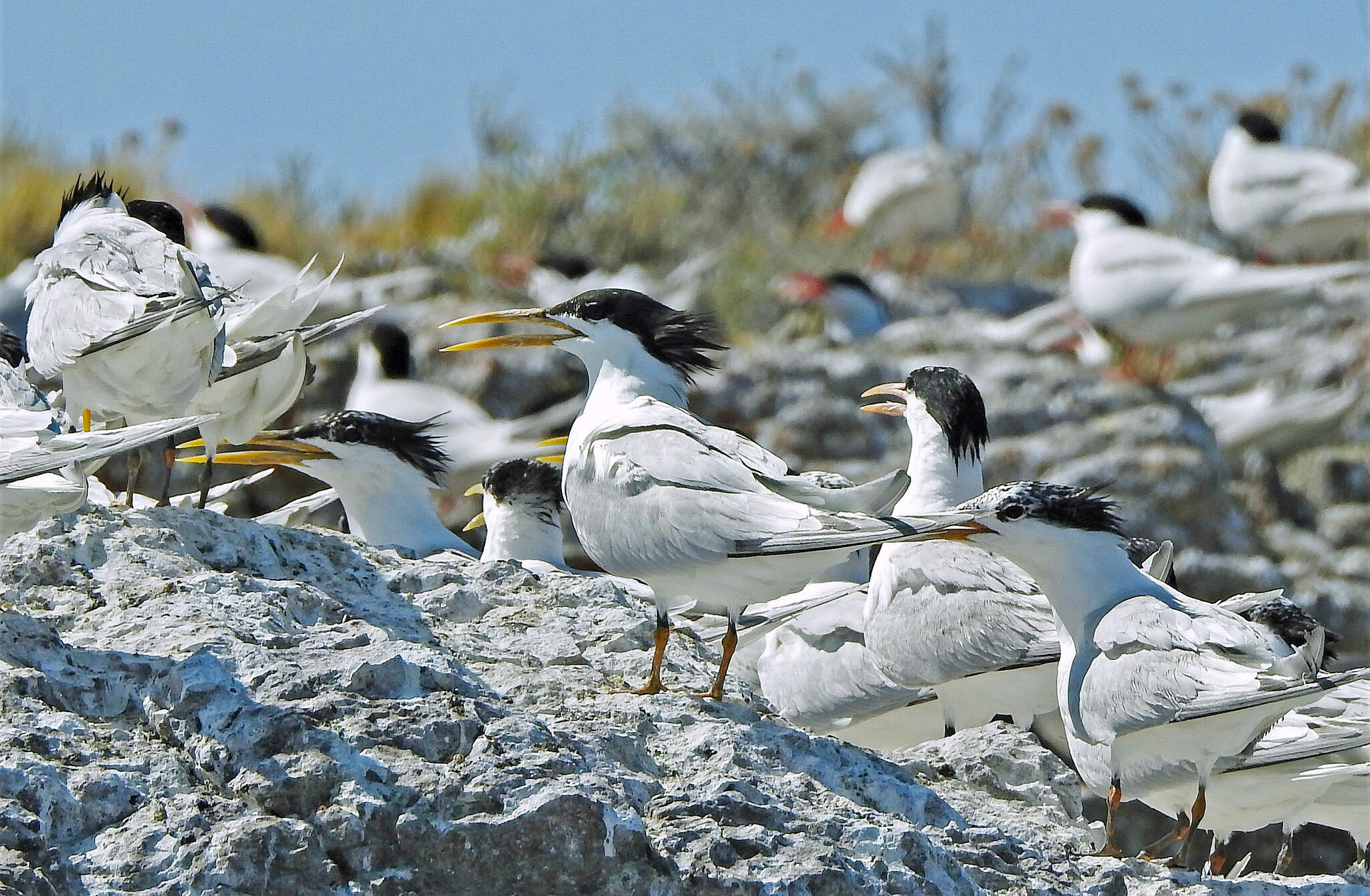
Cabot's terns breeding on an islet off Puerto Deseado

Most of the tourism industry is based on touring the estuary to see the diverse fauna, such as the Commerson's dolphin, Magellanic and rockhopper penguins.

== Economy ==
Puerto Deseado's economy is based on the fishing industry. There are several fish-processing plants by its coasts on "Avenida Costanera" and a high percentage of the population works on jobs related to industrial fishing such as stevedores, crane operators, fish cleaners and the like.

== References in films and literature ==
=== Films ===
The movie Gone Fishing by Carlos Sorín is set almost entirely in Puerto Deseado.

=== Literature ===
Puerto Deseado is the main setting of the novels The Sunken Secret and The Arrow Collector by Cristian Perfumo. The Sunken Secret is based on the true story of the wreck and recovery of HMS Swift, a British sloop of war that sank off the town's coast. Gerald Durrell briefly visited and writes about Puerto Deseado in his book "The Whispering Land", published in 1961. Durrell was in Argentina to film wildlife and to collect animals for his private zoo.

== See also ==
- ARA Puerto Deseado, an oceanographic ship
