= Charles Grignion the Younger =

British painter

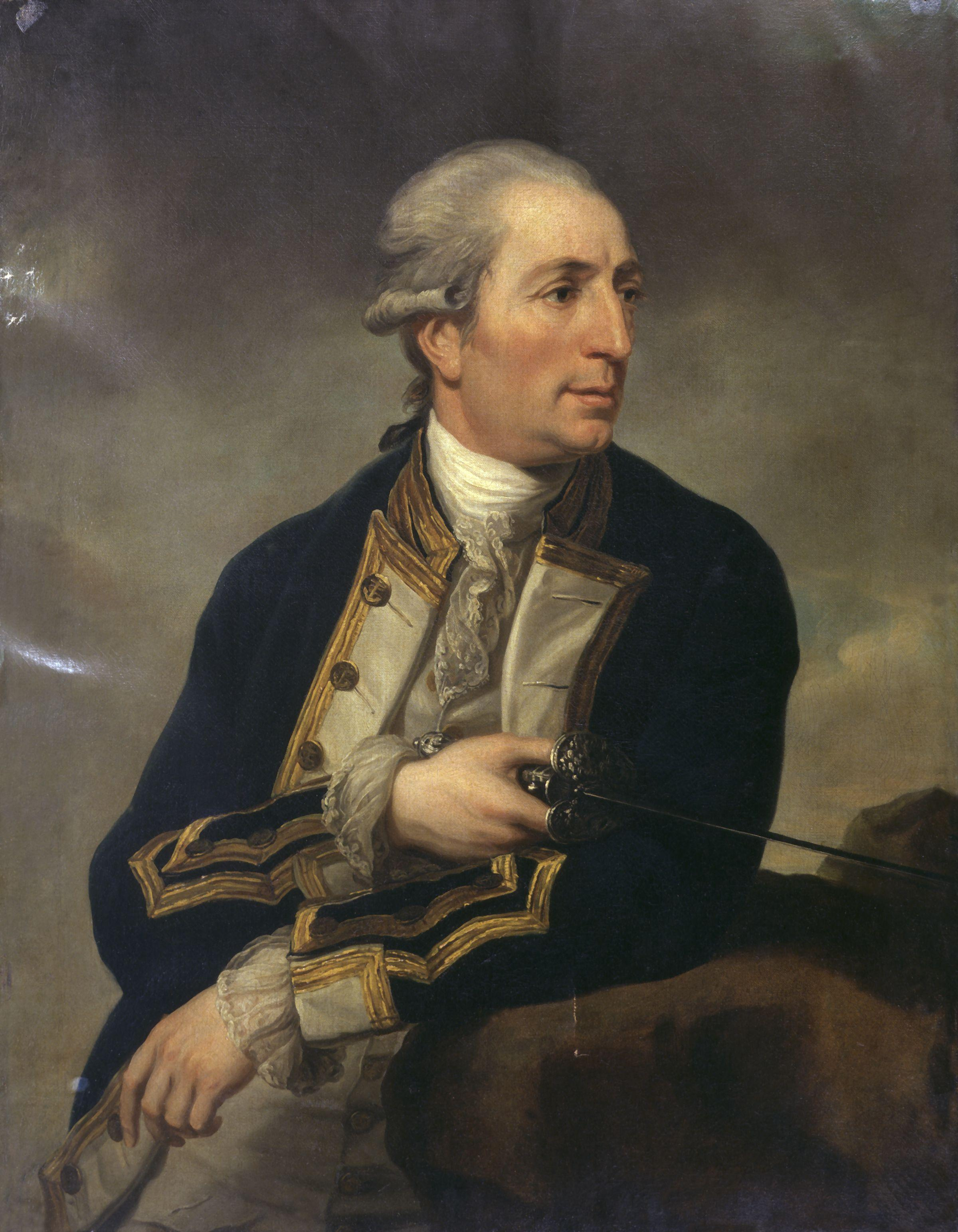
George Farmer, painted by Charles Grignion the Younger, National Portrait Gallery, 1778

Charles Grignion the Younger (1754–1804) was a British history painter, portrait painter, and engraver.

== Biography ==
Grignion was born in London. His uncle was the prolific engraver Charles Grignion the Elder.

He died in Livorno after a short illness and was buried there in the Old English Cemetery
