= Pablo Avelluto =

Argentine journalist

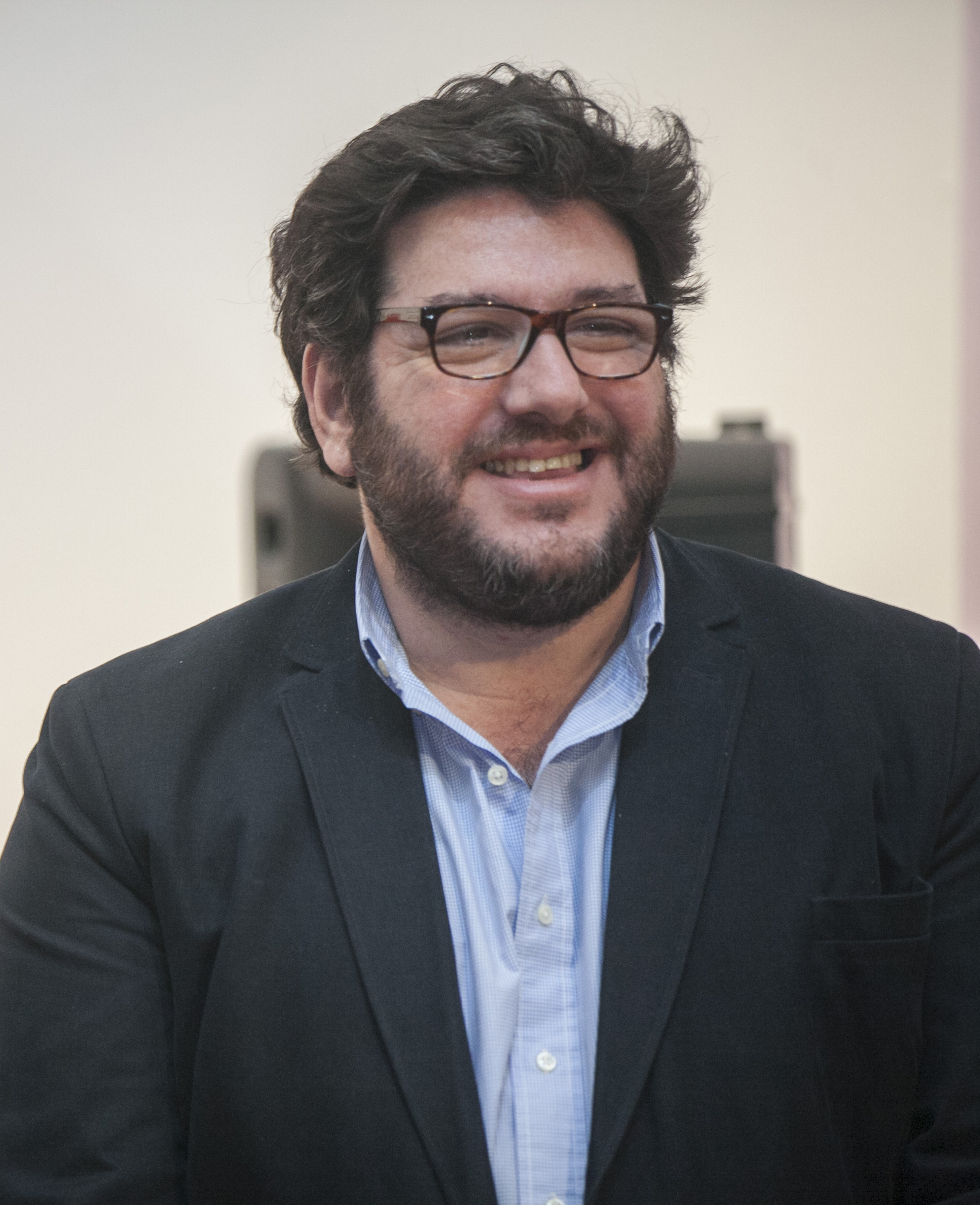
Minister for Culture of Argentina

Alejandro Pablo Avelluto (born 18 February 1966) is an Argentine journalist, book editor and politician. He held the office of Minister for Culture of Argentina since 10 December 2015 to September 2018, appointed by Mauricio Macri. Between 2014 and 2015 he served as General Coordinator of the Public Media System of the Autonomous City of Buenos Aires.

== Professional career ==
Avelluto was born on 18 February 1966 in Buenos Aires. His father was a Roman Catholic, while his mother was of sephardic and Spanish origin. His maternal grandmother, Gentil Calderón, was born in İzmir in 1905 and through her is related to polemicist Carlos Maslatón. He was educated at Carlos Pellegrini High School of Commerce. He holds a Licentiate degree in Social Communication Sciences from the Faculty of Social Sciences of the University of Buenos Aires, where he taught and conducted research. In the field of journalism, he has contributed to publications such as La Nación, ¨El porteño¨, ¨Tres Puntos¨, ¨El Ciudadano¨ and ¨Babel¨, among other media. He also worked in radio journalism and was one of the founding members of ¨El Bulo de Merlin¨, one of the first community radio stations in Argentina.

His career in the book industry, which started in 1993, included various positions in publishing houses such as Espasa-Calpe, Grupo Editorial Planeta and Editorial Sudamericana, Random House Mondadori. He also worked in educational publishing houses such as Ángel Estrada & Co. and magazines such as Torneos y Competencias. During his term as Editorial Director of the Southern Region at Random House Mondadori, between 2005 and 2012, he was responsible for the publication of more than four thousand works of different genres and authors, half of which were of Argentine origin. Among the local authors published during his administration are Horacio Verbitsky, Jorge Lanata, Beatriz Sarlo, Ricardo Forster, Marcos Aguinis, Jorge Asís, Jorge Fernández Díaz, Maitena Burundarena, Pacho O'Donnell and Juan José Sebreli.

Between 2004 and 2005 he was Vice-President of the Argentine Chamber of Publications.

In 2014 he was appointed General Coordinator of the Public Media System of the City of Buenos Aires, which includes the radios AM 1110 (the city radio) and FM 2x4, the city channel, the Cultural Agenda and La Agenda, a magazine of ideas and culture in the city founded during his term.

In the October elections of 2015, he was elected as Parlasur representative for the Autonomous City of Buenos Aires, after leading the ballot in PRO. After taking office as President of the Nation, on 10 December 2015 Mauricio Macri appointed Avelluto as Minister for Culture of the Nation.

== Administration as head of the Ministry of Culture ==
On 10 December 2015, he took office as Minister for Culture of the Nation. Innovation, creativity, federalism and consensus among the Argentinian people stand out as the main focus points in his administration. has three subsecretaries: Culture and Creativity (Enrique Avogadro), Cultural Cooperation (Iván Petrella) and Cultural Heritage (Marcelo Panozzo).

Regarding the direction of his administration, Avelluto said in an interview with the newspaper La Capital de Rosario: "I have the challenge of proving that I can make cultural politics without propaganda and without asking the artists who they vote for, or what their partisan and ideological sympathies are. The relevance of the artists is in their work and in their talent. There is no greater value. The state must open the field to those who agree with the government and those who do not, that is the challenge when it comes to making public policies." He added: "Our vision poses a much more luminous, open, plural and diverse scenario to several orientations of the world, that enrich one another. There are no good guys and bad guys facing each other in unresolved conflicts, we are looking for a more open process of collective construction." In an interview for the digital newspaper Infobae, he pointed out that his administration "aims at generational renewal".

The Ministry's Secretariat for the Strategic Coordination of National Thought was dissolved. Avelluto pointed out that “the notion of the existence of a 'national thought' is very typical of the 20th century: the idea that there is a thought of ours that is in confrontation with another way of thinking. To us there are many forms of thought and all are produced, consumed, generated, intervened by Argentines."

Avelluto conserved the autonomous functioning of different institutions (National Library, National Arts Fund, National Theater Institute, INCAA, National Commission of Public Libraries, national museums, permanent companies, etc.). Where appropriate he appointed recognized specialists, such as Leandro de Sagastizábal and Alejandro Tantanian, as heads.

Avelluto also announced the appointment of Alberto Manguel, an internationally recognized author, as director of the National Library.

== The legacy bequeathed ==
In June 2015 the government presented the Report El estado del Estado (The state of the State), which sought to carry out "a diagnosis of the National State in December 2015 and identify the pending challenges, which sometimes coincide with mistakes or excesses of the immediately previous administration, but often show long-standing Argentinian frustrations, sometimes even decades old."

In the section on the situation inherited at the Ministry, the Report stated that "the main characteristics of the Ministry of Culture were disorder and administrative inefficiency. This was verified, for example, with the existence of unpaid debts for 156 million pesos. Another central aspect was the excessive hiring of personnel in the last year of the previous administration, in which the central management of the ministry went from 3,000 to 4,064 employees only in 2015, among different employment categories. Several dozens of these hirings were made in the last hours before the change of government."

== First months of his term as minister ==
From the beginning of the term Pablo Avelluto was incorporated to the Cabinet for Human Development of the government, in charge of monitoring and generating measures to alleviate sensitive social situations. In addition to his specific role as Minister for Culture, he acted as a spokesperson for the administration of President Mauricio Macri, which was reflected in his frequent participation in interviews and radio and television programs.

Avelluto also played a prominent role in the organization of the celebrations for the Independence Bicentennial about which it was pointed out that they were "the beginning of our third century together and the opportunity to, beyond our differences, show what unites us." On the part of the Ministry of Culture, the celebrations included the renewal of the Historic House of Independence, the organization of the most important traveling exhibition in the history of the National Museum of Fine Arts and the launch of the Current Art Laboratories in Tucumán and of the Days of Art and Thought in the Bicentennial House of the City of Buenos Aires as well as commemorative activities in all national museums.

Among the programs, measures, proposals and announcements launched during the first months of Avelluto's term, it is worth mentioning:

Creation Bicentennial Grants. The National Arts Fund (FNA) launched 200 grants of 50,000 pesos each in eight artistic disciplines.

Creative Cities Network Program. Its objective was to make the creative economy of the country and local talent visible through five axes: creativity and government; Public space and creativity; sectoral development of creative industries; promotion of cultural tourism and collaborative work.

Festival of Ideas. Open and collaborative exchange spaces to think, debate and imagine new ideas and functional solutions that improve people's quality of life in the communities in which they live through their connection with culture. Done in different cities around the country.

National Theater Festival in Tucumán. The festival's 22nd edition, with almost the entire program made up of productions by new generations of national authors.

Cultural Points Program. It aimed at strengthening social and community organizations throughout the country that developed artistic, communication and cultural initiatives towards social inclusion, the rescue of local identity and citizen participation.

Training Program in Public Cultural Management. Its purpose was to contribute to the professionalization of cultural agents in the public sphere from all regions of the country.

Reduction of deadlines for licensing export and import of works of art and cultural goods

Creative Argentina Forum. Events on trends in creativity and cultural innovation.

Cultural Innovation National Contest. He provided $200,000 to each of the twenty most innovative cultural projects that improve people's access to cultural goods and services.

Federal Culture Forums. Their aim was to build a federal network of consultants and enhance the cultural capacity of each province.

Calling to National Contests of Cartoon Strip (National Library), Dramaturgy (National Theater Institute) and the Young Narrative Fiction Award.

Public Stage Program. Its objective was to promote the formation of emerging artists in their own region.

Reopening of the house of Victoria Ocampo in Barrio Parque, with the aim of turning it into a residence for writers.

In addition, in order to increase bibliographic diversity, favor freedom of choice of Argentinian readers and facilitate the exchange between the local publishing industry and international markets, the ministers for Culture, Pablo Avelluto, and for Production, Francisco Cabrera, announced in January 2016 the lifting of restrictions that prevented the entry of books printed abroad.

Argentina Platform/ARCO: The program Argentina Plataform/ARCO aimed at having Argentina as a Guest of Honor Country at the ARCOmadrid2017, a parallel program that would account for the richness and dynamism of our contemporary culture. The Ministry of Culture of the Nation, within the framework of one of its objectives -the promotion of Argentine culture in all its expressions- publicly accepted the invitation proposal in February 2016 and received the formal invitation in October of that year. year. Thereby, Argentina Platform / ARCO took visual arts, literature, cinema, theater, performances and music to 22 institutions in Madrid and had an audience of more than 170 thousand people. In March 2017 the representatives Rodolfo Tailhade and Liliana Mazure (FPV) launched a complaint against Avelluto. The case fell into the hands of Judge Sebastián Casanello, who opened an investigation on the public hirings for the fair by the Ministry of Culture. To this end, the prosecutor promotes research on documents that are on public records, such as resolution 16/16. by which the hirings for the realization of shows abroad were carried out. Meanwhile, days before the start of the fair Avelluto himself explained in an interview with the site Infobae.com the details of the preparation for Argentina's participation. There he said that the selection of artists and gallerists responded to search criteria for the contemporary, regardless of the political affiliation or sympathy of the creators

== Criticism and controversy ==
Upon taking office, Avelluto resolved to close the National Institute of Argentine and Ibero-American Historical Revisionism Manuel Dorrego. He made the decision not to renew the contract of about 500 Ministry employees. Beatriz Sarlo, Maristella Svampa, Daniel Link, Claudia Piñeiro and Emilio de Ipola expressed their opposition to this situation.
