= I'Anson =

I'Anson is a surname. Notable people with the surname include:

- Charlie I'Anson (born 1993), English footballer
- Chaz I'Anson (born 1986), English rugby league player
- Edward I'Anson (1812–1888), English architect
- Henry I'Anson (1734–1767), English naval commander
- Hugh I'Anson Fausset (1895–1965), English writer
- I'Anson baronets (1652–1800), 17th and 18th-century title in the Baronetage of England
- Lawrence W. I'Anson (1907–1990), Virginia Supreme Court judge
- Lisa I'Anson (born 1965), British broadcaster
- Thomas John I'Anson Bromwich (1875–1929), English mathematician
- I'Anson (musician), British musician
