= Anthony Hunt (disambiguation) =

Anthony Hunt (1932–2022) was a British engineer.

Anthony Hunt may also refer to:

- Anthony Hunt (Royal Navy officer, died 1795), Royal Navy captain
- Anthony Hunt (Royal Navy officer, died 1798), Royal Navy captain
