= HMS Mecklenburgh =

Cutter of the Royal Navy

History

Great Britain
- Name: HMS Mecklenburgh
- Launched: 1758 as merchant vessel
- Commissioned: April 1763
- Decommissioned: September 1773
- In service: 1763–1773
- Out of service: September 1773
- Fate: Sunk as breakwater, Sheerness

General characteristics
- Class & type: 6-gun cutter
- Tons burthen: 82 89/94 (bm)
- Length: 54 ft 0 in (16.5 m) (overall); 48 ft 8 in (14.8 m) (keel)
- Beam: 19 ft 7 in (6.0 m)
- Depth of hold: 8 ft 4 in (2.54 m)
- Sail plan: fore-and-aft rig
- Complement: 30
- Armament: 8 × 3-pounder guns (prior to Navy purchase in 1763); 6 × 3-pounder guns, 10 x 1/2-pounder swivels (1763–73)

HMS Mecklenburgh was a 6-gun single-masted cutter of the Royal Navy, purchased in 1763 during the last days of the Seven Years' War with France and assigned to coastal patrol offshore from Sussex. After ten years' service she was partly dismantled and sunk to form part of a breakwater in the port of Sheerness.

== Construction ==
Mecklenburgh was one of thirty cutters purchased by the Royal Navy in a three-month period from December 1762 to February 1763, for coastal duties off English ports. The function of these purchased cutters included convoy and patrol, the carrying of messages between Naval vessels in port and assisting the press gang in the interception of merchant craft. (Note: Merchant seamen were eligible for Navy impressment if they were aboard merchant vessels returning to English ports after trading overseas. To avoid being pressed, seamen would routinely board small coastal craft sent out to their ships before they made port. These small vessels would then land the seamen on beaches outside the port proper. During the War of the Austrian Succession and the Seven Years' War, Navy cutters like Mecklenburgh were stationed in major seaports in order to intercept these craft and deliver those on board to the press gang in the port.)

Admiralty Orders for her purchase were issued on 29 December 1762, and the transaction was completed on 4 February 1763 at a cost of £400. She was a small craft, single-masted and with an overall length of 54 ft 0 in (16.5 m) including bowsprit, a 48 ft 8 in (14.8 m) keel, and measuring 82 89/94 tons burthen. Her beam was 19 ft 7 in (6.0 m). Admiralty records indicate she was French-built and had been at sea as a merchant vessel since 1758.

On 12 February 1763 the newly purchased cutter was sailed to Sheerness Dockyard for fitting out as a Navy craft. Works ran for four months until 26 June, at a total cost of £994. Her merchant armament of eight three-pounder cannons was reduced to six, supported by ten 1/2-pounder swivel guns for anti-personnel use.

As rebuilt for Navy service, Mecklenburgh had a complement of 30 crew.

== Naval service ==
War with France ended on 10 February 1763, after Mecklenburgh's purchase but before completion of her fitout or assembling of her crew. Despite this, commissioning went ahead in April 1763 and the vessel entered the Navy as a patrol cutter off the Sussex coast. Her first commander was Lieutenant Henry I'Anson, formerly 1st lieutenant of Achilles, subsequently commander of the first Tamar, who served aboard Mecklenburgh until 1765. In 1766 command passed to Lieutenant Thomas Parke, and in 1769 to Lieutenant William Hills.

Mecklenburgh was declared surplus to navy requirements in 1773 and was sailed to Sheerness Dockyard for partial dismantling. The stripped-down hull of the vessel was then towed into the harbour and sunk as part of a breakwater.

== Bibliography ==
- Baugh, Daniel A. (1965). British Naval Administration in the Age of Walpole. Princeton University Press. OCLC 729683642.
- Winfield, Rif (2007). British Warships of the Age of Sail 1714–1792: Design, Construction, Careers and Fates. Seaforth. ISBN 9781844157006.
