= Port Egmont =

First British settlement on the Falkland Islands, established 1765

Coordinates: 51°21′13″S 60°03′51″W

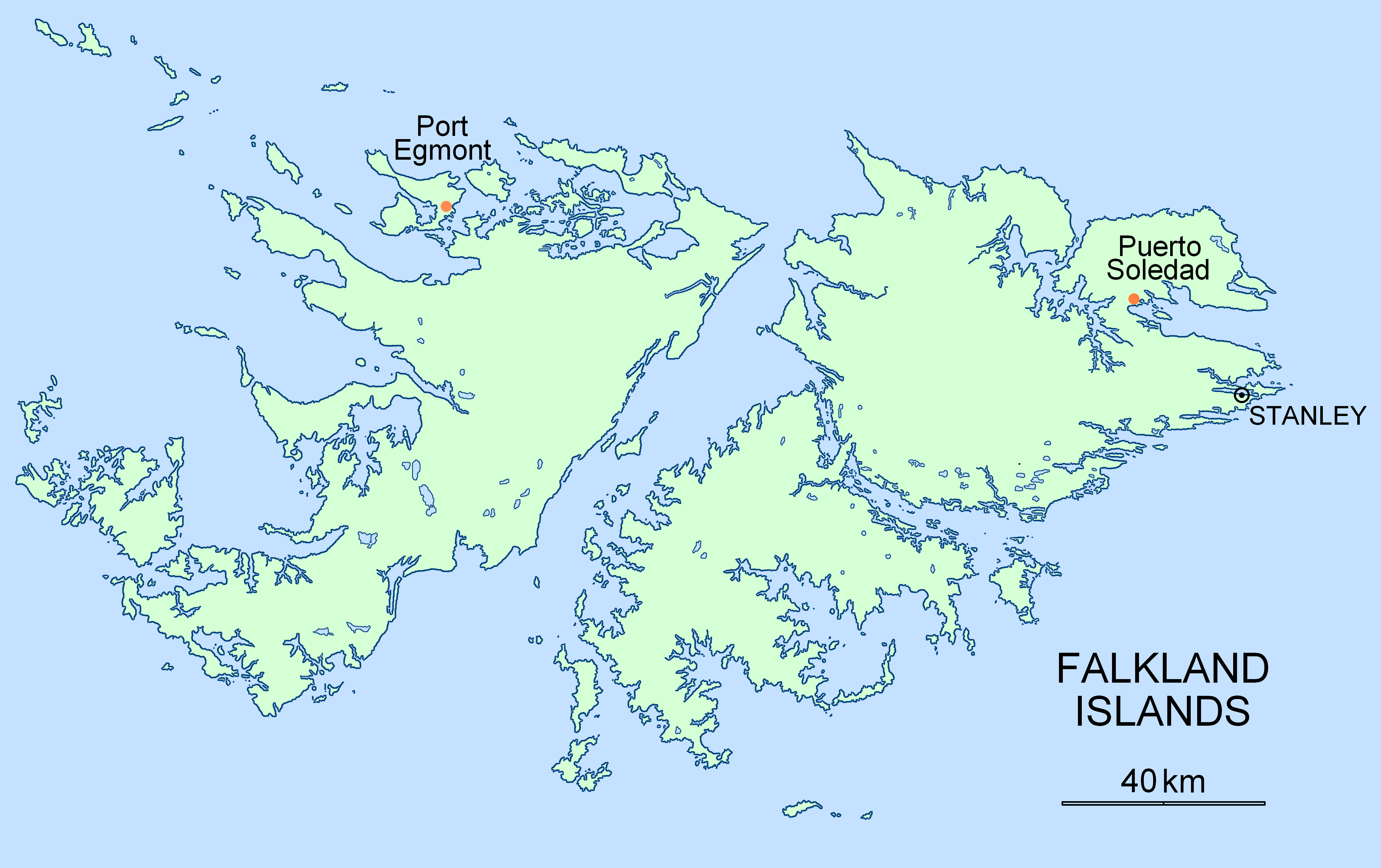
Location of Port Egmont, Falkland Islands

Port Egmont (Spanish: Puerto de la Cruzada; French: Poil de la Croisade) was the first British settlement in the Falkland Islands, on Saunders Island off West Falkland, and is named after John Perceval, 2nd Earl of Egmont, who was First Lord of the Admiralty at the time of its founding.

== Toponym ==
Details from a map of Port Egmont in 1770 by Carrington Bowles.

The original name for the settlement was Jason's Town and Port Egmont was the body of water surrounded by Saunders Island, Keppel Island and the main island of West Falkland. Fort George was the small garrison established nearby. The details of the settlement are included on a map drawn by Carrington Bowles and first published in 1770; only one known copy remains.

== History ==
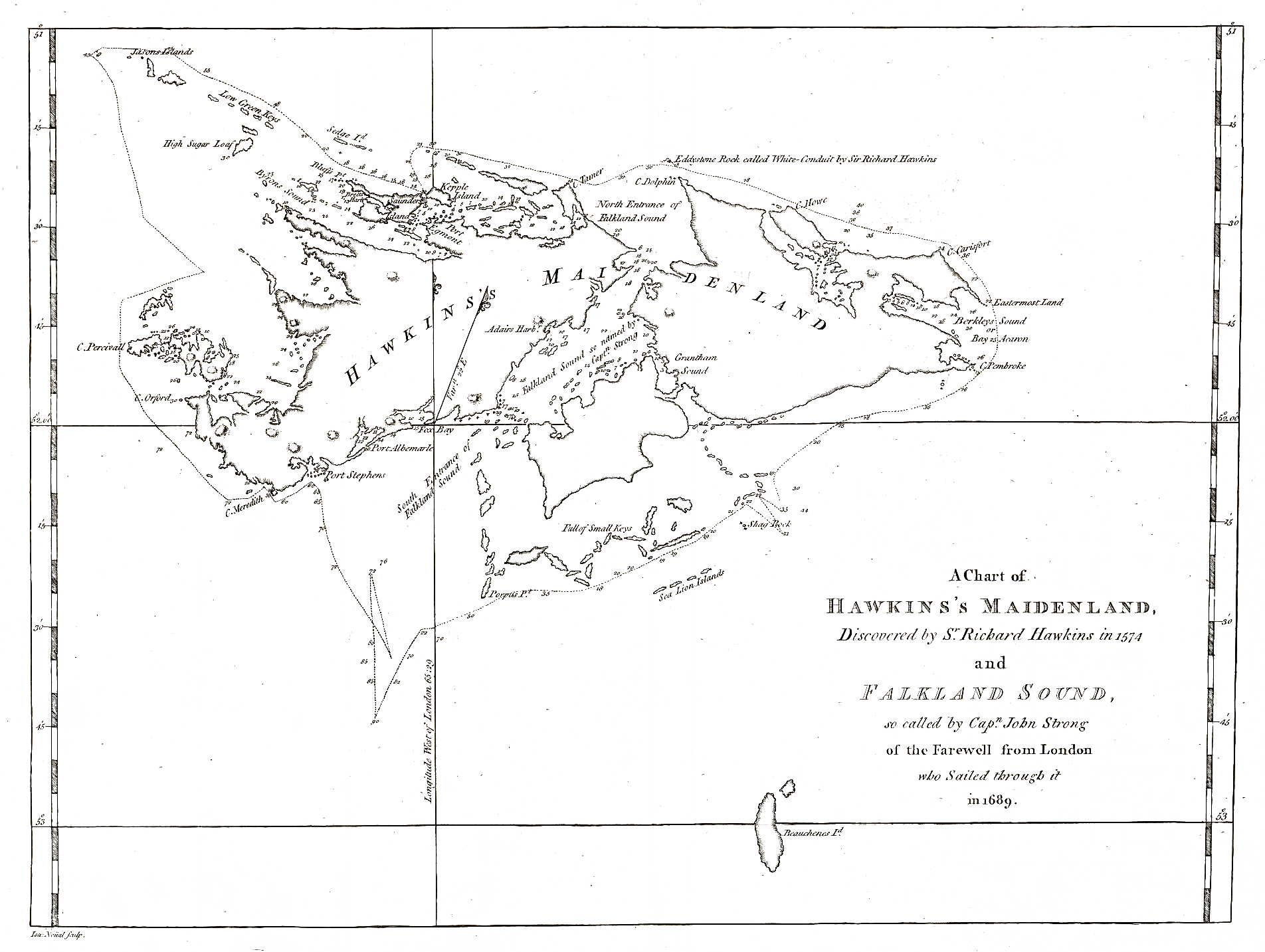
MacBride's chart, the ship track depicted is that of HMS Jason in 1766

On 26 January 1765, an expedition led by Commodore John Byron consisting of the boats HMS Dolphin, HMS Tamar and HMS Florida entered the bay at West Falkland and named it Port Egmont. (Arrival was 15 January 1765 O.S.) The expedition went ashore on 3 February (23 January O.S.) and raised the Union Jack.

Another expedition arrived around a year later in January 1766, led by Captain John MacBride, with the ships HMS Jason, HMS Carcass and HMS Experiment after which Carcass Island and the Jason Islands are named. This was to secure possession, and McBride ordered one of the ships to stay at Port Egmont, and develop the settlement, resulting in several permanent buildings and a garrison. MacBride, in command of HMS Jason, carried out the first hydrographic survey of the Falklands in 1766 and discovered a number of minor islands including Weddell, Beaver and New Islands off the southwest extremity of the archipelago. The chart based on that survey was one of the most accurate for its time. MacBride also made the first systematic meteorological observations in the Falklands. In January and February the thermometer at Port Egmont rose to 15 °C (59 °F), but no higher; in August, it once fell to −7 °C (20 °F), but was seldom lower than 0 °C (32 °F).

The next few years resulted in conflicting claims with the French and Spanish, with the British using Port Egmont as a basis for their claim. In early 1770 Spanish commander Don Juan Ignacio de Madariaga briefly visited Port Egmont. He returned from Montevideo on 10 June with five armed ships and 1400 soldiers forcing the British to leave Port Egmont.

In 1771, after threats of war with Spain, the colony was re-established by Captain John Stott with the ships HMS Juno, HMS Hound and HMS Florida, the latter being at the founding of the original settlement. The port became an important stop for ships going around Cape Horn

In 1774, Britain abandoned many of its overseas garrisons for economic reasons and Port Egmont was no exception due to the result of the American Revolution. In 1776, the British forces left leaving a lead plate stating that the island was still a British possession. The colony was immediately taken over by sealers but in 1780 the buildings were destroyed under orders from Spanish authorities.

== Gallery ==
Remainings of the British Settlement at Port Egmont
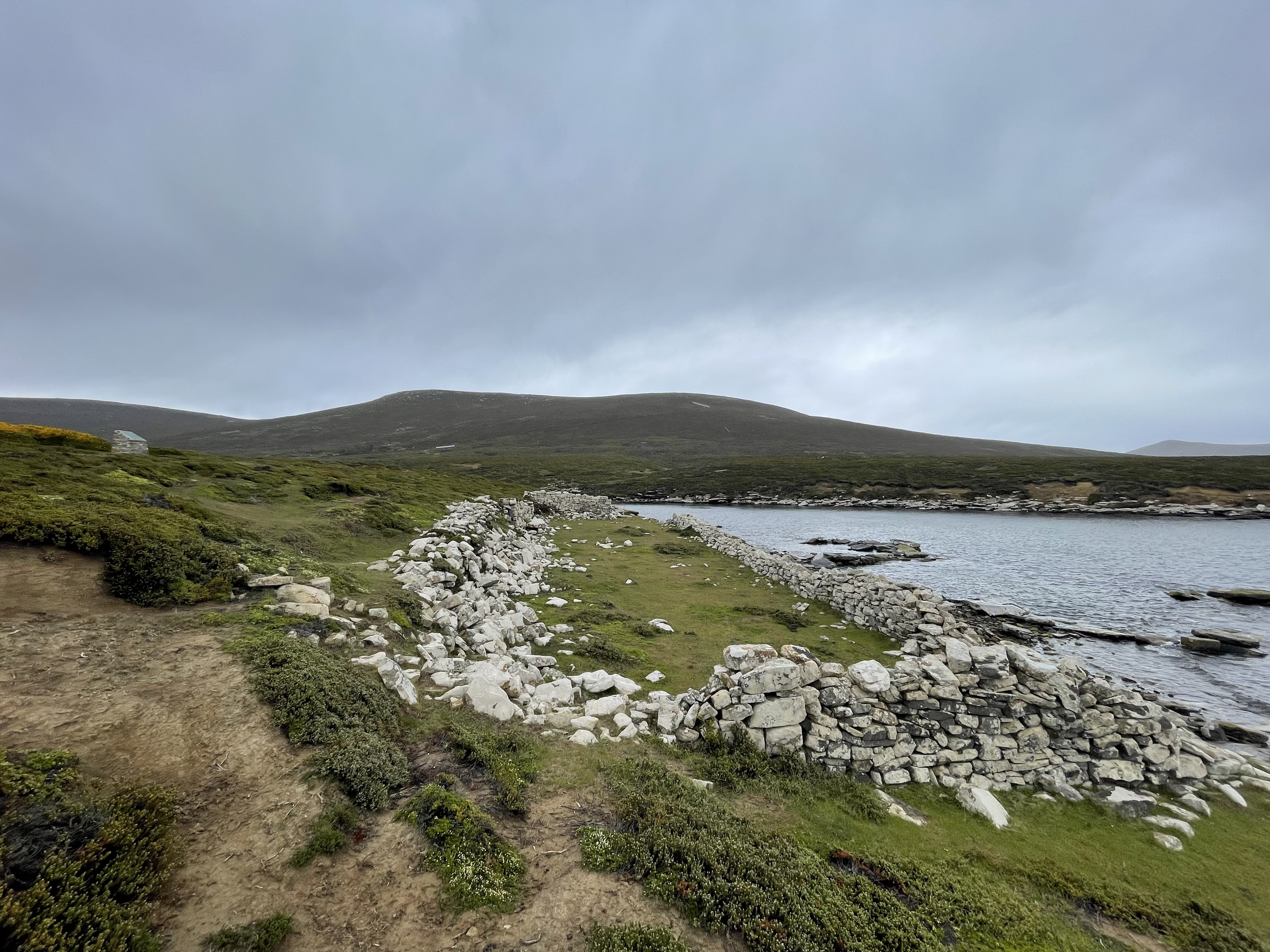
Building closest to the coast

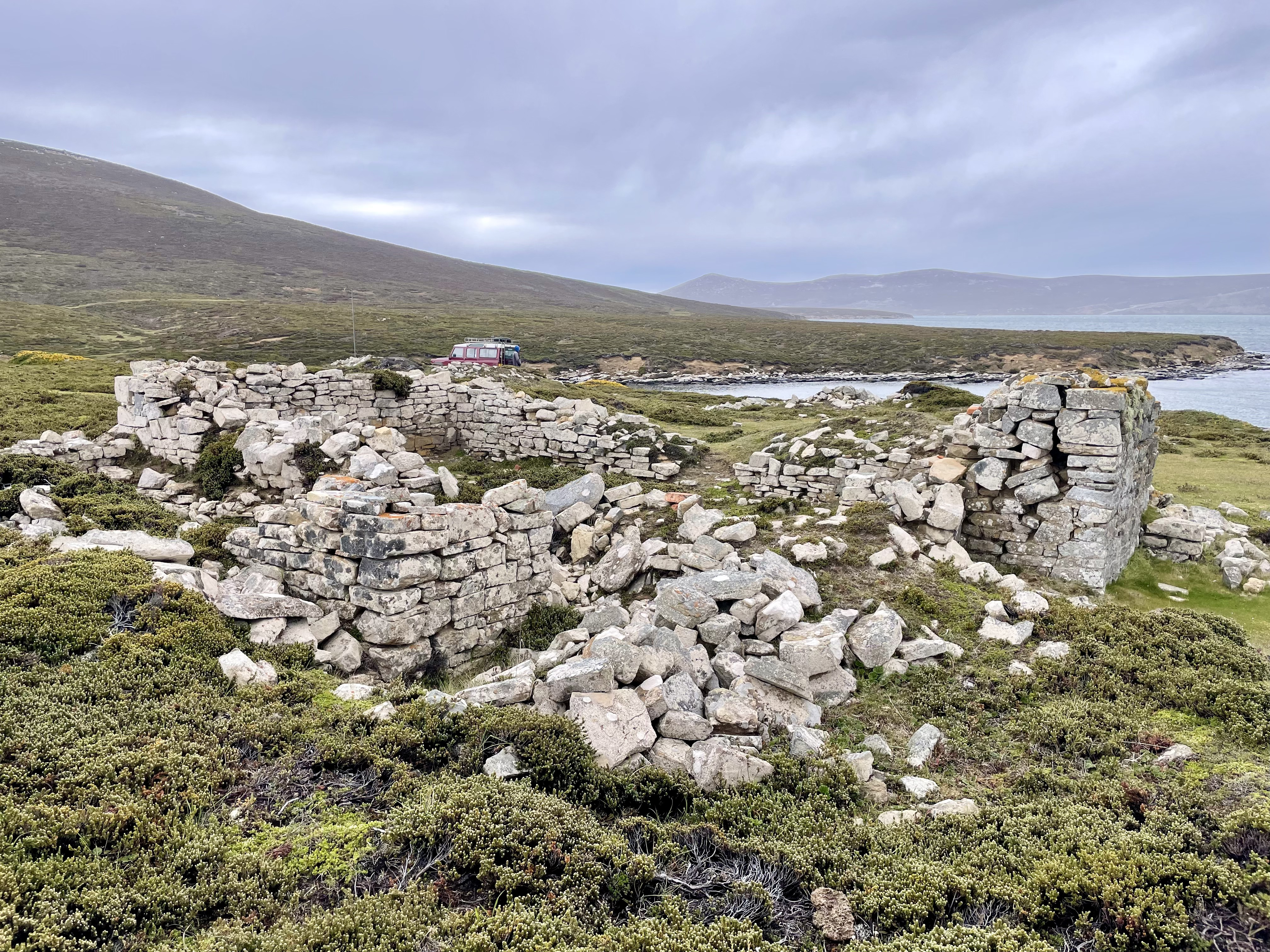
Smaller building near the coast

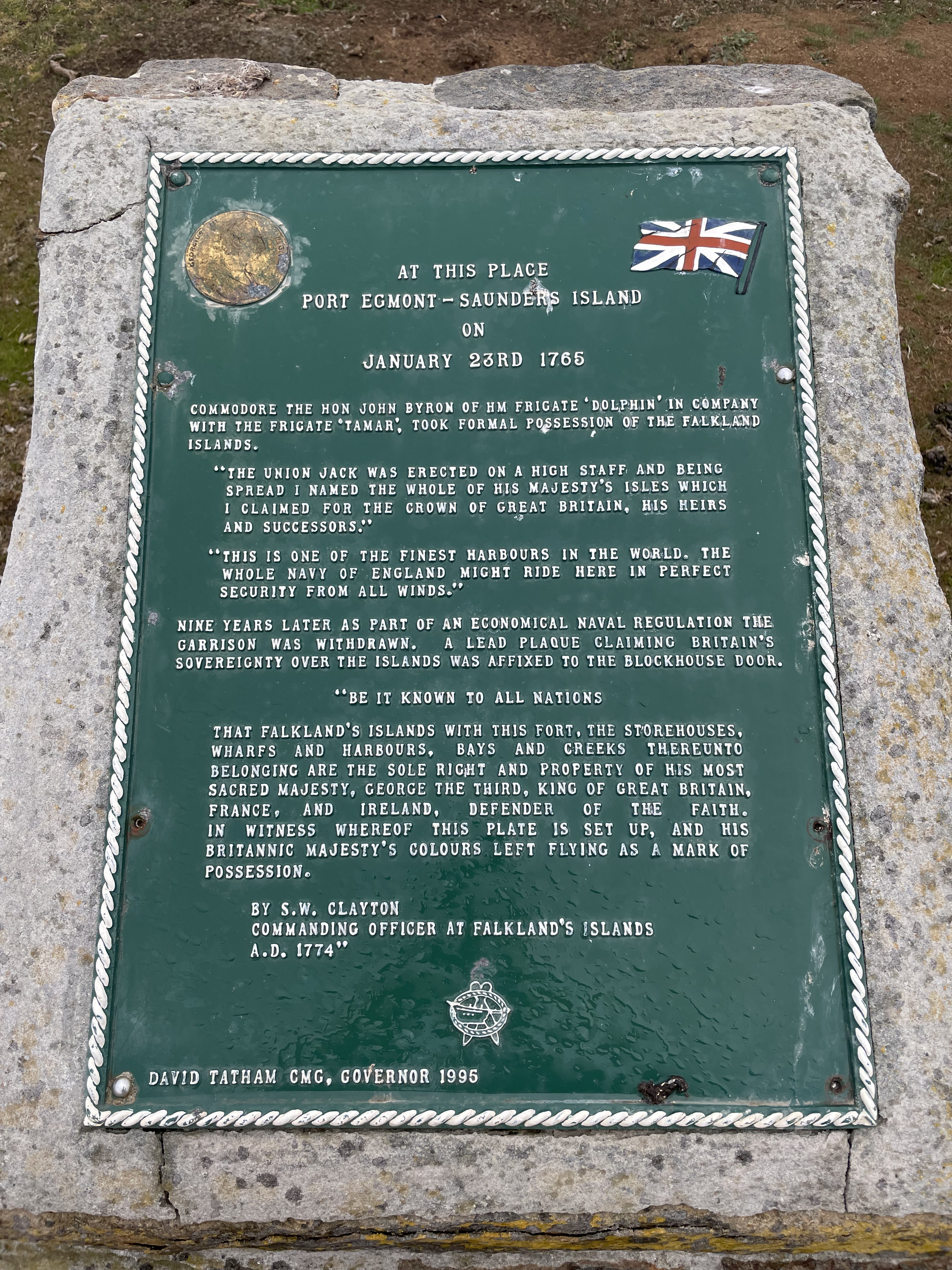
Plaque commemorating the settlement

== See also ==
- Port Saint Louis, the first settlement on the islands (by French colonists)
