= Anthony Hunt (Royal Navy officer, died 1795) =

Captain in the Royal Navy

Captain Anthony Hunt
- Born: c.1734
- Died: 1795
- Military career
- Allegiance: Great Britain
- Branch: Royal Navy
- Service years: 1743–1795
- Rank: Captain
- Commands: HMS Tamar; Governor of the Falkland Islands; HMS Ludlow Castle; HMS Sphinx; HMS Portland; HMS Digilent
- Conflicts: Seven Years' War; Raid on St Malo; American Revolutionary War; Affair of Fielding and Bylandt

Captain Anthony Hunt (died 1795) was a Royal Navy officer. He commanded the garrison on Sanders Island during a dispute over sovereignty of the remote territory with a Spanish schooner: events which precipitated the Capture of Port Egmont by the Spanish Empire and the Falklands Crisis of 1770.

== Career ==
On 28 November 1769, Hunt was the officer of the garrison on Sanders Island when he observed a Spanish schooner hovering about the island while surveying it. He sent the commander a message, by which he required of him to depart. An exchange of letters followed where each side asserted sovereignty and demanded the other depart. Hunt stated categorically that the Falkland Islands belonged to Britain and demanded that the Spanish leave. These events precipitated the Capture of Port Egmont and the Falklands Crisis of 1770.

In 1780 Hunt commanded the Diligente sloop on the Home station. Midshipman Richard Poulden served under him.

== Sources ==
- David, Andrew (2012). "Hunt, Anthony". Tatham, David (ed.). Dictionary of Falklands Biography (online ed.). Retrieved 16 February 2023.
- O'Byrne, William R. (1849). "Poulden, Richard". A Naval Biographical Dictionary. London: John Murray. p. 917.
- Wagstaff, William (2001). Falkland Islands: The Bradt Travel Guide. UK: Bradt Travel Guides Ltd.; USA: The Globe Pequot Press Inc. p. 8. ISBN 978-1-84162-037-4.
