= Henry I'Anson =

British naval officer

Henry I'Anson (25 October 1734 – 29 October 1767) was a British naval officer and commander of the first HMS Tamar.

== Early life ==
I'Anson was born on the New Bounds estate in Kent, acquired by his grandfather, Sir Thomas I'Anson, the 3rd baronet of Bassetbury (b. 1648 at the Louvre in the court of exiled King Charles II of England). He was the fourth son of the Rev. Sir Thomas Bankes I'Anson, the 4th baronet. By his mother Mary Bankes, he was a greatgrandson of another royalist Sir John Bankes, Lord Chief Justice of the Common Pleas, of Corfe Castle.

== Naval career ==
I'Anson was first made lieutenant on 5 May 1755. He served as 2nd, then 1st lieutenant on the Dunkirk-class fourth rate the Achilles from its launching in 1757. It saw active service against the French in the Seven Years' War including the capture of two vessels. He served on the vessel under Admiral Samuel Barrington continuously from 1757 until at least August 1762 (with a period of illness on shore from March to November 1760) earning the admiral's "great regard". From 1763 to 1765, he commanded the cutter Mecklenburgh on coastal duties off Sussex. By 1767, he had been promoted to captain and given command of a frigate, the first HMS Tamar.

== Death ==
I'Anson died on 29 October 1767 while in active service on the Tamar.
