= Richard Poulden =

Royal Navy officer (1766–1845)

Rear-Admiral Richard Poulden
- Born: 1766; Portsea, Portsmouth
- Died: 16 March 1845 (aged 79); Clifton, Bristol
- Military career
- Allegiance: Great Britain; United Kingdom
- Service: Royal Navy
- Service years: 1776–1840
- Rank: Rear-Admiral
- Conflicts: Bourbon War; Battle of Fort Royal; War of the First Coalition; Battle of Groix; War of the Second Coalition; Mediterranean campaign; Capture of Minorca

Richard Poulden (1766–1845) was an English officer in the Royal Navy who rose to the rank of Rear-Admiral.

== Life ==
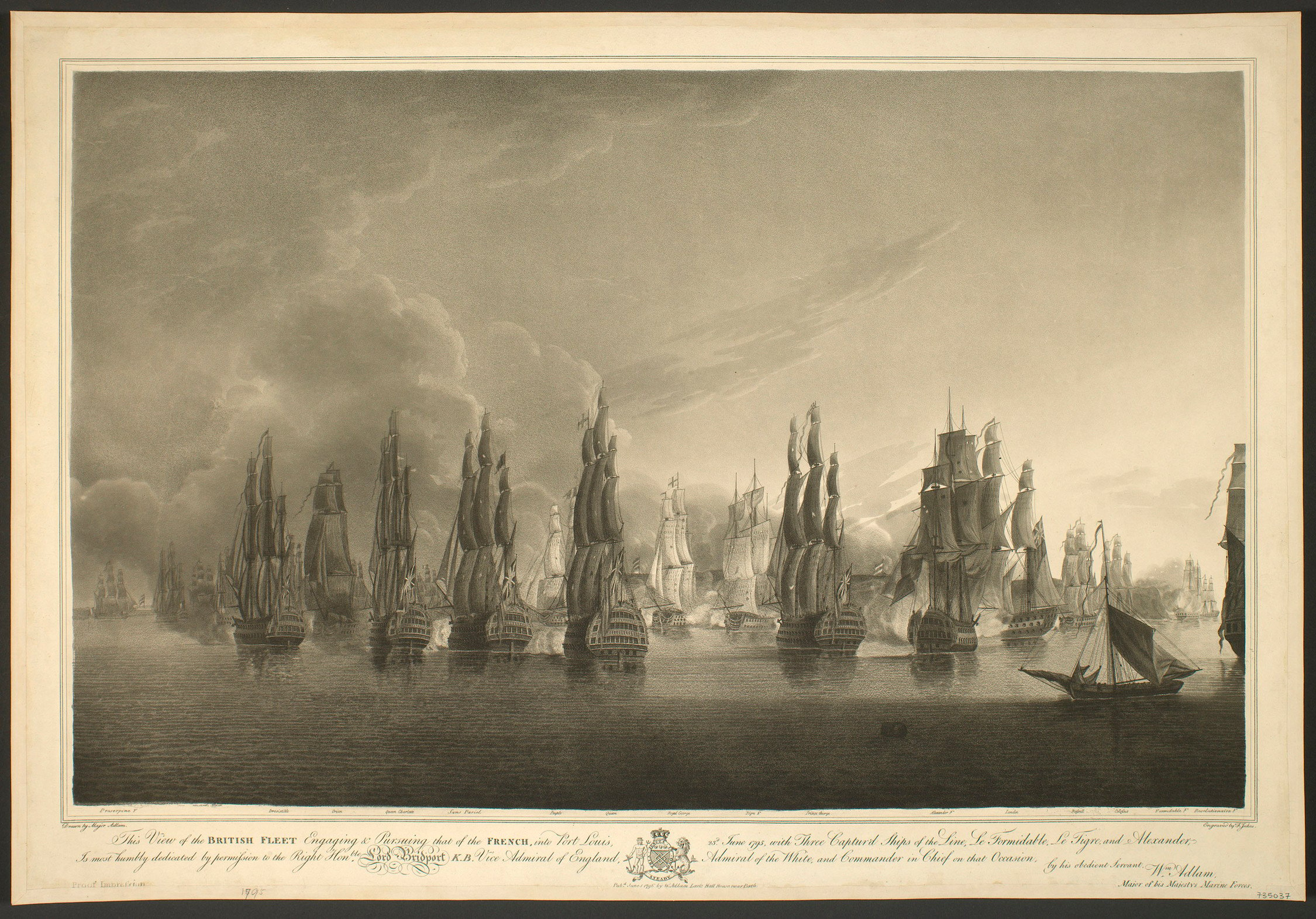
William Adlam: View of the British fleet at Île de Groix, 1796

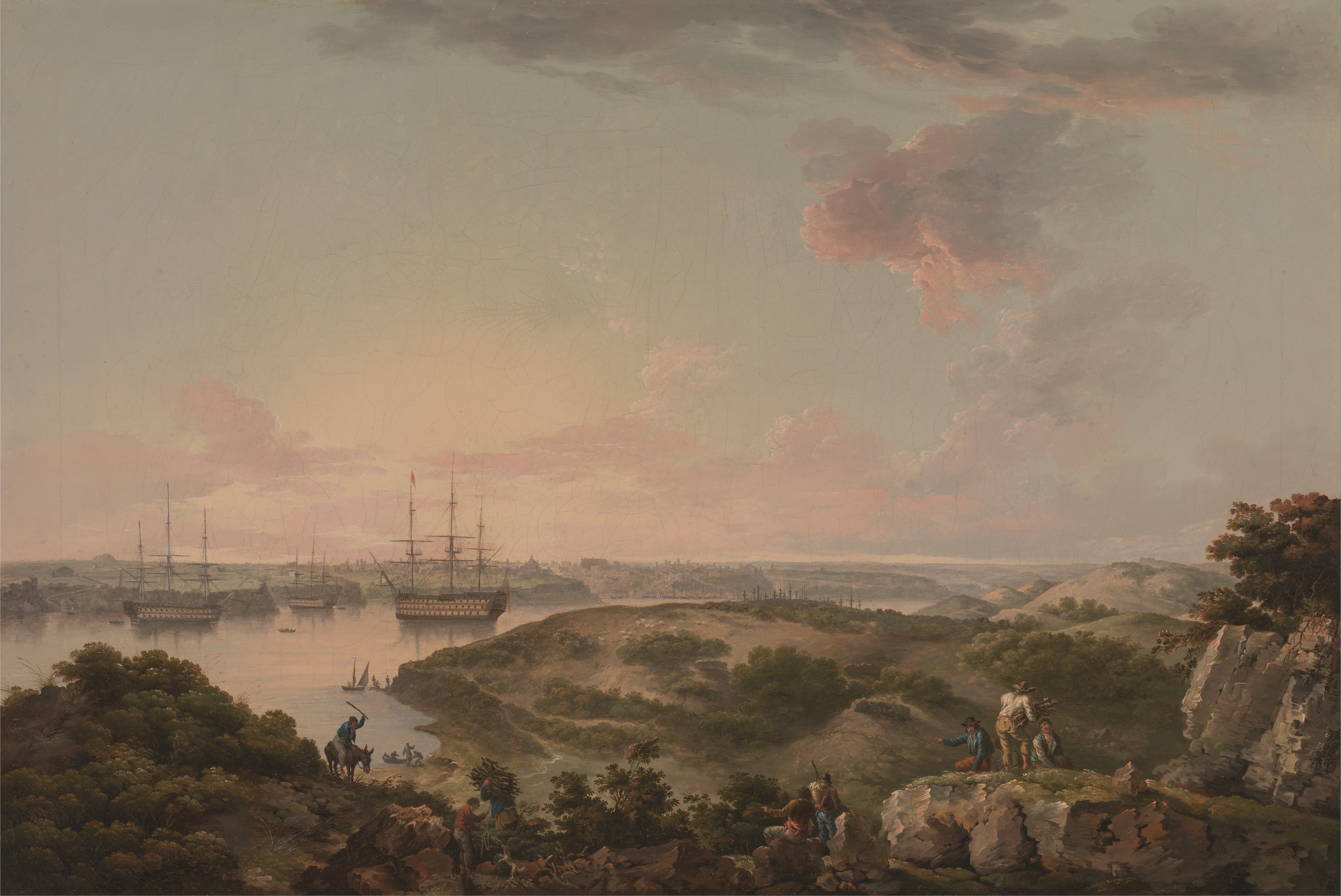
J. T. Serres: Port Mahon, Minorca, British Men-of-War at Anchor, c. 1795

Richard Poulden, a native of Portsea, was born in 1766, and early in life adopted the naval profession. He entered the Royal Navy on 22 July 1776, as Captain's Servant, on board the Hector, 74 guns, Captain Sir John Hamilton, on the Home station, where he continued employed as Midshipman in the Cambridge, 74 guns, Captain Francis John Hartwell, and Diligente sloop, Captain Anthony Hunt, until transferred, in October 1780, to the Barfleur, 90 guns, fitting for the flag of Sir Samuel Hood, under whom, on arriving in the West Indies, he fought in a partial action with the Comte de Grasse on 29 April 1781. On 8 January 1782 he was nominated, by Hood, Acting-Lieutenant of the Alfred, 74 guns, Captains William Bain, Robert Barber, and Thomas Dumaresq; to which ship the Admiralty confirmed him on 12 February 1783. He returned to England in July 1784, and was subsequently appointed, on the Home and Mediterranean stations; in March 1788, to the Thorn sloop, Captains William Taylor and John Woodley; on 27 September 1791 and 11 February 1793, to the Spitfire and Nemesis, both commanded by Captain John Woodley; in September 1793, to the Alcide, 74 guns, successive flag-ship of Admirals Robert Linzee and Philip Cosby, and under Cosby he co-operated in the reduction of Corsica; and on 21 January 1795, to the Irresistible, 74 guns, Captains John Leigh Douglas and Richard Grindall, part of Lord Bridport's fleet in the action off the Ile de Groix. On that occasion, Captain Grindall having been wounded, the charge of the ship devolved upon Poulden; whose promotion to the rank of Commander was in consequence effected by a commission dated 29 June 1795.

In October 1796 he was sent as Principal Agent for Transports to the river Elbe, for the purpose of embarking the foreign corps, with which he afterwards accompanied Sir Hugh Cloberry Christian to the West Indies. Being next, in November 1797, appointed to the Calcutta, 24 guns, Captain Poulden was present in that ship, again in the capacity of Principal Transport Agent, at the reduction of the island of Minorca, where he remained, in charge of the dockyard at Port Mahon, until the arrival of Commissioner Isaac Coffin. Quitting the Calcutta in August 1799, he assumed command, on 12 March 1801, of the Alkmaar, 50 guns; in which ship he remained, until September 1802, employed on the Home, Baltic, and West India stations.

Having attained Post rank on 29 April 1802, he was afterwards appointed; on 23 March 1803, to the Superintendence of the Rendezvous for seamen at Whitby, in Yorkshire; on 19 September 1805, to the Sea Fencible service; and, on 14 July 1810, to the office of Principal Agent for Transports at Lisbon, where he remained until April 1815. He became a Rear-Admiral on the Retired List on 10 January 1837; and on the Active on 17 August 1840. (Note: O'Byrne says he was Rear-Admiral of the Red, but The London Gazette for 18 August 1840 says he was to be Rear-Admiral of the White.) He died on 16 March 1845, at his residence, Richmond Hill, Clifton, in his eightieth year.

== Sources ==
- "Died". Hampshire Telegraph and Sussex Chronicle. 22 March 1845. p. 4, col. 5.
- "Obituary of Eminent Persons Recently Deceased / Admiral Poulden". The Illustrated London News, 6(153). 5 April 1845. pp. 213–214.
- "To be Rear Admirals of the White". The London Gazette, No. 19885. 18 August 1840. p. 1903.

Attribution:

- O'Byrne, William R. (1849). "Poulden, Richard". A Naval Biographical Dictionary. London: John Murray. p. 917.
