= Falklands Crisis of 1770 =

Dispute over the Falkland Islands between Great Britain and Spain

- Date: 1770
- Location: Falkland Islands
- Result: Diplomatic victory for Great Britain

Parties
Spain; France	Great Britain

Lead figures
Jerónimo Grimaldi; Duc de Choiseul	(Kingdom of Great Britain) Edward Hawke

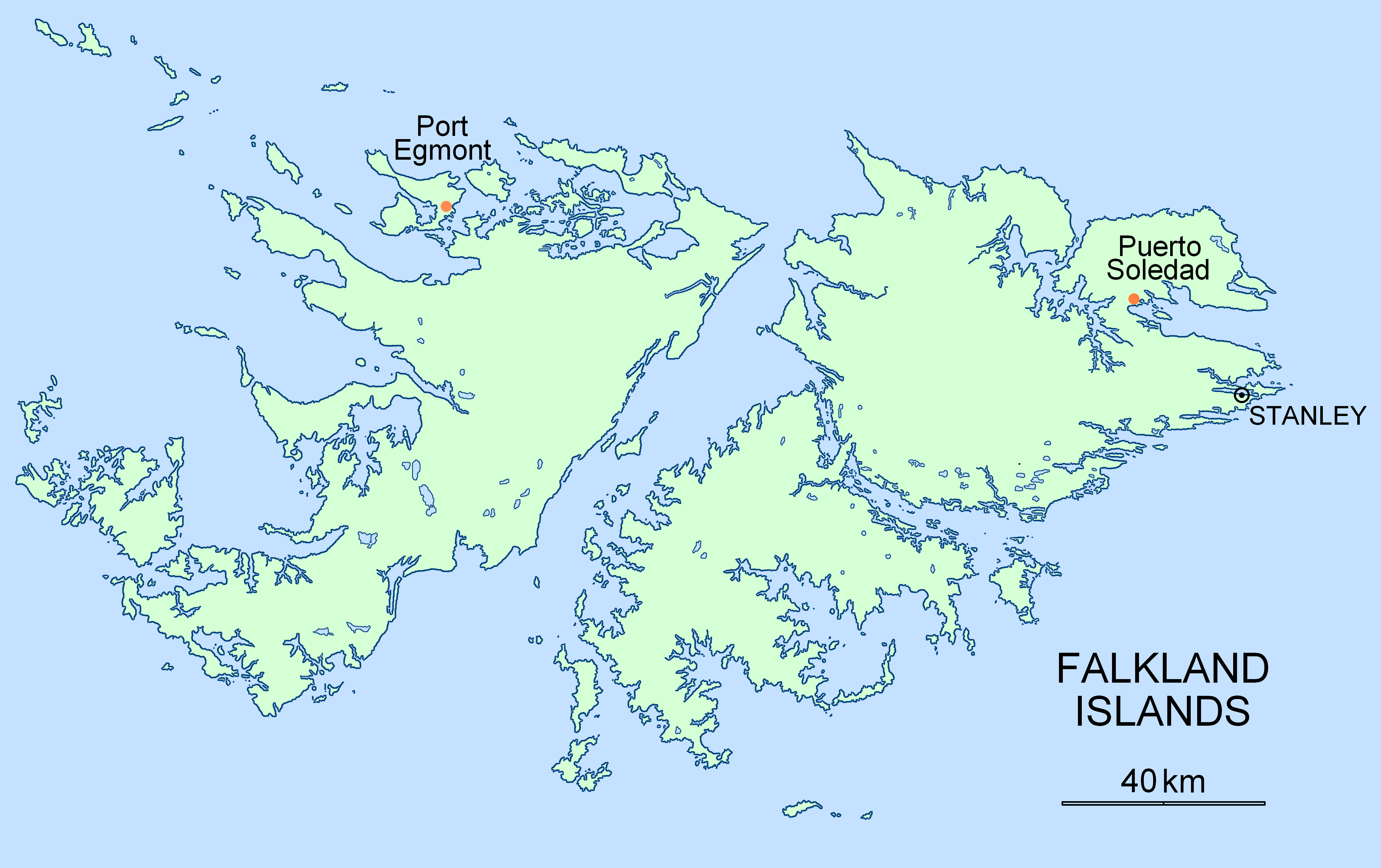
Map of the Falkland Islands

The Falklands Crisis of 1770, a diplomatic standoff between Great Britain and Spain, occurred over possession of the Falkland Islands in the South Atlantic Ocean. These events almost caused a war between Spain—backed by France—and Britain, and all three countries were poised to dispatch armed fleets to defend the rival claims to sovereignty of the barren but strategically important islands.

Ultimately, a lack of substantive French support deprived Spain of any help, and facing the Royal Navy alone, Madrid backed down and opened talks. The British thus managed to gain a diplomatic victory, and reached an inconclusive compromise with Spain in which both nations maintained their settlements but neither relinquished its claim of sovereignty over the islands.

== Background ==
Several British and Spanish historians maintain that their own explorers discovered the islands, leading to claims from both sides on the grounds of prior discovery. In January 1690, English sailor John Strong, captain of the Welfare, sailed between the two principal islands and called the passage "Falkland Channel" (now Falkland Sound), after Anthony Cary, 5th Viscount Falkland. The island group later took its English name from this body of water. Early sightings of "Pepys' Island" were later determined to be a mis-mapped part of the Falklands group, which were still occasionally referred to as the Pepysian Islands.

During the 17th century, the English government was to make a claim, but it was only in 1748—with the report of Admiral Lord Anson—that London began to give the matter its serious attention. Spanish objections to a planned British expedition had the effect of drawing up the battle lines and the matter was put to one side for the time being. An uncertain equilibrium might have remained, but for the unexpected intervention of a third party: France.

After the conclusion of the Seven Years' War, the French were eager to improve their position in the South Atlantic. Louis de Bougainville had, at his own expense, settled a party of Acadians at Berkeley Sound on East Falkland in February 1764 (now Port Louis), returning with more colonists and supplies in 1765.

In January 1765, unbeknown to the French, the British, under John Byron, surveyed and claimed the Falklands, and decided that Port Egmont on the western island was the best site for a base. Britain's Cabinet, acting on a July 1765 report by Lord Egmont, immediately following Byron's report reaching him in June via the storeship Florida, decided to establish a base at Port Egmont and dispatched Captain John McBride and a company of marines in October 1765.

Responding to Spanish pressure on learning of Bougainville's settlement, the French reluctantly handed over Port Louis to their closest ally on 1 April 1767, and it was renamed Puerto Soledad.

In June, Byron's return alerted Spain to Britain's various activities in the South Atlantic. Extensive negotiations, demands, and counter-claims ensued between Spain's ambassador Masserano and Britain's new (July 1766) government's Southern Secretary of State, the Earl of Shelburne, which dragged on for some years without progress, beyond clear communication by Britain that it regarded Spain's old rights by Papal Bull (all of the South Atlantic and all of the Pacific Ocean through to the Philippines) as defunct. As Shelburne recorded one response to Masserano in his notes:

The right of Navigation was so indisputably of our side that I could not consent to talk seriously upon it. That if the Spaniards talking of their possessions included the A[merican] & S[outh] Seas, and that our navigating there gave occasion to them to Suspect a War, I had no hesitation to say that I would advise one if they insisted on reviving such a vague & strange pretension, long since wore out, as the exclusive right of those Seas.

== Crisis ==
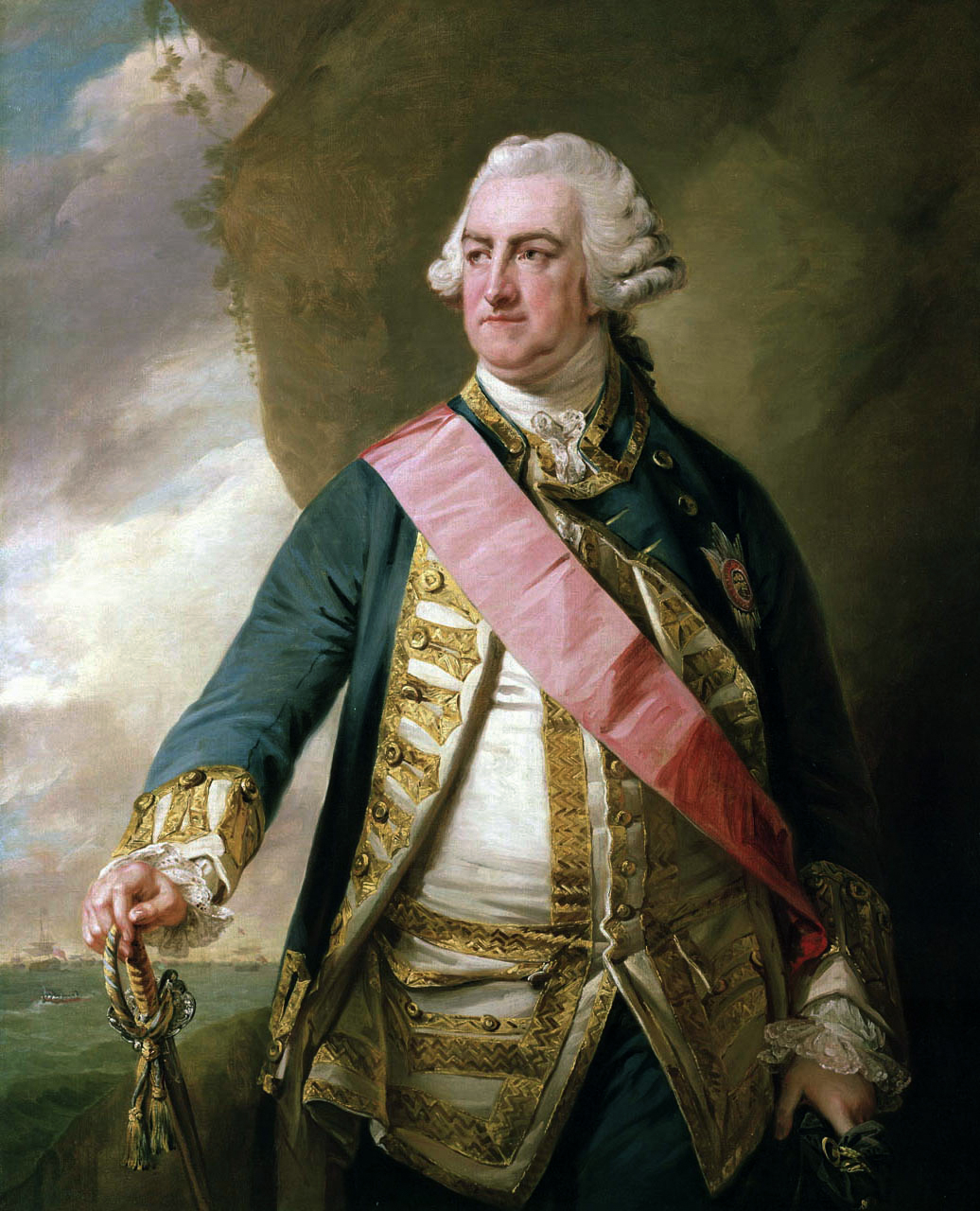
Edward Hawke, 1st Baron Hawke the First Lord of the Admiralty who mobilised the Royal Navy during the crisis.

In June 1770, the Spanish governor of Buenos Aires, Francisco de Paula Bucareli y Ursua, sent five frigates under General Juan Ignacio de Madariaga to Port Egmont. On 4 June, a Spanish frigate anchored in the harbour; she was presently followed by four others, containing some 1400 marines. The small British force was under the command of Commander George Farmer. Madariaga wrote to Farmer on 10 June that having with him fourteen hundred troops and a train of artillery, he was in a position to compel the English to quit, if they hesitated any longer. Farmer replied that he should defend himself to the best of his power; but when the Spaniards landed, after firing his guns, Farmer capitulated on terms, an inventory of the stores being taken, and the British were permitted to return to their country in the Favourite.

=== Response ===
When Parliament assembled in November, the MPs, outraged by this insult to national honour, demanded action from the North government. Many were angered by what they saw as Britain's failure to prevent France from annexing Corsica in 1768 and feared a similar situation occurring in the Falklands. The Foreign Office "began to mobilise for a potential war".

Amid this flurry of threats and counter-threats, the Spanish attempted to strengthen their position by winning the support of France, invoking the Pacte de Famille between the two Bourbon crowns. For a time it looked as if all three countries were about to go to war, especially as the Duc de Choiseul, the French minister of war and foreign affairs, was in a militant mood (he had advised the Spanish government at the beginning of 1767 that France would not be ready for naval war before 1770). But Louis XV took fright, telling his cousin Charles III that "My minister wishes for war, but I do not." Choiseul was dismissed from office, retiring to his estates. Without French support Charles and his government were forced to back down and Louis even pressed Charles to make concessions to the British.

=== Compromise ===
The crisis was resolved when Lord North, now Britain's Prime Minister, secretly offered to abandon Port Egmont if Spain first restored it. This was satisfactory; both were done:

On 22 January 1771, the Prince of Masserano (ambassador of the Spanish Court) delivered a declaration, in which the King of Spain "disavows the violent enterprise of Bucareli," and promises "to restore the port and fort called Egmont, with all the artillery and stores, according to the inventory." The agreement also stated: "this engagement to restore port Egmont cannot, nor ought, in any wise, to affect the question of the prior right of sovereignty of the Malouine, otherwise called Falkland's islands."

This concession was accepted by the Earl of Rochford, who declared that he was authorised "to offer, in his majesty's name, to the King of Great Britain, a satisfaction for the injury done him, by dispossessing him of port Egmont;" and, having signed a declaration, expressing that Spain "disavows the expedition against port Egmont, and engages to restore it, in the state in which it stood before the 10th of June, 1770, his Britannick majesty will look upon the said declaration, together with the full performance of the engagement on the part of his catholick majesty, as a satisfaction for the injury done to the crown of Great Britain."

== Aftermath ==
The British reestablished their base at Port Egmont when Captain John Stott with the ships HMS Juno, HMS Hound and HMS Florida arrived. The port became an important stop for ships going around Cape Horn but was abandoned in 1774 during the reorganisation forced by the approaching American Revolution.

Although the question of sovereignty was sidestepped, it would become a source of future trouble. Samuel Johnson described the implications of the crisis in his pamphlet "Thoughts on the late Transactions Respecting Falkland's Islands", looking at the British problem in holding such remote islands against a hostile mainland: "a colony that could never become independent, for it could never be able to maintain itself."

For the British the crisis was a victory of diplomacy—a successful naval mobilisation which they were well prepared to mobilise, unlike France or Spain, and they used the situation to apply the greatest possible diplomatic leverage over both nations. As a result, the crisis greatly strengthened the position of the British Prime Minister Lord North, and fostered a belief during the American War of Independence that France would not dare to intervene in British colonial affairs. Conversely, the crisis was a humiliation for both France and Spain. For France in particular, it effectively ended the career of Choiseul, who would hold no subsequent position in the French government. However, Vergennes soon rose to power and held similar views to Choiseul on the necessity on reversing Britain's gains in the Seven Years' War to restore the balance of power, setting the scene for a future role of France in the American Revolutionary War.

Twenty years later in a similar situation Spain asked for French support in the Nootka Crisis (present-day British Columbia). This would also end up in favour of the British after another successful mobilisation of their navy and French refusal for support, leading to Spain again backing down.

== See also ==
- Antonio de Vea expedition
- Coastal defence of colonial Chile
- Falkland Islands sovereignty dispute
- History of the Falkland Islands
- Reassertion of British sovereignty over the Falkland Islands (1833)
- Timeline of the history of the Falkland Islands
