= I'Anson (musician) =

British musical artist

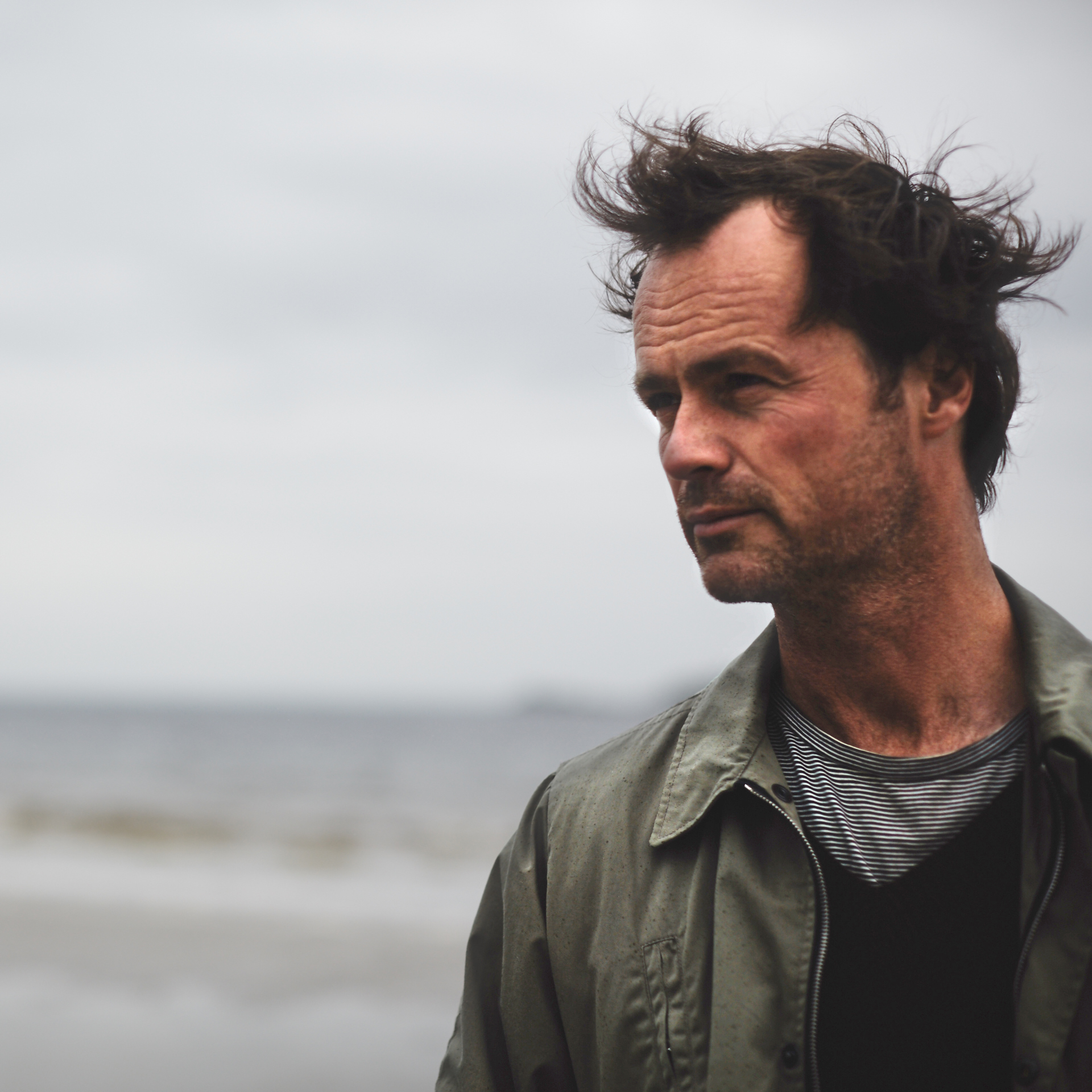
- I'Anson in 2014

Background information
- Born: Hugh Carswell; Gateshead, England
- Genres: Ambient; New-Age; Alternative rock; Acoustic
- Website: iansonmusic.com

I'Anson, real name Hugh Carswell, is a British musician.

== Origins ==
Hugh Carswell was born in Gateshead and grew up in Rugby. After an apprenticeship as an engineer and various jobs, he became director of London-based brand agency Park Avenue. In 2007, he moved to the island of Jura, where he restored the family's cottage, the place in which he started to record his music. His stage names comes from his grandfather, the writer and poet Hugh I'Anson Fausset.

In Chances of Light, I'Anson's debut album, was released on 4 November 2013 on the independent label Maker and distributed by Burning Shed. I'Anson has defined the album's songs as "very much of Jura and about Jura". The album has seen the collaboration, among others, of Steve Jansen and the Scottish Ensemble.
