= Victor Philip Ferrero Fieschi, Prince of Masserano =

Italian naturalized Spanish nobleman, soldier and diplomat

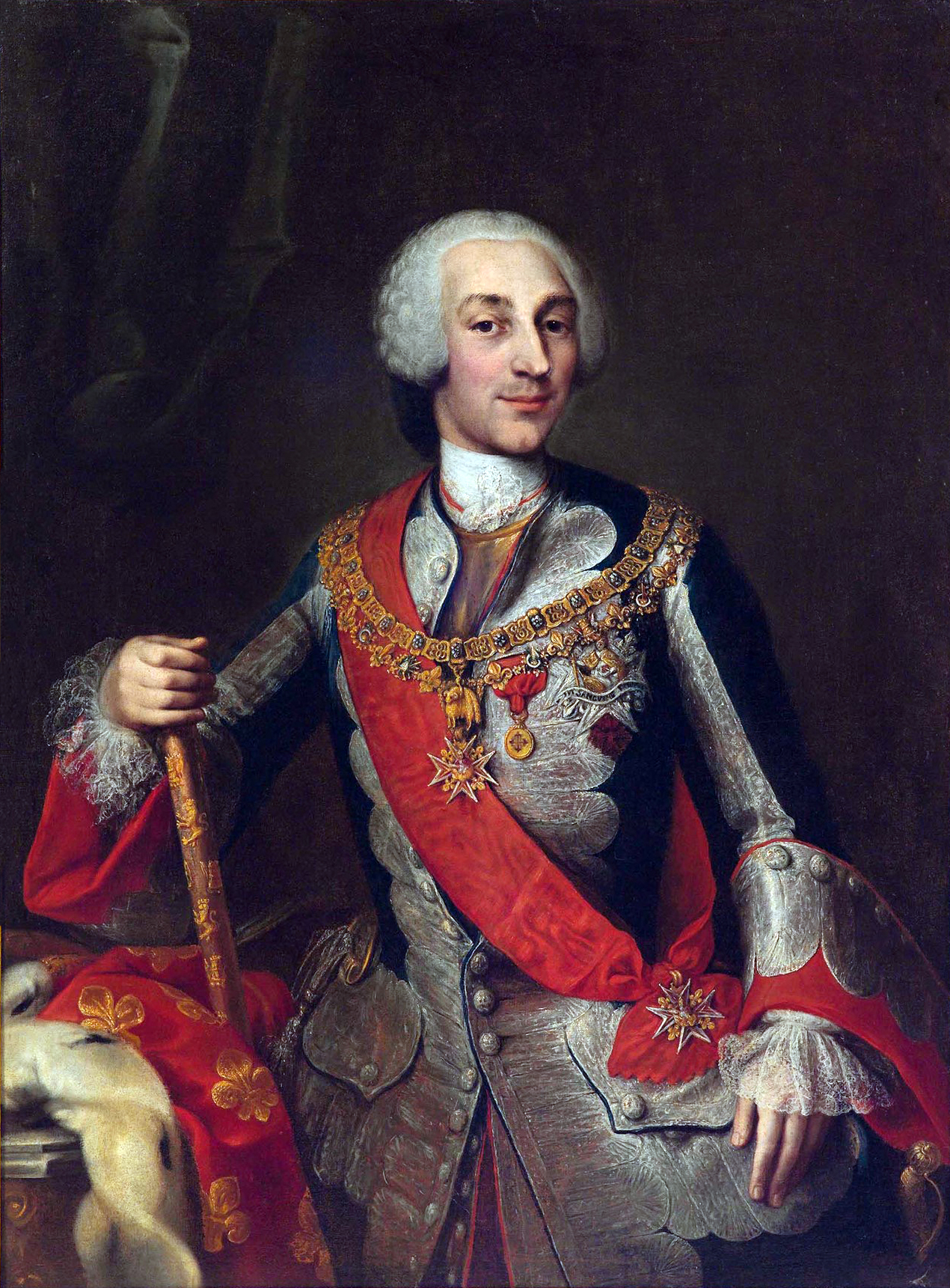
Vittorio Filippo Ferrero-Fieschi, prince of Masserano

Vittorio Filippo Ferrero-Fieschi (Spanish: Felipe Víctor Ferrero Fieschi; 20 October 1713 in Madrid – 26 October 1777 in Barcelona) was an Italian naturalized Spanish nobleman, soldier and diplomat in the service of the Kingdom of Spain. He was the Spanish Ambassador to the United Kingdom, and the last effective prince of Masserano and marquis of Crevacuore.

== Biography ==
He was the son of Victor Amadeo (1687–1743), 5th Prince of Maserano, and Juana Irene Caracciolo y Ruffo (1697–1721), from a well-known Neapolitan family. Originally from Piedmont, his father had entered the service of Spain and managed to become a relevant figure in the Court of Madrid, becoming Grandee of Spain, Knight in the Order of the Golden Fleece, captain general and ambassador.

Victor Philip entered the Spanish Army at the age of 13, served in Italy in 1742 under Montemar and had reached the rank of in Lieutenant general by 1745. He then remained at the Spanish Court as Gentleman of the chamber of the King and Captain of Life guards. He was elected a Knight of the Golden Fleece on 22 September 1752.

Thanks to the rise to power of his friend Jerónimo Grimaldi, he was appointed as Spanish Ambassador in London on 14 October 1763.

His mission was broad and complex. The Seven Years' War had just ended with the Treaty of Paris and he had to negotiate the execution of the peace treaty. At the same time, he had to try to put a stop to the English usurpations in the Americas, and to agree the details of the return of Manilla to Spain after the British occupation of Manila (1762–1764). He always acted in full agreement with Grimaldi, maintaining with him not only the usual diplomatic correspondence, but also a continuous exchange of confidential letters.

In 1770, he was faced by the Falkland Crisis, which brought Spain and England on the brink of a new war. Fulfilling the orders of his Court, he signed in London with the Earl of Rochford the declaration of 22 January 1771, which satisfied a large part of the English claims. Tired and already ill, he returned to Spain between 1772 and 1775. Returning to London at the end of May 1775, he had to defend Spain against accusations of active sympathies for the rebels in the American colonies.

The resignation of his patron Grimaldi in November 1776) was a very hard blow for him. Increasingly ill, he requested and obtained the permission to return to Spain to restore his health. He left London on 16 September 1777, and arrived in Barcelona on 19 October, where he died a week later. He was buried in the church of San Miguel.

=== Marriage and Children ===
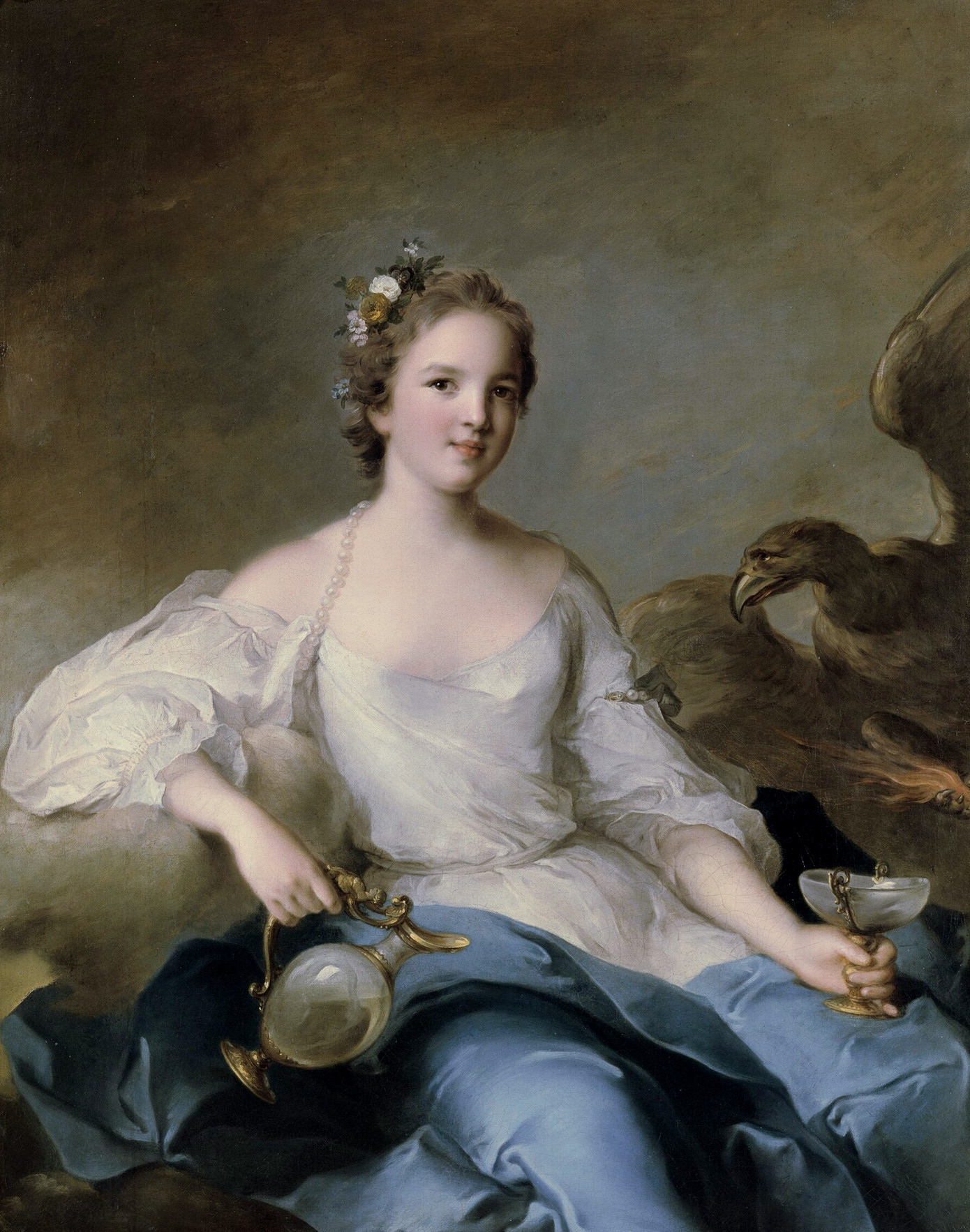
His wife, Charlotte Louise de Rohan

On 26 October 1737 he married Charlotte Louise de Rohan (1722–1786), daughter of Hercule Mériadec, Prince of Guéméné and Louise de Rohan, with whom he had :

- stillborn daughter (1740)
- Ferdinando Antonio (1746–1746)
- Carlo Sebastiano (1760–1826), Ambassador of Spain in Paris, Golden Fleece, had issue.

On 20 March 1767 Vittorio Filippo had sold the principality of Masserano and marquisate of Crevacuore to Savoy for 400,000 lire, retaining only the hereditary titles.

== Sources ==
- Real Academia de la Historia
- Vittorio Filippo Ferrero Fieschi, principe di Masserano
- Principato di Masserano
