= Francisco de Paula Bucareli =

Spanish colonial administrator

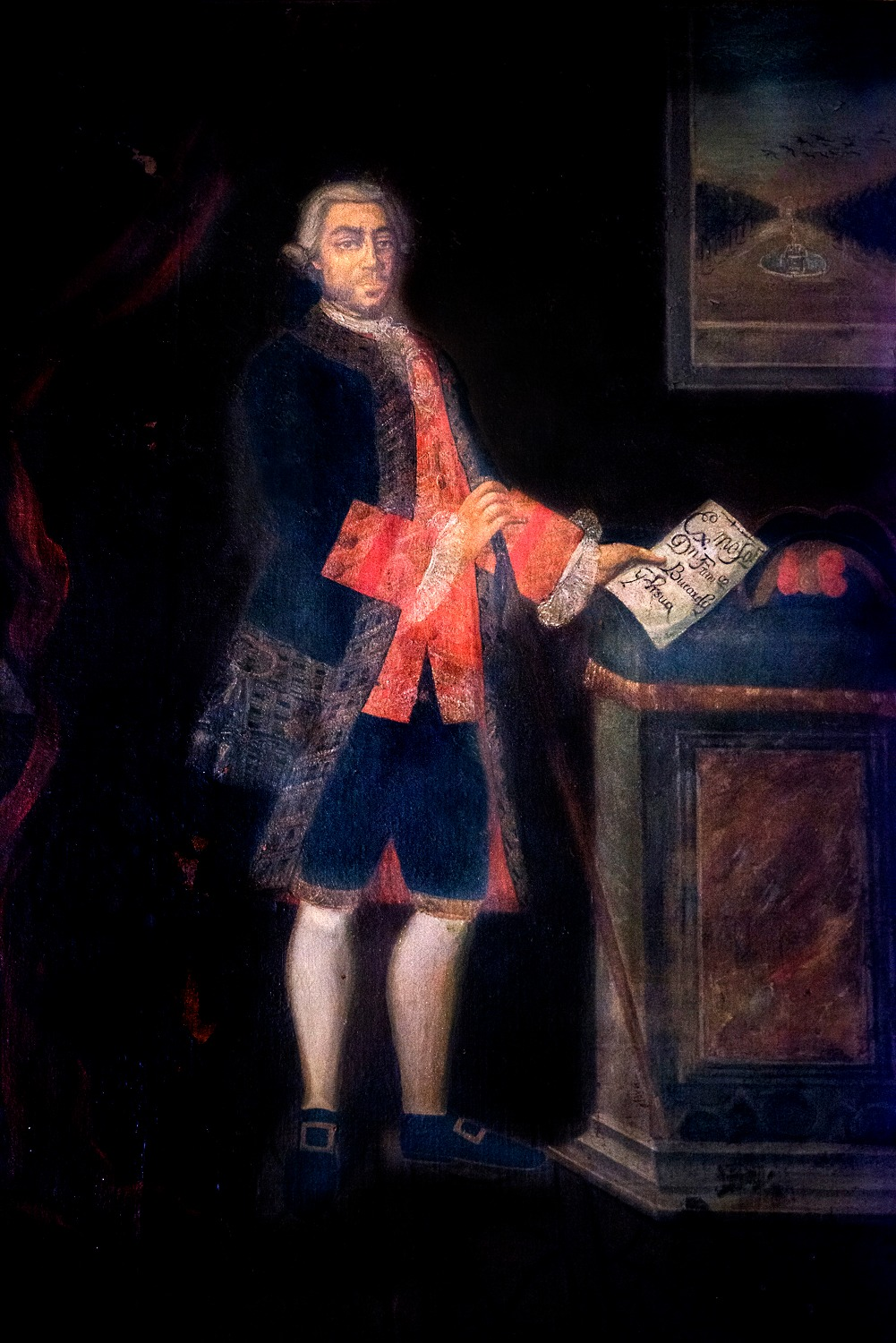
Portrait of Bucareli

Francisco de Paula Bucareli y Ursúa (18 September 1708 – April 1780) was a Spanish colonial administrator who served as the governor of the Rio de la Plata from 1766 to 1770 and viceroy of Navarre from 1773 to 1780.

== Biography ==
=== Youth ===
He was the fourth son of a family of Seville nobility. His father was Luis José Bucareli y Henestrosa (1675-1740), second Marquis of Vallehermoso, and his mother was Ana de Ursúa y Lasso de la Vega (1686-1759), fourth Countess of Gerena. One of his brothers was Antonio María de Bucareli, Governor of Cuba, and Viceroy of New Spain.

As Governor of Navarra, he had dealings with the Jesuits.

=== Eviction of the Jesuits from Rio de la Plata ===
In December 1765, he was named Governor of the Rio de la Plata, based in Buenos Aires, where he arrived in August 1766. Beforehand, the Esquilache Riots had taken place in Madrid, which were blamed on the Jesuits. King Charles III decided to expel the Jesuits from his Empire and gave instructions to Bucareli directly before his departure, to expel the Jesuits from the Governorate of the Río de la Plata. He had to pass the order to the Governor of Chile, the Audiencia of Charcas and the Viceroyalty of Peru for them to do likewise.

In carrying out the King's orders, which he did personally, he set out in May 1768 in command of a military expedition that went up the Uruguay River with 1,500 soldiers. He arrived in El Salto on 16 June 1768, from where he dismantled the 33 Jesuit missions among the Guaraní, detained the Jesuit priests, sent them to Buenos Aires, and from there to Spain.

=== Falkland Crisis ===
In 1770, Bucareli sailed to the Falkland Islands with five warships and captured the British settlement at Port Egmont, evicting its inhabitants. Charles III condemned his actions and Port Egmont was returned to the British.

=== Viceroy of Navarre ===
Bucareli's position in Rio de la Plata had become untenable and he was recalled to Spain. He spent some time in the Duchy of Parma and Piacenza in Italy, until 23 February 1773, when he was named Viceroy of Navarre. He took up his office in the Palace of Olite and remained Viceroy until his death in 1780.

== Bibliography ==
- Jackson, Robert H. (2021). A Visual Catalog of Jesuit Missions in Spanish America. Google Books: Cambridge Scholars Publishing. ISBN 9781527564190.
