= Hugh I'Anson Fausset =

Hugh I'Anson Fausset (16 June 1895 – 1965), was an English writer, a literary critic and biographer, and a poet and religious writer. His mother was Ethel I'Anson, of Darlington, Durham, descended from Joshua I'Anson who established the Darlington I'Anson line in 1749.

His father was the Rev. Robert Thomas Edward Fausset, of Killington, then in Westmorland, who was the son of Andrew Robert Fausset. Hugh Fausset was educated at Sedbergh School and Corpus Christi College, Cambridge, and then at as a choral scholar at King's College, Cambridge.

Fausset worked at the Foreign Office, during the summer of 1918. In 1919 he became a reviewer and writer. He was a correspondent of John Freeman.

Fausset wrote for The Times Literary Supplement and The Manchester Guardian, as well as for other periodicals. He married Marjory Rolfe, daughter of the Rev. G. W. Rolfe.

== Works ==
- Youth and Sensibility (1917) (poems)
- The Healing of Heaven (1920) (lyrical drama)
- The Spirit of Love (1921) (sonnet sequence)
- The Condemned: Two Poems of Crisis (1922)
- Keats: A Study in Development (1922)
- Tennyson: A Modern Portrait (1923)
- Studies in Idealism (1923)
- Before the Dawn (1924) (poems)
- John Donne: A Study in Discord (1924)
- Samuel Taylor Coleridge (1926)
- Tolstoy: The Inner Drama (1927)
- William Cowper (1928)
- Tennyson: new and revised edition (1929)
- The Proving of Psyche (1929)
- Minor Poets of the Eighteenth Century (1930)
- The Modern Dilemma (1930)
- The Poems of John Donne (editor) (1931)
- Selected Poems of William Cowper (editor) (1931)
- The Lost Leader, A Study of Wordsworth (1933)
- A Modern Prelude (1933) (autobiography)
- Selected Letters of John Keats (editor) (1938)
- The Holy Sonnets of John Donne (editor) (1939)
- Walt Whitman: Poet of Democracy (1942)
- Between the Tides (1943) (novel)
- The Last Days (1945) (novel)
- Poets and Pundits (1947) (essays)
- Towards Fidelity (1952)
- The Flame and the Light: Meanings in Vedanta and Buddhism (1958)
- The Fruits of Silence (1963)
- The Lost Dimension (1966)
