= Puerto Soledad =

Spanish military outpost and penal colony on the Falkland Islands

Coordinates: 51.5289°S 58.1277°W

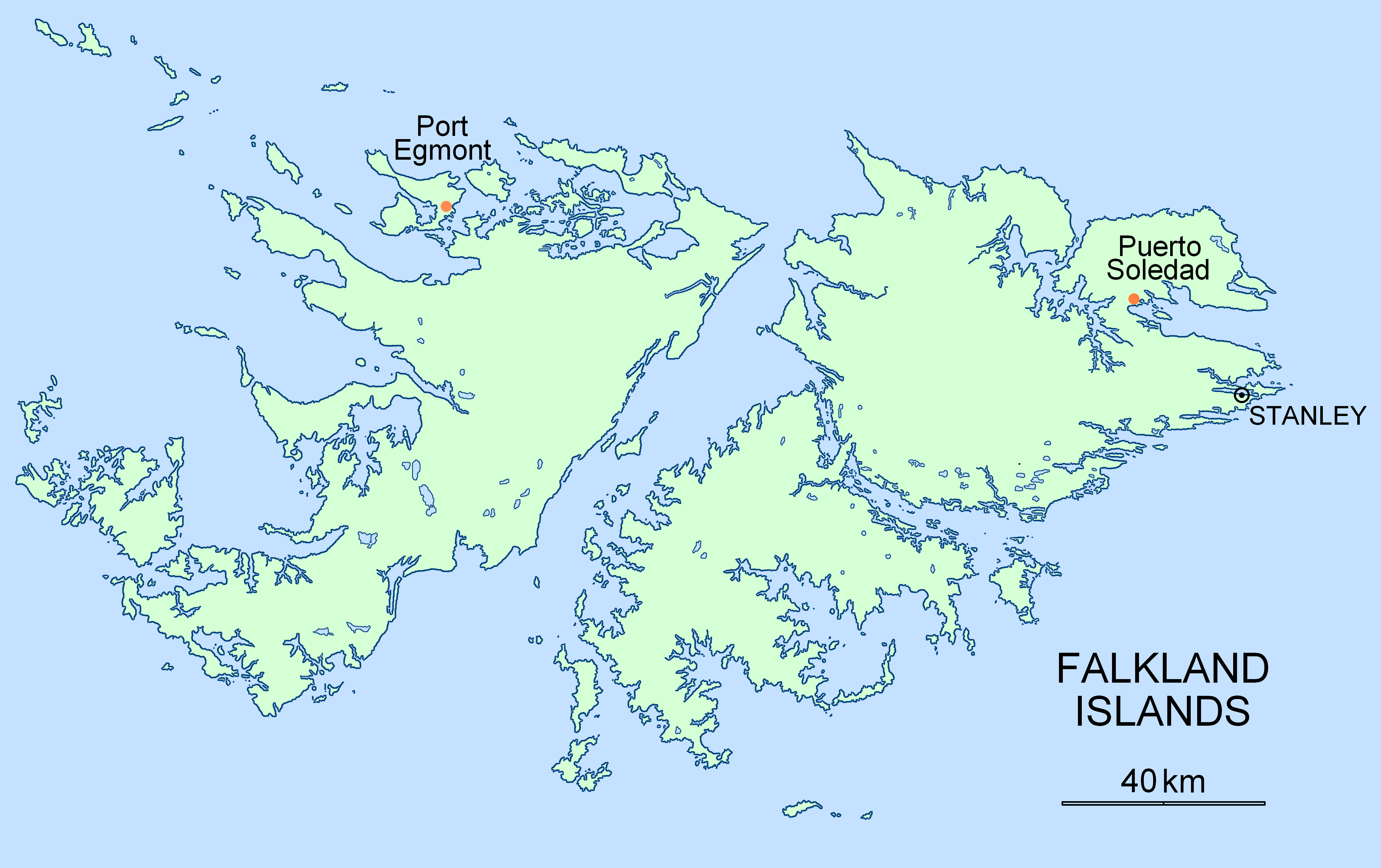
Location of Puerto Soledad, Falkland Islands

Puerto Soledad (Puerto de Nuestra Señora de la Soledad, English: Port Solitude) was a Spanish military outpost and penal colony on the Falkland Islands, situated at an inner cove of Berkeley Sound (French: Baie Accaron, Spanish: Bahía Anunciación).

== Port St. Louis ==
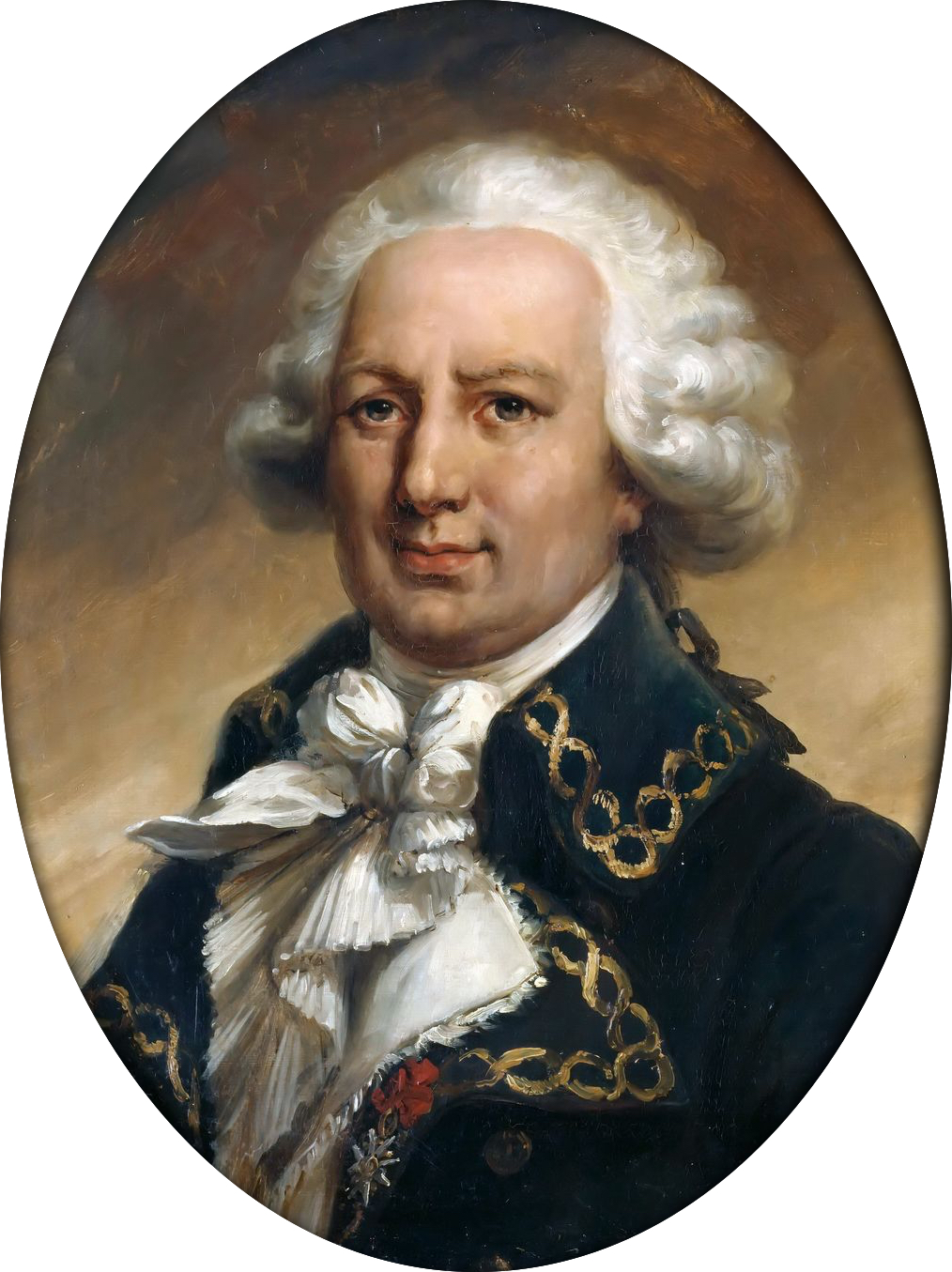
Louis Antoine de Bougainville

The settlement was established as a French colony under the name Port Saint Louis in 1764, and within a year reached a population of 75 (most of them Acadians), with three marriages and two births recorded (one of the births was François Benoit in 1764, son of Augustin Benoit and Françoise Thériault – apparently the first ever in the islands' history). After three years of French possession the settlement was ceded to Spain, and all the French settlers left to be replaced by Spaniards. Acting on personal instructions by King Carlos III, the Spanish Government reimbursed the founder of Port St. Louis, Louis Antoine de Bougainville, 618,108 French livres.

Bougainville himself sailed to Port Saint Louis on board the Boudeuse, accompanied by the Spanish ships Esmeralda and Liebre to hand the settlement over to Felipe Ruíz Puente, the first Spanish governor (1767–1773) of Puerto Soledad, as the settlement would become known. The ceremony took place on April 1, 1767, and from Puerto Soledad Bougainville set sail to make the first French circumnavigation of the world.

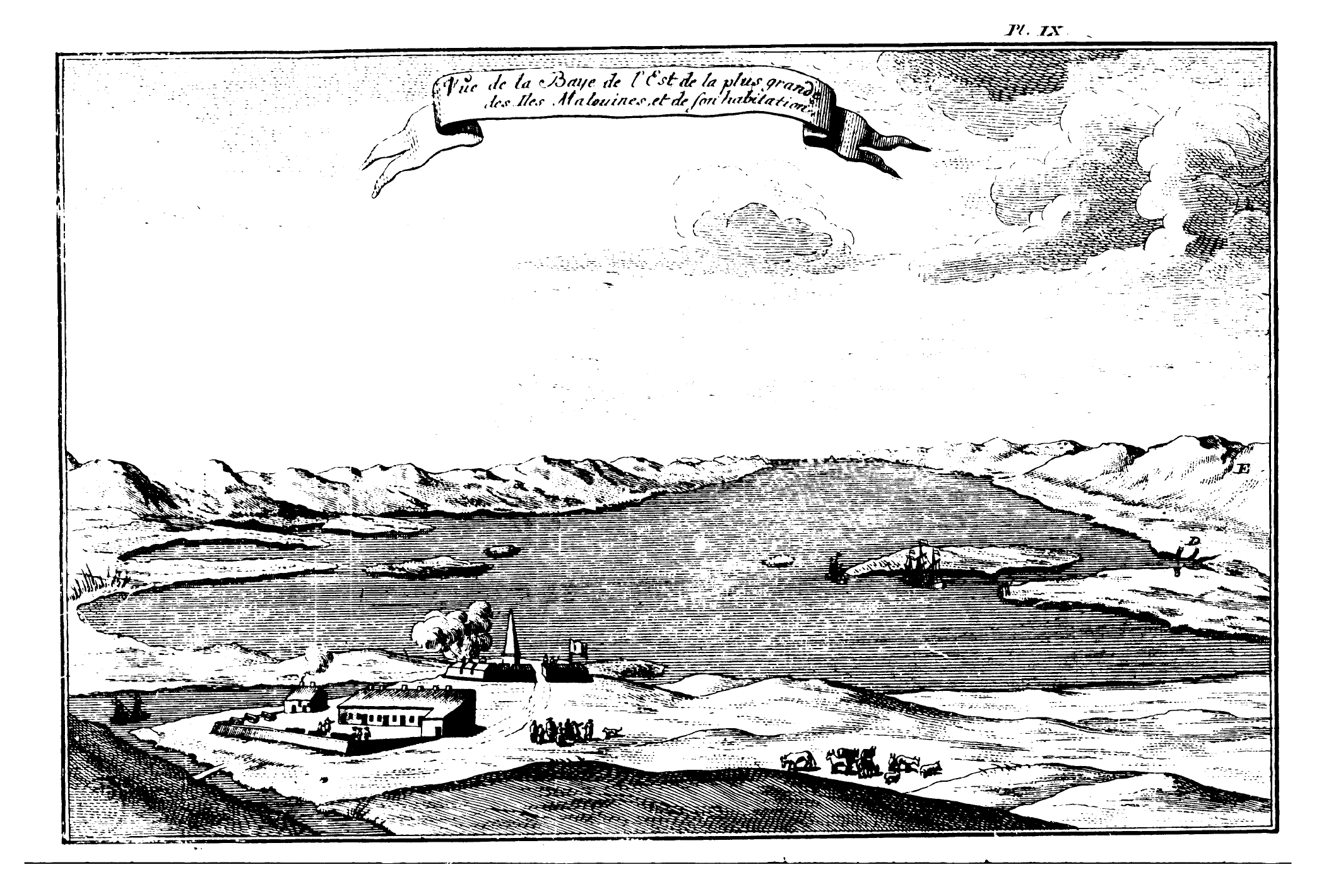
The original setting of Port Saint Louis and Puerto Soledad. Dom Pernety, 1769. (Looking eastwards).

== Puerto Soledad ==
Puerto Soledad had 103 residents in 1781: the governor, two priests, a treasury official, three officers, one surgeon, 50 soldiers, 43 convicts, one mason, and one baker. They occupied some 20 buildings including dwellings, barracks for officers, seamen, convicts and troops, chapel, hospital, kiln, blacksmith and carpenter shops, etc. Eventually the number of buildings increased to about 30 in 1811, with the population dropping to 46. The settlement was protected by three batteries: San Carlos (later renamed San Marcos), Santiago, and San Felipe Batteries. Supply ships came from Montevideo to Puerto Soledad on an annual basis during the summer, bringing relief and supplies. That supply line was temporarily severed during the war waged by Spain against Britain in 1805–1808, and the British occupation of Montevideo in 1807, causing considerable hardship to the Puerto Soledad residents.

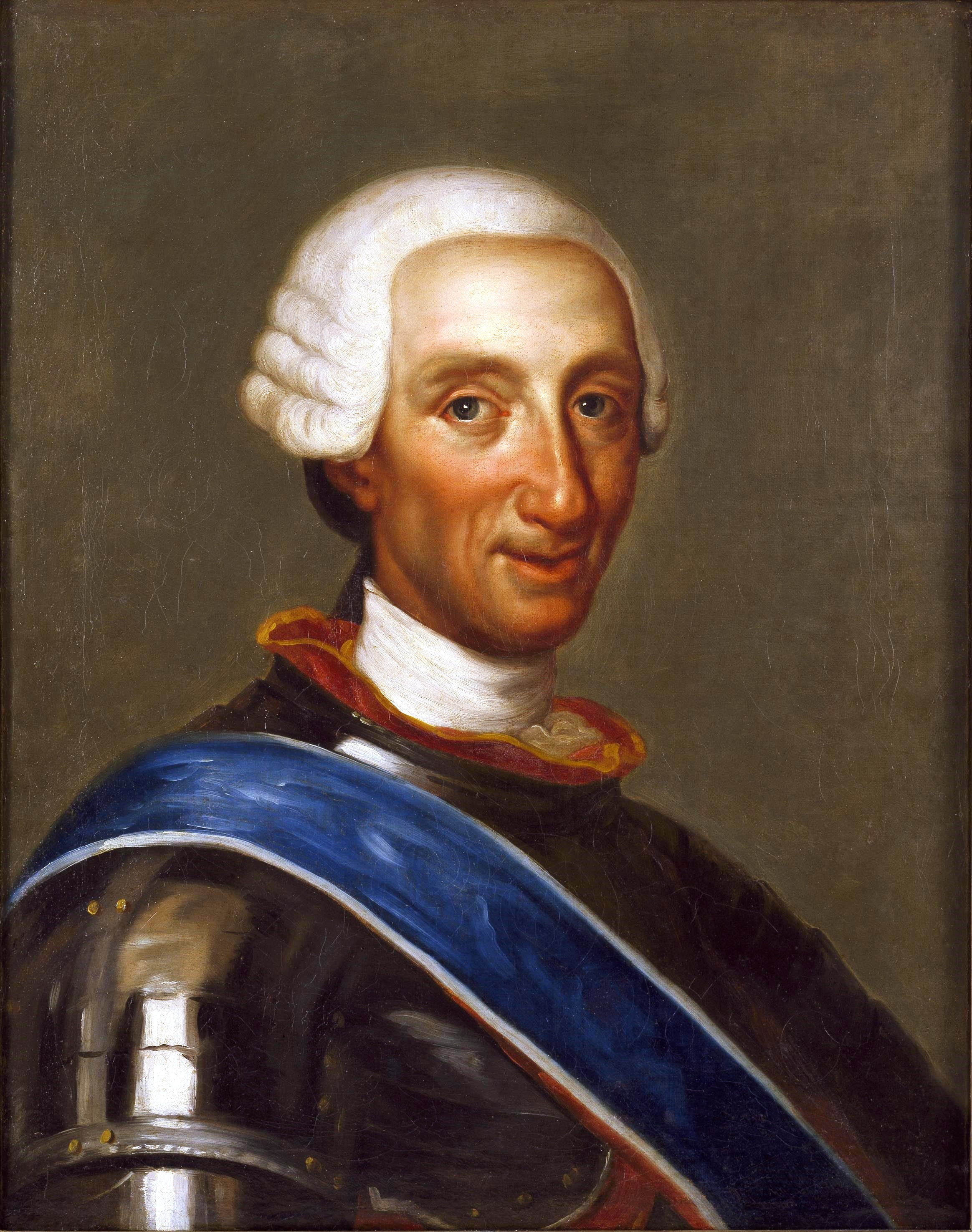
King Carlos III of Spain

An indispensable source of subsistence for the small colony – as well as for the numerous English and American sealers operating on the islands – was the feral cattle introduced by the French in 1764. There were 2,180 head of cattle and 166 horses in 1778. On festive occasions the Spaniards even had their favourite corridas de toro, such as during the three-day event organized by governor Ramón Clairac y Villalonga (1787–88, 1789–90) to celebrate King Carlos IV's accession to the throne when, along with allegiance formally sworn to the new monarch comedies were performed, and twelve bulls were fought.

Spain governed Puerto Soledad through its colonial administration in Buenos Aires. During its 44 years of existence the settlement had 21 governors (Spanish: gobernador y comandante marítimo) serving a total of 31 terms, mainly Spaniards excepting two South American criollos: Jacinto de Antolaguirre (1781–1783) born in Buenos Aires, and Francisco Javier de Viana y Alzaibár (1798–99, 1800–01) born in Montevideo. The governors were mainly naval officers with the exception of one drawn from the army.

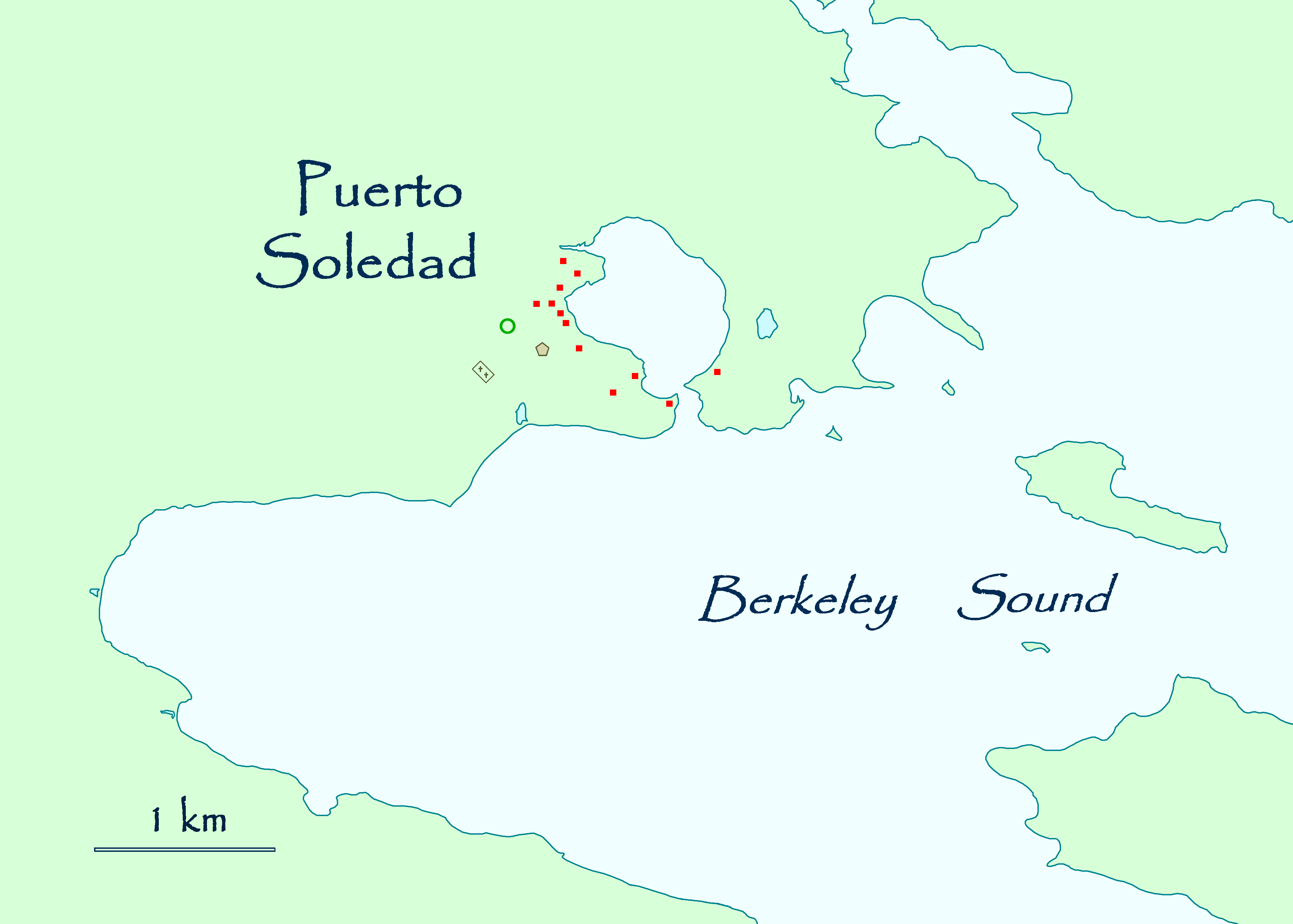
Map of Puerto Soledad; notice the pentagonal old fort, the corral, and the cemetery.

Following a decision by Viceroy Francisco Javier Elío, on February 13, 1811 all the troops and settlers of Puerto Soledad were evacuated on board the brigantine Galvez to Montevideo in order to fight his Buenos Airean adversaries. A lead plaque was left at the chapel of Puerto Soledad pleading possession of the island and the settlement for King Fernando VII of Spain.

== Puerto Luis ==
During the subsequent 17 years, the settlement, while frequented by sealers, had remained largely derelict, until Louis Vernet brought some settlers under the authority of Buenos Aires Province in 1828. Vernet, aware of British claims to the Falklands, had also sought permission for his expedition from the British consulate. That new settlement existed under the name Puerto Luis until 1833 when it was renamed first Anson's Harbour and eventually "Port Louis" by the British.

== Port Louis ==
Port Louis remained the sole settlement and administrative centre of the islands until the capital was moved to the newly established Stanley in 1845. After this, following a 17-year eventful and occasionally turbulent existence, the settlement declined in importance, eventually becoming a sheep farm.

== See also ==
- History of the Falkland Islands
- Port Egmont
