= HMS Tamar (1758) =

1758 Favourite-class sloop-of-war

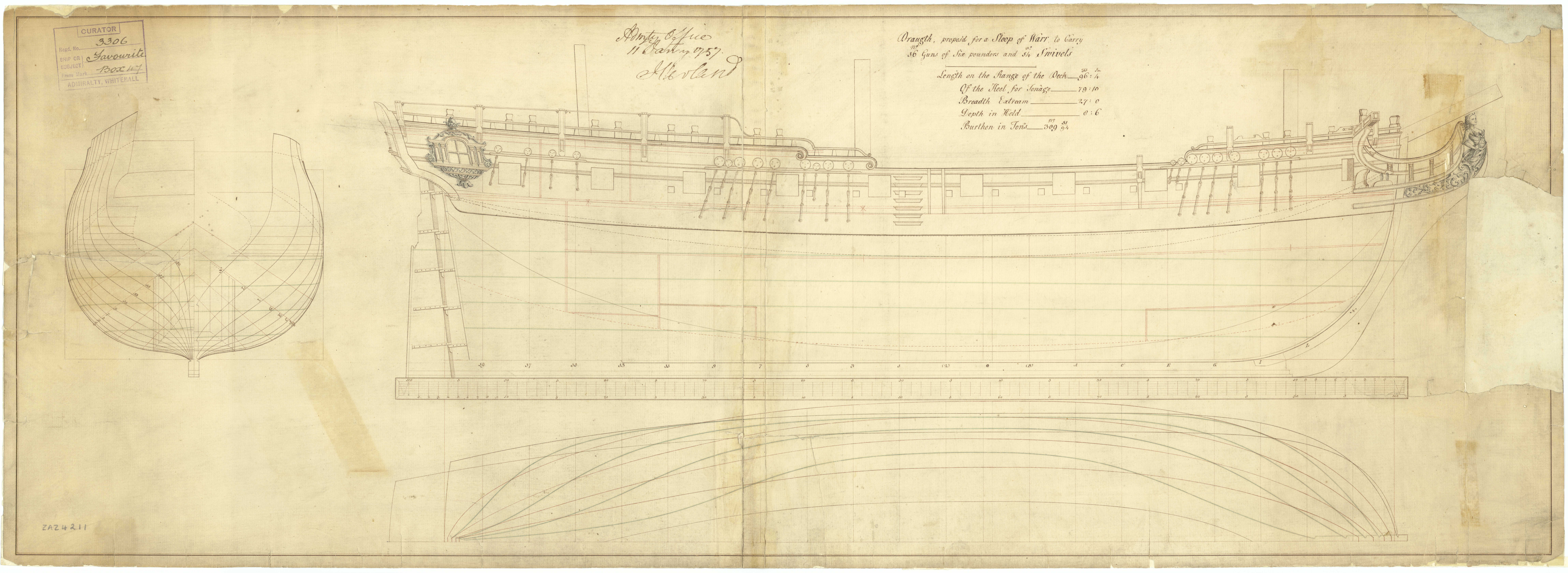
- Tamar

History

Great Britain
- Name: HMS Tamar
- Ordered: 11 January 1757
- Builder: John Snooks, Saltash
- Laid down: 15 March 1757
- Launched: 23 January 1758
- Commissioned: January 1758
- In service: 1758–1780
- Renamed: HMS Pluto in 1780
- Honours and awards: Battle of Ushant (1778)
- Captured: 30 November 1780
- Fate: Captured at sea by 24-gun French privateer Duc de Chartres

General characteristics
- Class & type: 16-gun Favourite-class sloop-of-war
- Tons burthen: 313 15/94 (bm)
- Length: 96 ft 4 in (29.4 m) (gundeck); 78 ft 10 in (24.0 m) (keel)
- Beam: 27 ft 4 in (8.3 m)
- Depth of hold: 8 ft 3 1/2 in (2.5 m)
- Propulsion: Sail
- Sail plan: Ship rig
- Complement: 125
- Armament: 16 × 6-pounder guns; 14 × ½-pounder swivel guns

This plan specifically illustrates the jury rudder made on the return voyage to Britain after she lost her rudder through electrolysis between the copper sheathing and the iron rudder pintles

HMS Tamar or Tamer was a 16-gun Favourite-class sloop-of-war of the Royal Navy.

The ship was launched in Saltash in 1758 and stationed in Newfoundland from 1763 to 1777.

From 21 June 1764 to mid-1766, under Commander Patrick Mouat, she accompanied the Dolphin on a circumnavigation of the globe during which the latter's commander, Capt. Byron, took possession of and named the Falkland Islands in January 1765.

Rear Admiral Montagu writing from Boston reported promoting Lieutenant John Crosse [Cross] to command HMS Tamar following the death of Captain Charles Hay, March 17, 1773 after two months lingering illness. Lieutenant Peyton reported from North Carolina Captain Cross had died from fever at Cape Lookout, 10 August 1773. He was succeeded by Lieutenant James Montagu.

Her Captain on 1 January 1775 is listed as Cpt. Edward Thornborough, with ship's name spelled Tamer.

Converted into a fire ship and renamed Pluto in 1777

The warship hosted South Carolina's royal governor, Lord William Campbell, beginning in September 1775, when increasingly-violent patriot activity drove the governor from his home on the mainland. She was renamed HMS Pluto when she was converted into a fire ship in 1777. The French privateer Duc de Chartres captured her on 30 November 1780. Her subsequent fate is unknown.
