= Green Patch =

Human settlement in the Falkland Islands

Coordinates: 51.5303°S 58.1287°W

Green Patch is a settlement on East Falkland, in the Falkland Islands, It is on the north east coast, on the south shore of Berkeley Sound, a few miles south east from Port Louis, on Port Louis Harbour. It looks out onto Long Island and Hog Island.

It was the location of an experiment to try to remedy the land ownership imbalance in the islands:

In an effort to alleviate this problem of dependence [outlined in the Shackleton report], and notably to offer opportunity to those requiring their own stake in the economy by obtaining land, the Falkland Islands Company sold their Green Patch holding of 72,000 acres (290 km^{2}), situated north of Stanley. This was acquired by the Falkland Islands Government, subdivided into six separate holdings and in 1980 was leased to applicants, with an option to apply for freehold possession after twenty years.
