= Volunteer Point =

Headland in the Falkland Islands

Coordinates: 51°28′16″S 57°50′42″W

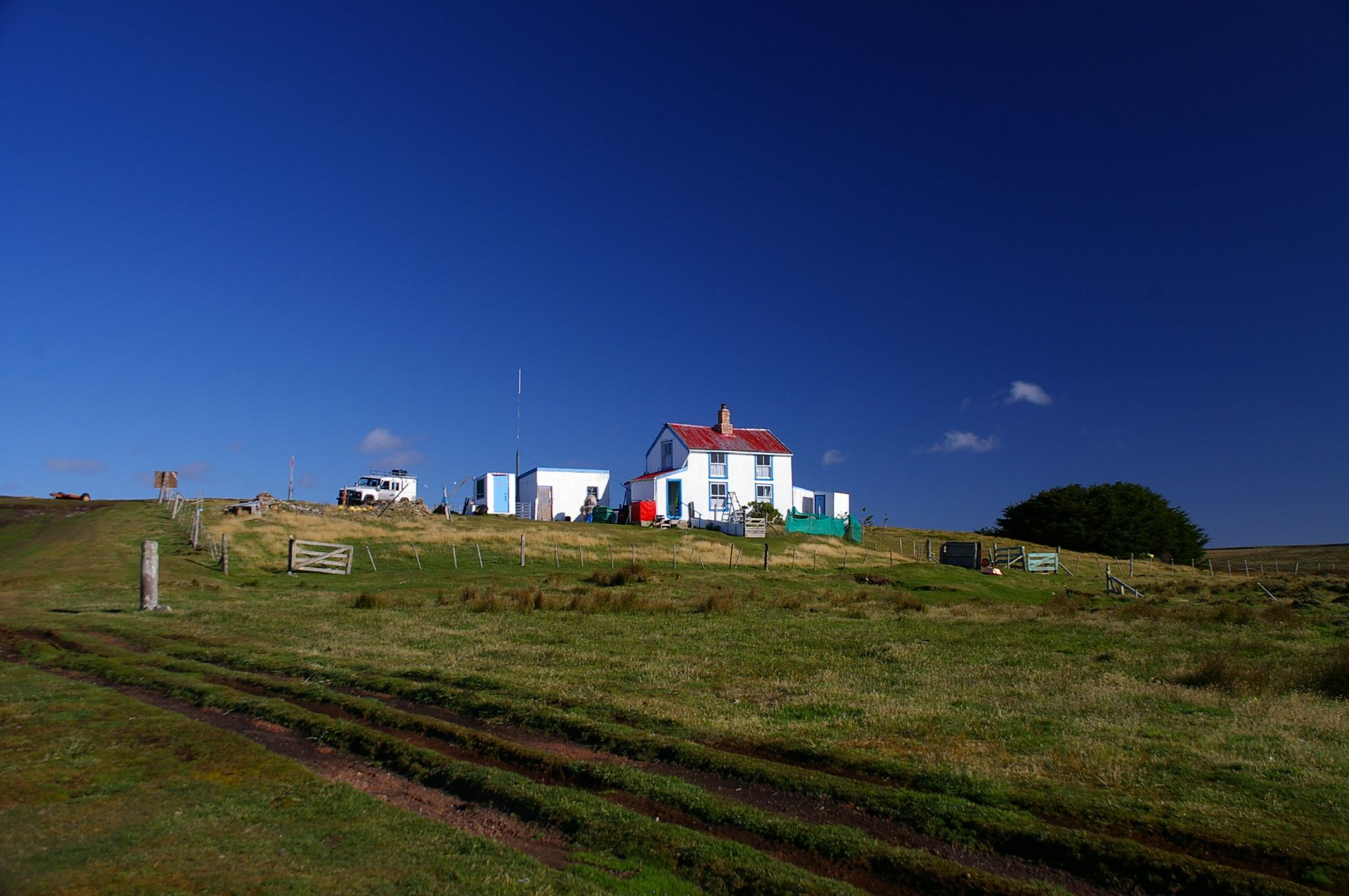
Volunteer Shanty

Volunteer Point is a headland on the east coast of East Falkland, in the Falkland Islands, north-northeast of Stanley, and east of Johnson's Harbour and Berkeley Sound. It lies at the end of a narrow peninsula, which protects Volunteer Lagoon. It is named after the ship Volunteer, which visited the islands in 1815. Volunteer Point hosts the islands' largest king penguin colony along its beach.

== History and status ==
Volunteer Point is one of the easternmost points of the islands, but Cape Pembroke is the furthest east. It received its name in 1815, after the ship Volunteer visited the Falkland Islands. During the Falklands War, Argentine commanders considered it a potential British landing point because it was far from continental Argentine airbases (e.g. Rio Grande, Comodoro Rivadavia), and those at Pebble Island and as a strategic foothold for any British force wishing to retake Stanley. However, in the event, the British landings took place on San Carlos Water in the west of East Falkland, on Falkland Sound.

Volunteer Point was designated a National Nature Reserve in 1968 and is classified as an Important Bird Area (IBA FK21) by BirdLife International. The area lies within Johnson's Harbour Farm, which is privately owned and locally managed. The landscape is characterized by a 3.2 kilometers (2.0 mi) white sand beach known as Volunteer Beach, bordered by grassy banks and rolling terrain. The headland features hard quartz-sandstone formations, among the oldest sedimentary rocks in the Falkland Islands.

== Wildlife ==
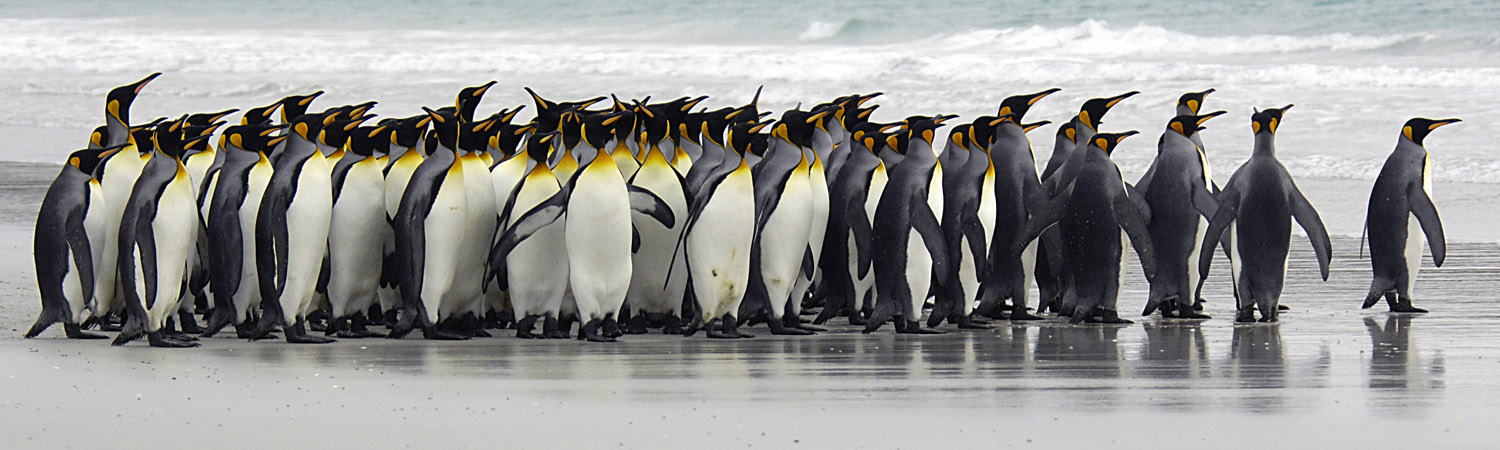
King penguins congregating on the beach at Volunteer Point

Volunteer Point hosts the islands' largest king penguin colony along its beach. Birds for which the site is of conservation significance include Falkland steamer ducks (75 breeding pairs), ruddy-headed geese (100 pairs), gentoo penguins (3600 pairs as of March 2014), Magellanic penguins (estimated to be 2500 pairs as of March 2014) and white-bridled finches.

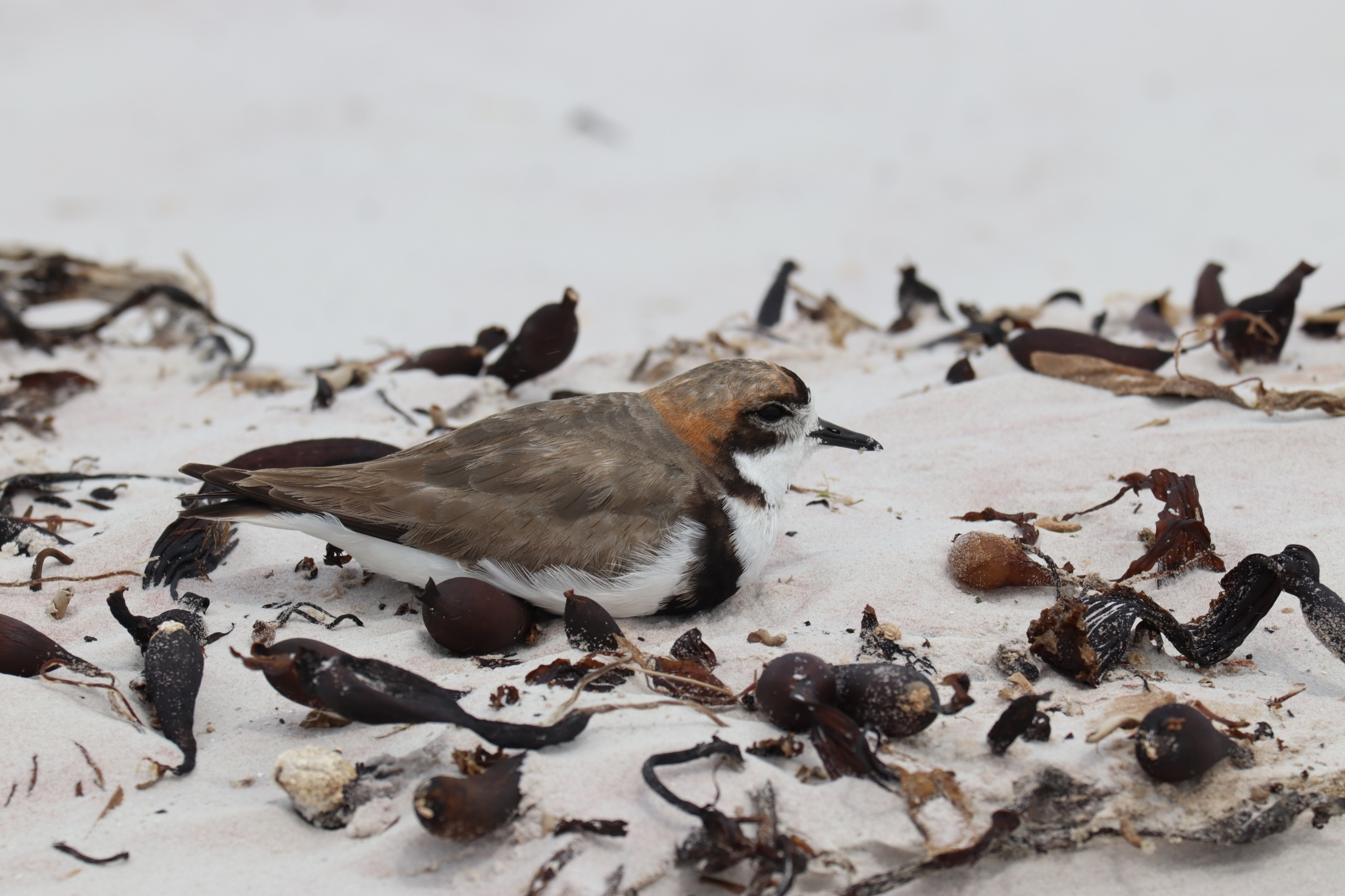
Two-banded plover (Charadrius falklandicus) at Volunteer Point.

More than 40 other bird species have been recorded in the area, such as the South American tern, rock shag, kelp gull, dolphin gull, and various oystercatcher and goose species. Southern sea lions are also frequently observed and are known to prey on penguins. Predatory birds including skuas and southern giant petrels have been documented taking eggs and chicks.

== Tourism ==
Volunteer Point is a popular ecotourism destination, accessible via an overland vehicle journey of approximately three hours from Stanley or by helicopter. Access generally requires the landowner's permission, and is usually permitted when conditions are dry. Accommodation is available at the site in the warden's house.

A study conducted during the 2001–2002 tourist season recorded 1,072 visitors between November and March. Overseas tourists accounted for 57% of visits, local residents 24%, and British military personnel 19%. Peak visitation occurred in December and January. Most visitors spend time at the king penguin colony, averaging 63 minutes per visit, and also explore the gentoo penguin colony and Volunteer Beach. Visitor activity is largely concentrated between 11:00 and 15:00, which may allow resident penguins to habituate to human presence.
