= Gilbert House (Falkland Islands) =

Building in Stanley, Falkland Islands

Coordinates: 51°41′28″S 57°51′57″W

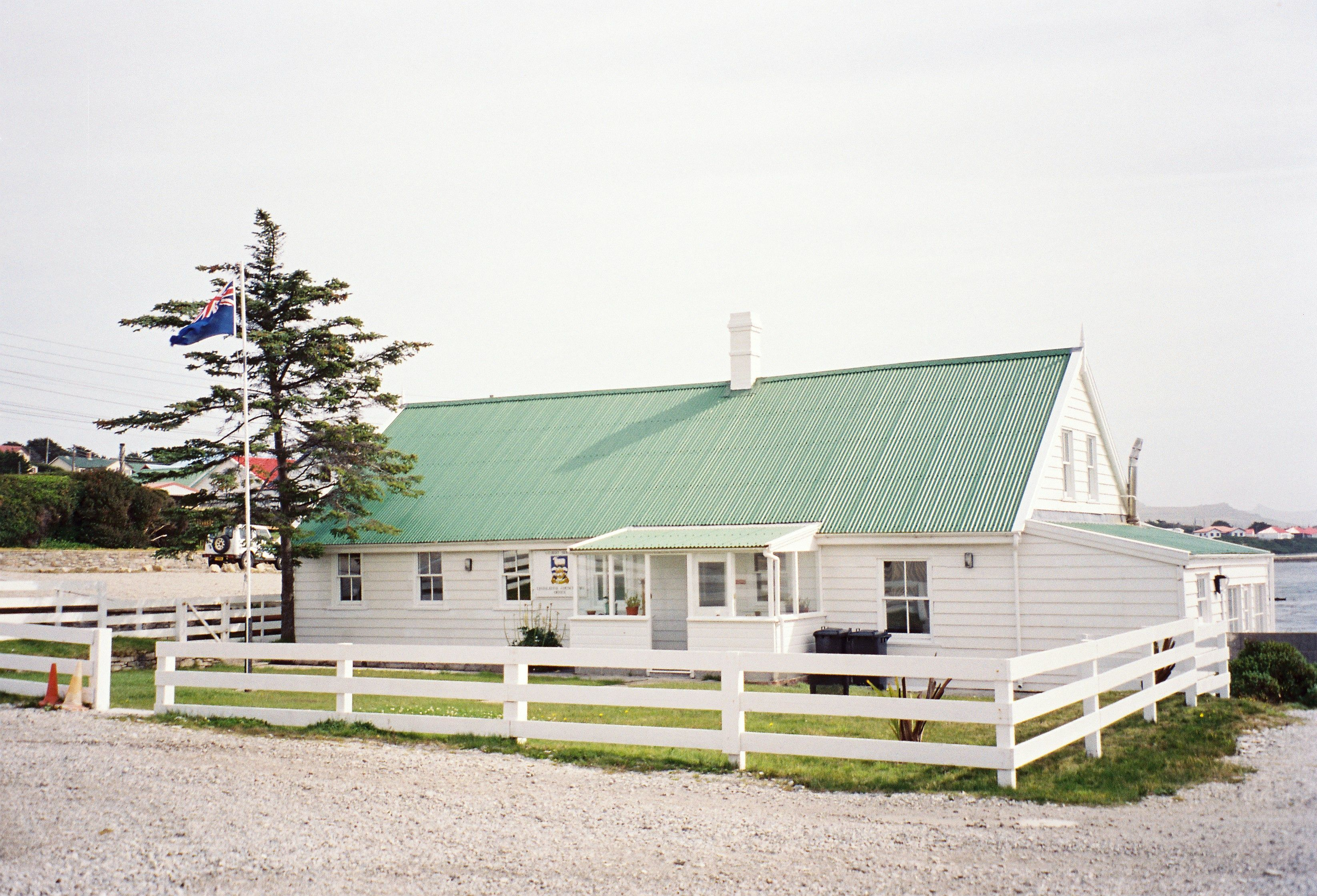
View of Gilbert House from the north-east

Gilbert House is the building in Stanley, Falkland Islands, where the Legislative Assembly of the Falkland Islands meets. It is located in Ross Road across the street from the Malvina House Hotel. Each member of the Legislative Assembly has an office in Gilbert House.

Gilbert House is a listed building.
