= Listed buildings in the Falkland Islands =

This is a list of buildings and structures in the Falkland Islands designated as being of architectural or historic interest, updated per 19 January 2006.

Building	Location / Address	Owner
The Old House	Long Island	
The Galpon	Darwin	
Stone Corral	Darwin	
The Stone Cottage	Goose Green	
Goose Green Hall	Goose Green	Falklands Landholdings
Paragon House	Lafonia	
Mount Rosalie Dip	Port Howard	
Old House	Shallow Bay	
Stone Corral	Spring Point	
Cape Meredith Shanty Mission Buildings	Keppel Island	
The Stone Cottage	Saunders Island	
House & Woolshed	Barren Island	
Boathouse, Store & Shed	Carcass Island	
Cape Pembroke Lighthouse	Cape Pembroke	Falkland Islands Government
Camber House	Stanley Harbour	Falkland Islands Government
Camber Pump House	Stanley Harbour	Falkland Islands Government
Government House	Stanley	Falkland Islands Government
Cable Cottage	Cable Street, Stanley	Falkland Islands Government
Cemetery Cottage	Snake Hill, Stanley	Falkland Islands Government
Gilbert House (home to Legislative Assembly of the Falkland Islands)	Ross Road, Stanley	Falkland Islands Government
Lois Cottage	John Street, Stanley	Falkland Islands Government
Old repeater (RT) Station	St. Mary's Walk, Stanley	Falkland Islands Government
Old Stables	Racecourse Road, Stanley	Falkland Islands Government
Police Station	Ross Road, Stanley	Falkland Islands Government
Police Cottages	Ross Road, Stanley	Falkland Islands Government
Powder Magazine	Stanley	Falkland Islands Government
Stanley Cottage	Ross Road, Stanley	Falkland Islands Government
Stanley House	Ross Road / John Street, Stanley	Falkland Islands Government
Sulivan House	Ross Road West, Stanley	Falkland Islands Government
Water Pump	Drury Street, Stanley	Falkland Islands Government
Water Pump	John Street, Stanley	Falkland Islands Government
Whalebone Arch	Stanley	Falkland Islands Government
Old Central Store	Dockyard, Ross Road, Stanley	Falkland Islands Government
Old Gaol	Dockyard, Ross Road, Stanley	Falkland Islands Government
Blacksmith's Shop	Dockyard, Ross Road, Stanley	Falkland Islands Government
Boat House	Dockyard, Ross Road, Stanley	Falkland Islands Government
Workshop	Dockyard, Ross Road, Stanley	Falkland Islands Government
Marmont Row	Ross Road, Stanley	Falkland Islands Company
Pigeon Loft	11 Ross Road West, Stanley	
House	4 Fitzroy Road East, Stanley	
House	21 Fitzroy Road, Stanley	
House	4 Villiers Street, Stanley	
German Camp East	Callaghan Road, Stanley	
German Camp West	Callaghan Road, Stanley	
Jubilee Villas	38–40 Ross Road, Stanley	
House	4 Drury Street, Stanley	
House	12 Drury Street, Stanley	
House	20 Drury Street, Stanley	
House	4 Pioneer Row, Stanley	
House	5 Pioneer Row, Stanley	
House	6 Pioneer Row, Stanley	
House	8 Pioneer Row, Stanley	
House	9 Pioneer Row, Stanley	
House	14 Pioneer Row, Stanley	
House	15 Pioneer Row, Stanley	
Cartmell Cottage	7 Pioneer Row, Stanley	Falkland Islands Museum and National Trust

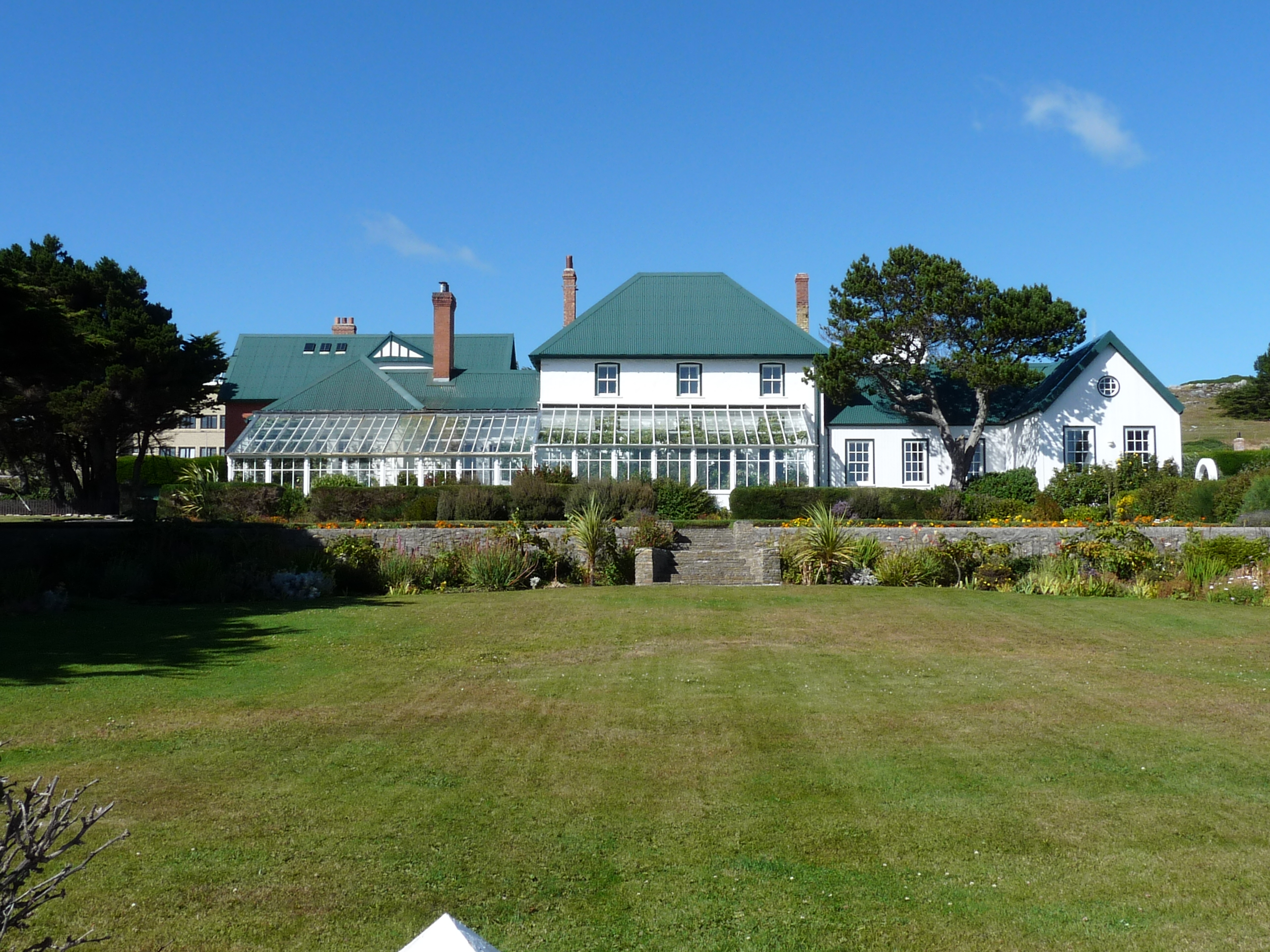
Government House, Stanley

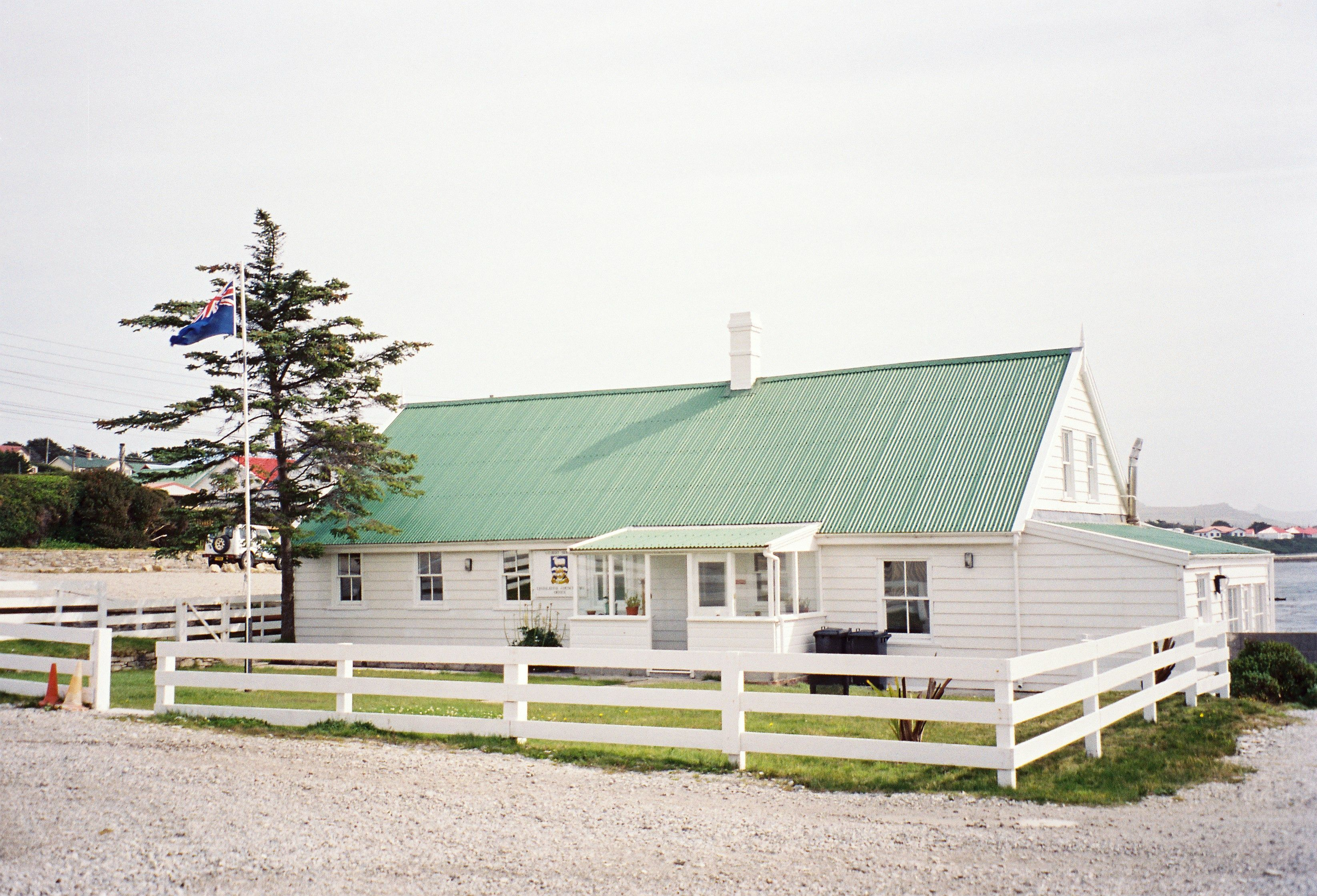
Gilbert House, Stanley

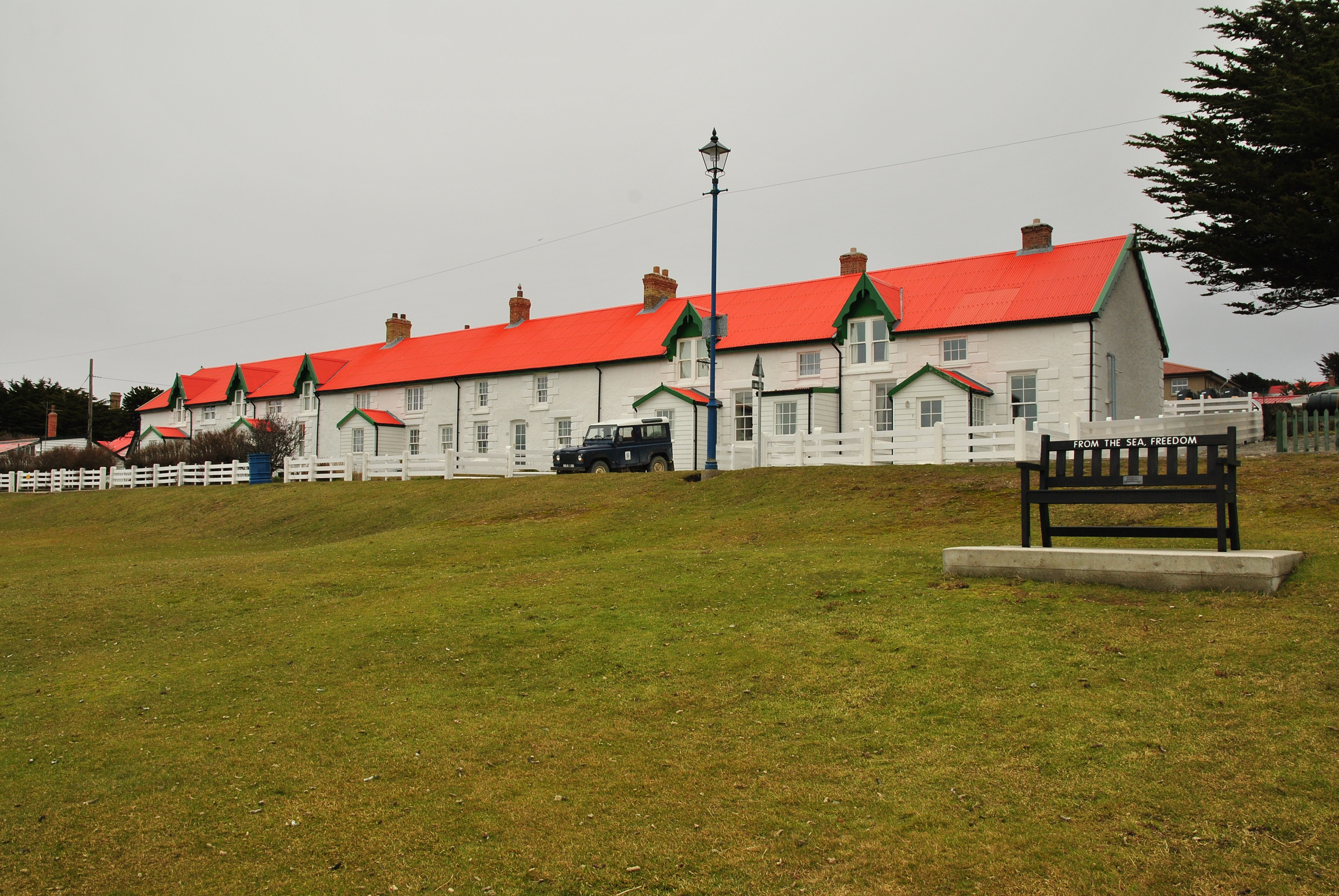
Marmont Row, Stanley

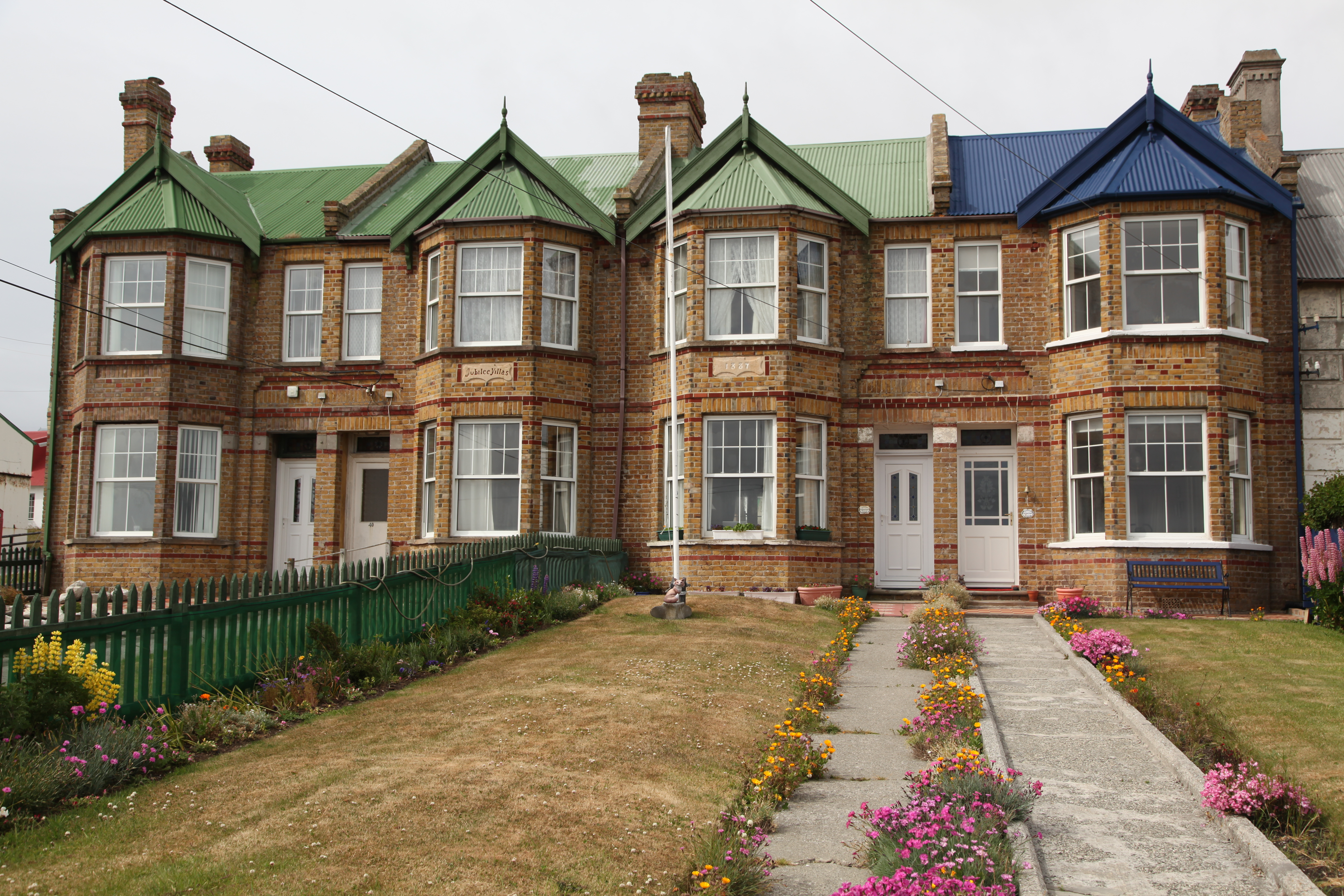
Jubilee Villas, Stanley

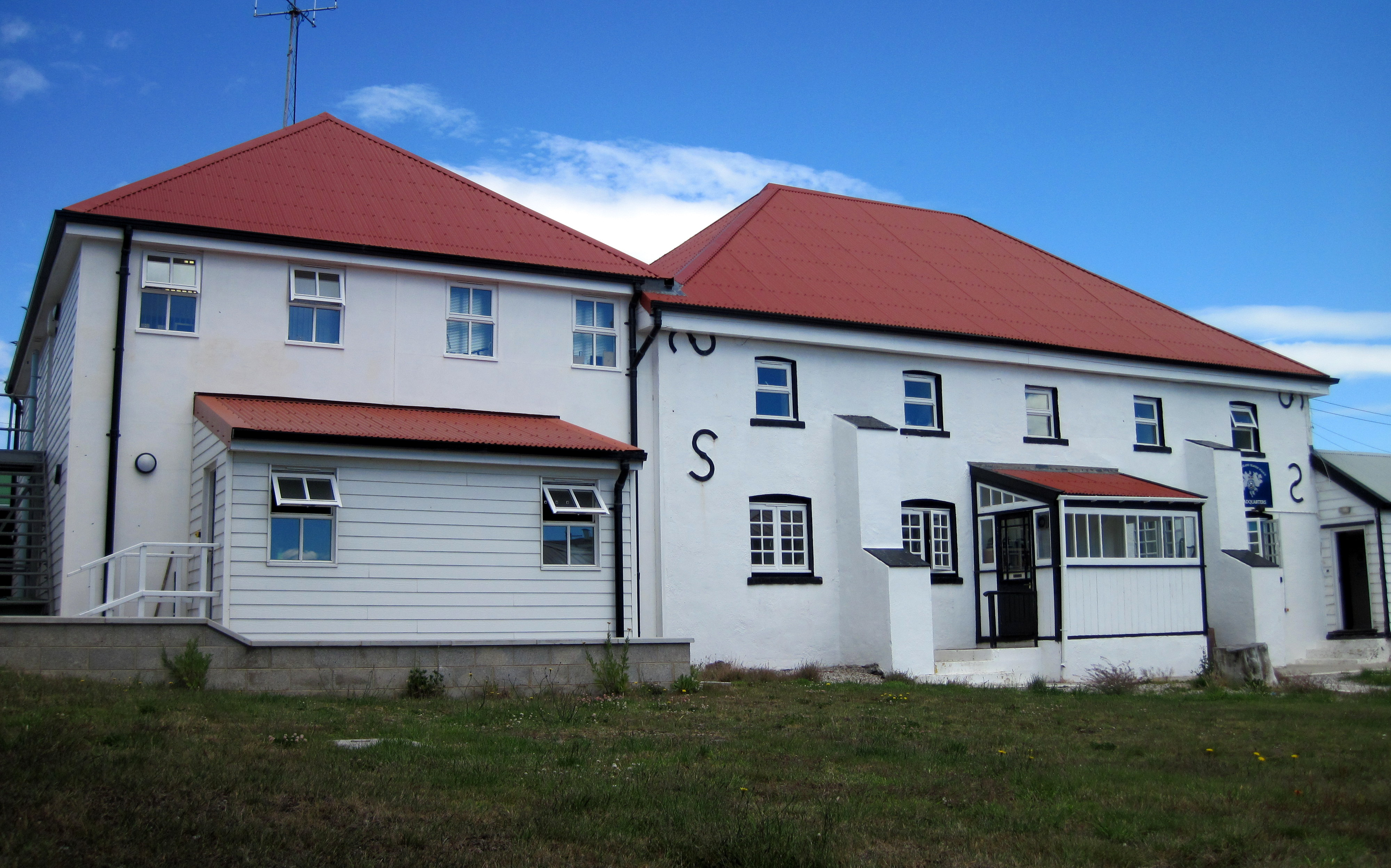
Police station, Stanley

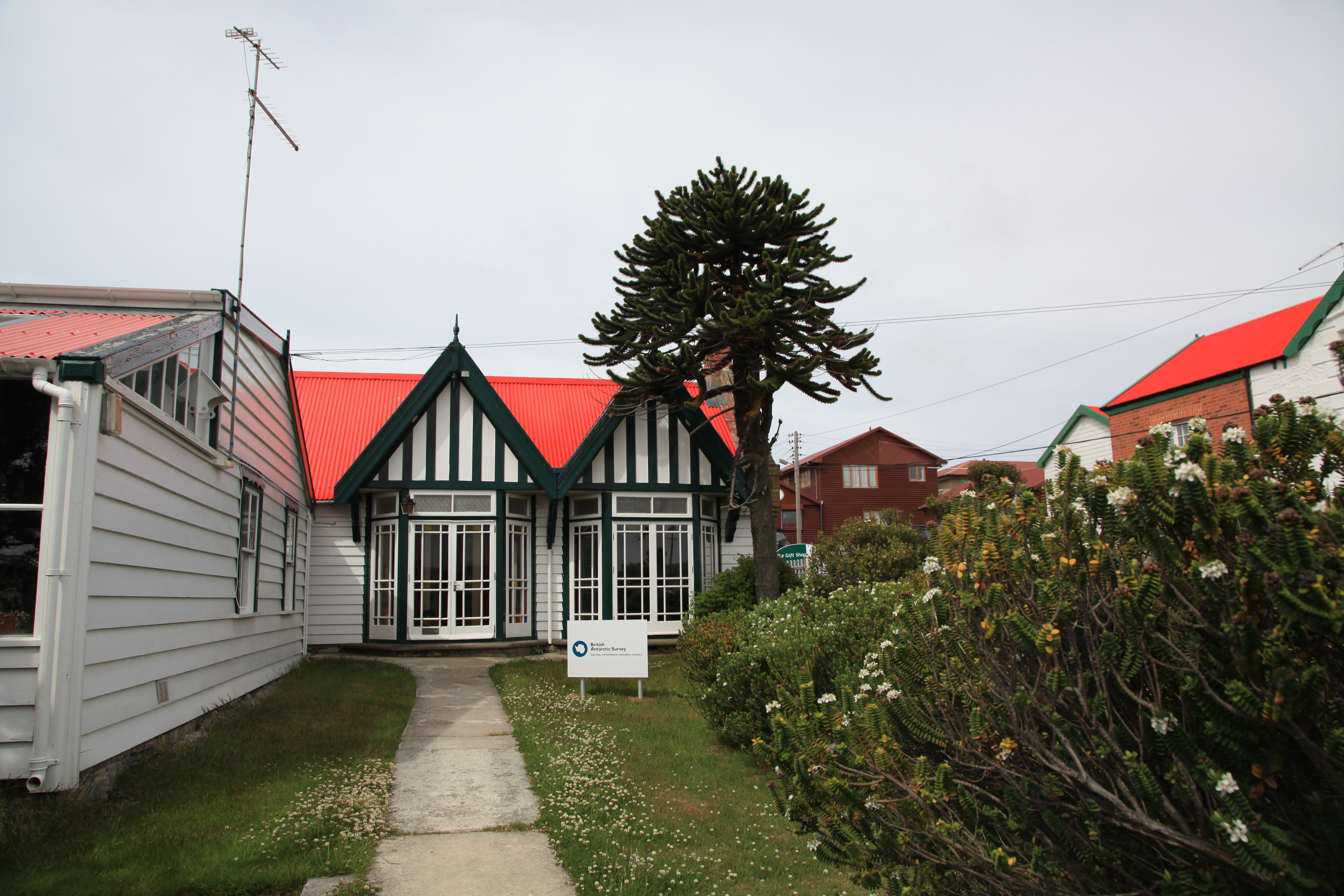
Stanley Cottage, British Antarctic Survey office

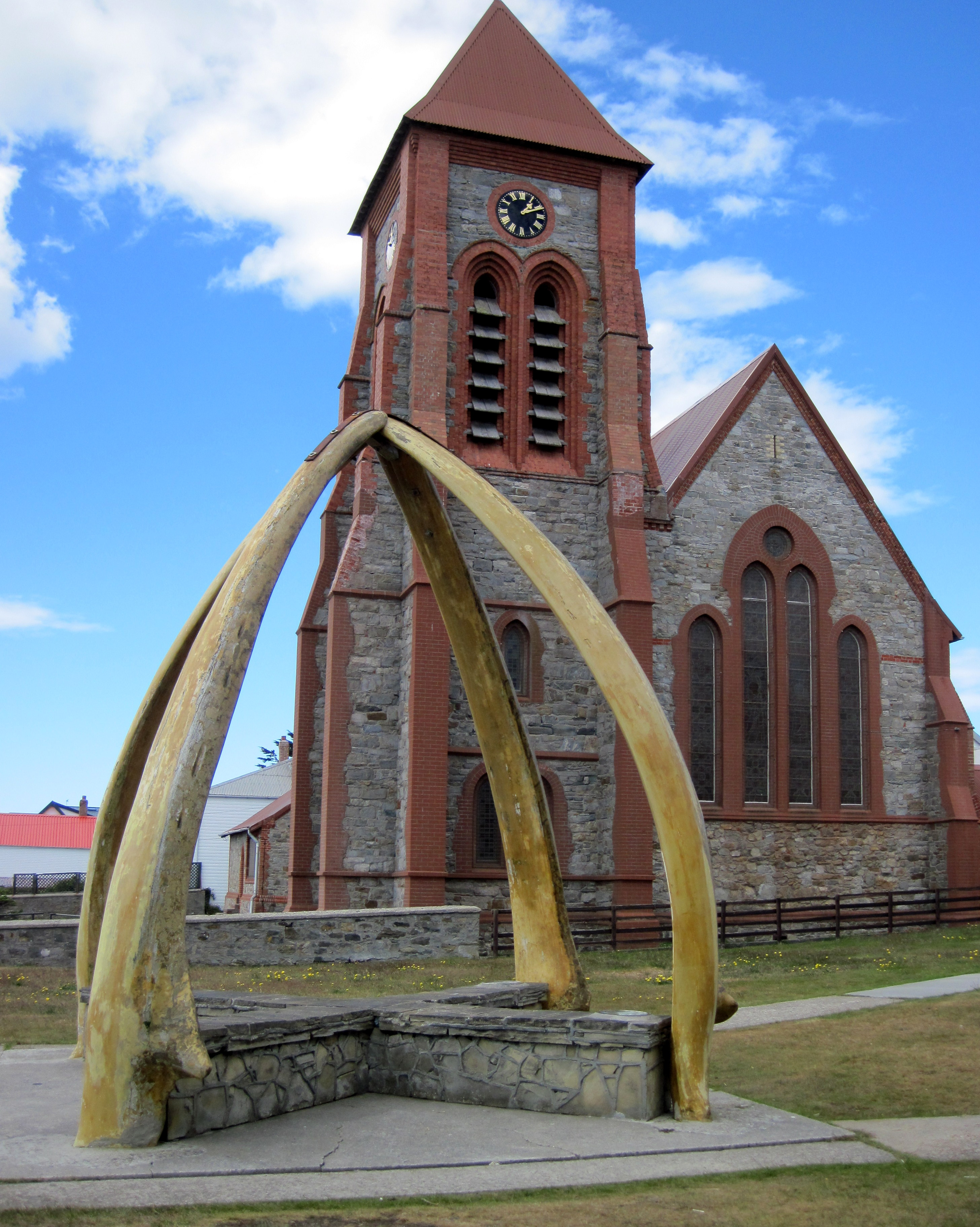
Whalebone Arch, Stanley

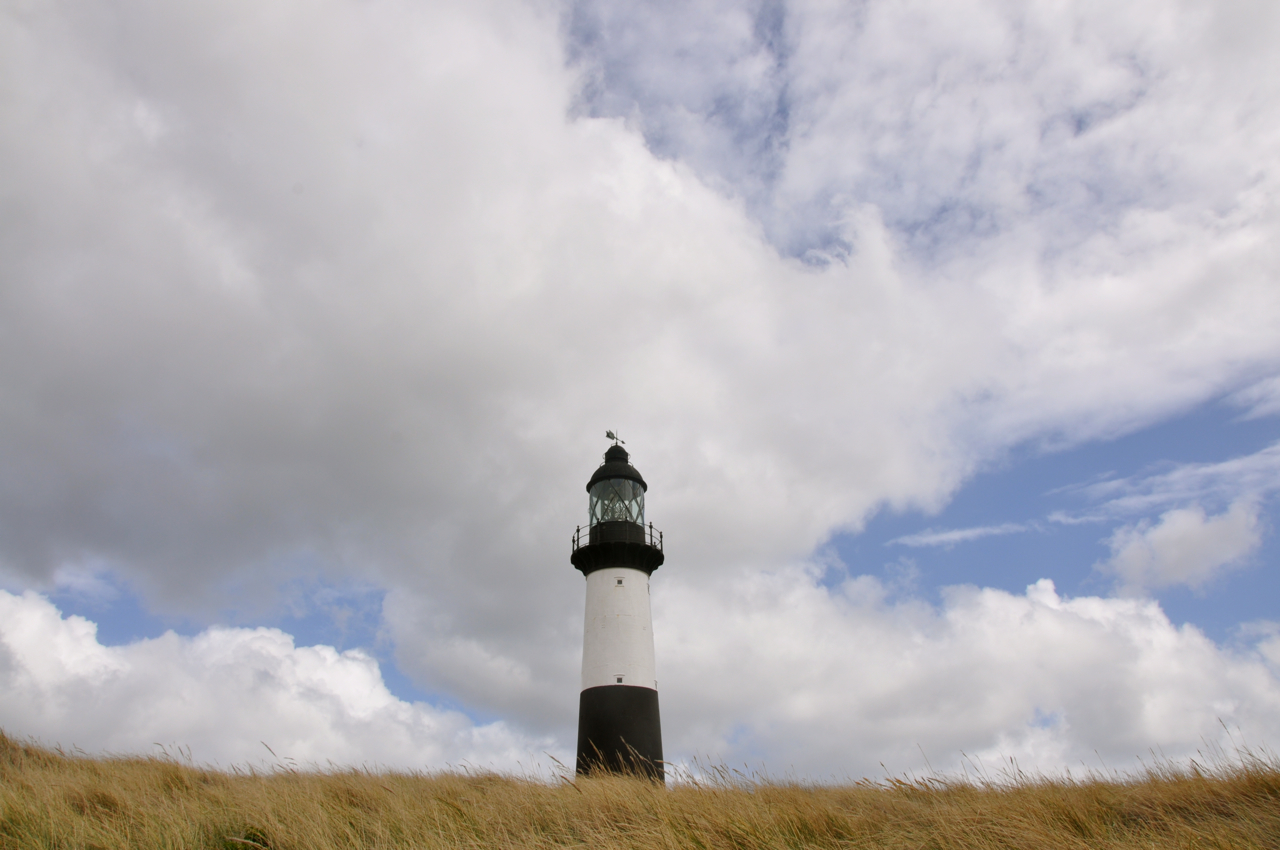
Pembroke Lighthouse
