= Uranie Bay =

Coordinates: 51°35′S 58°03′W

- Interactive map of Uranie Bay
- Location: East Falkland, Falkland Islands
- Type: Bay
- Part of: Berkeley Sound
- Basin countries: Falkland Islands

Uranie Bay is in the north east of East Falkland on the south coast of Berkeley Sound. It is named after the corvette L’Uranie, which was beached there in February 1820 after striking a submerged rock off Volunteer Point.

== Name ==
The vessel was returning to France after almost achieving a full circumnavigation of the globe (which would have been completed at Rio de Janeiro, one of the early ports of call). Although there was some hope at the time of beaching that the hull could be repaired, this proved impossible, and the 109 sailors and 23 officers were stranded for two and a half months. They survived by hunting the cattle and horses that had been left on the (then uninhabited) islands for just such emergencies and, when all else failed, penguins. Remarkably, the liquor store, although virtually unguarded, remained intact until their ultimate departure.

== Rescue ==
After some abortive discussions with William Orne, the captain of the American sealer General Knox, the castaways were eventually rescued by another American ship, the Mercury, which was flying the flag of the rebel colonists of Buenos Aires and carrying guns and munitions to their fellow rebels in Chile. The Mercury was first chartered and then, when at sea, purchased by the Uranie’s captain, Louis de Freycinet, who renamed her La Physicienne and sailed her back to France via Montevideo and Rio.

== Rose de Freycinet ==
A remarkable feature of the voyage, the first scientific expedition sent out from France after the Napoleonic wars, was the highly illegal presence of the captain's wife Rose de Freycinet, who had been smuggled on board in Toulon dressed a man. Her diary provides a vivid picture of her time in the castaway's camp and of the sometimes tortuous negotiations with Galvin, the captain of the Mercury. Just before leaving the Falklands, she and her husband dined on board with James Weddell, who recorded the meeting in his own diary.

== Later visit ==
In November 1822 the bay was revisited by Louis Isidore Duperrey, who had served as an ensign on L’Uranie and now had his own command, the Coquille. He found that the wreck had suffered severely at the hands of the crews of the various whalers that had visited Berkeley Sound since the departure of the Mercury, and that what remained was half covered by sand.

== Falklands War ==
The bay was one of the potential landing sites considered by British forces during the Falklands War, for the same reasons as Volunteer Point nearby. It was considered a good site for a direct assault, however it was heavily guarded by Argentine positions, unlike San Carlos Water It was also within range of the Exocet launches at Stanley and nearby it on Hooker Point.
