= List of museums in the Falkland Islands =

This is a list of museums in the Falkland Islands.

== Museums in the Falkland Islands ==
- Falkland Islands Museum
- Barnard Memorial Museum
- Historic Dockyard Museum
- Port Howard Museum
- Goose Green Museum
- Cartmell Cottage
- North Arm Settlement Museum
- Post Office Museum
- Bluff Cove Museum

== See also ==
- List of museums
