= Cape Pembroke =

Easternmost point of the Falkland Islands

Cape Pembroke (Spanish: Cabo San Felipe) is the easternmost point of the Falkland Islands, and is on East Falkland. There is an automated lighthouse here.

== Lighthouse ==
Cape Pembroke Lighthouse
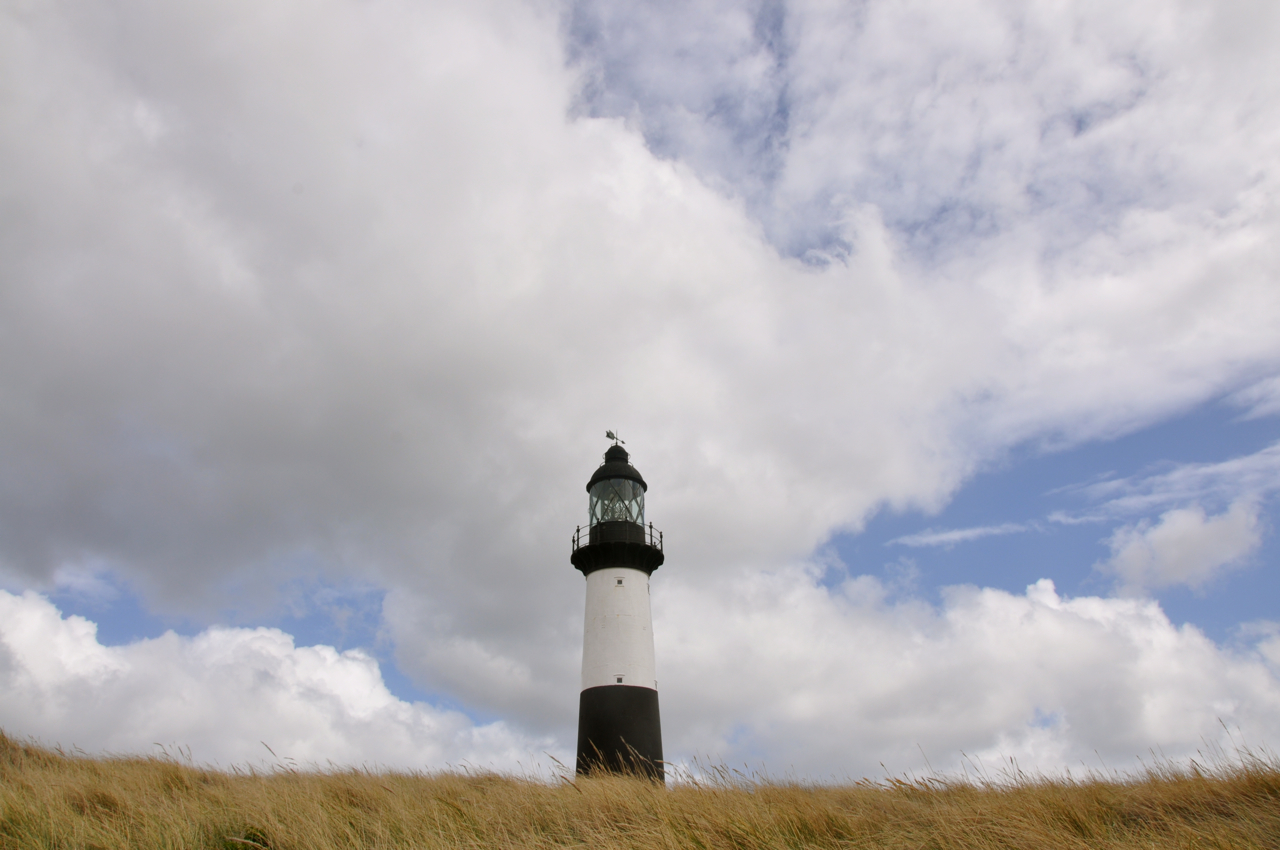
- Location: Cape Pembroke, Falkland Islands, United Kingdom
- Coordinates: 51°41′S 57°43′W

Tower
- Constructed: 1855 (first)
- Construction: cast iron tower
- Height: 18 metres (59 ft) (first)
- Shape: cylindrical tower with balcony and lantern
- Markings: black tower with a horizontal white band, black lantern
- Operator: Falkland Islands Museum and National Trust

Light
- First lit: 1987 (current)
- Deactivated: 1982 (first)
- Focal height: 30 metres (98 ft) (current)
- Lens: 3rd order Fresnel lens
- Range: 10 nautical miles (19 km; 12 mi)
- Characteristic: Fl(3) W 20s

An automated 18 metres (59 ft) lighthouse on Cape Pembroke was built in 1855, and rebuilt in 1906, and was restored in the 1990s. Previously, the nearby Billy Rock offshore had claimed fifteen ships, and there were unlit markers here.

The original light used rape seed oil, but as it burnt a thousand gallons a year, sea lion oil was attempted as a substitute. When it was rebuilt in 1906, it was converted to paraffin and worked by clockwork. After World War II a less romantic structure was built to the east.

A small lighthouse keepers cottage used to stand here. The lighthouse itself is now a listed building.

== Farm and James Smith ==
In the late nineteenth century, Cape Pembroke peninsula was a small farm, which the islands' government leased to James Smith of Stanley. There were few such small farms in the islands and James Smith was ardent in his support of agrarian reform.

== Atlantic Conveyor memorial ==
In June 2007, Prince Edward, Earl of Wessex unveiled a memorial to the SS Atlantic Conveyor, a merchant ship requisitioned by the British military during the Falklands Conflict of 1982. the ship was attacked by Argentine fighters and the resultant explosions killed 12 sailors. Whilst under tow after the event, she sunk off the north eastern coast of the Falkland Islands.

== Gallery ==
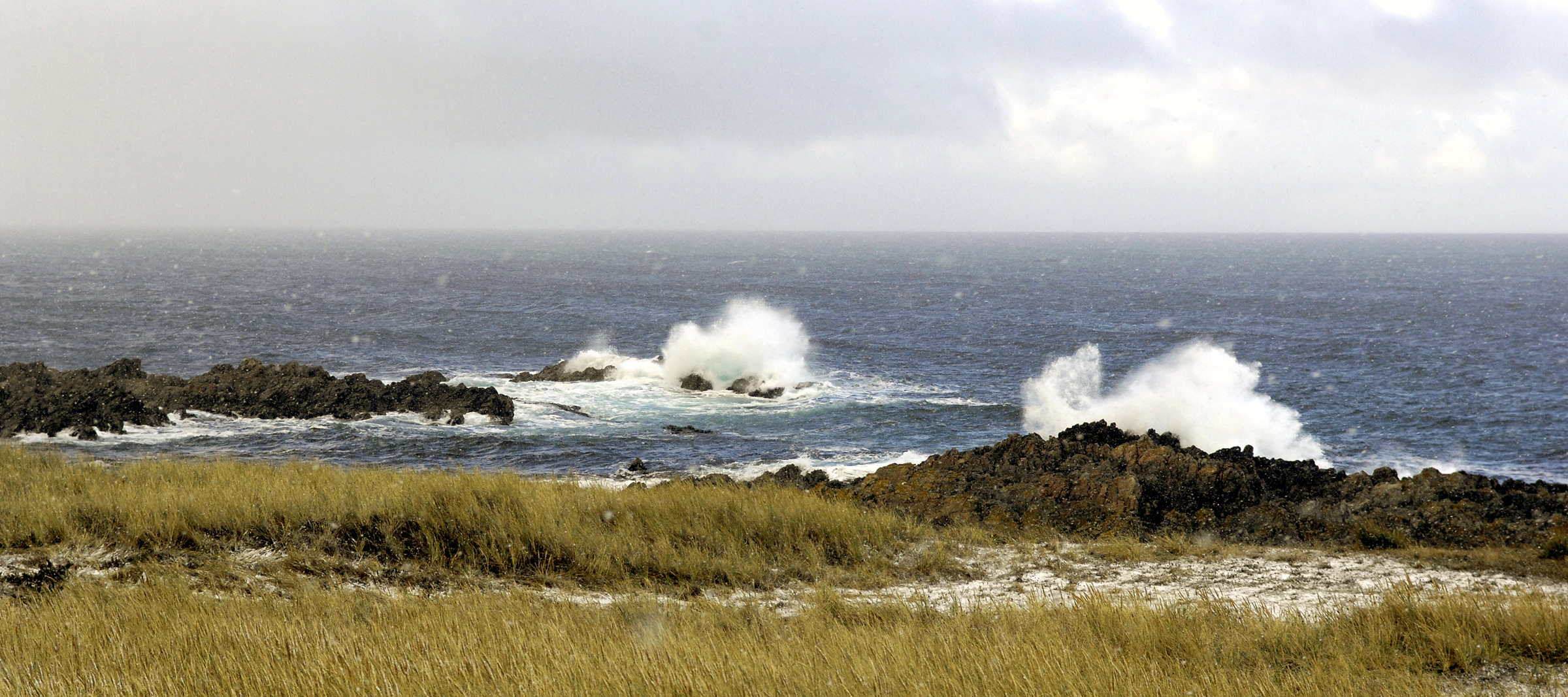
Breakers crashing over Cape Pembroke on the eastern side of East Falkland

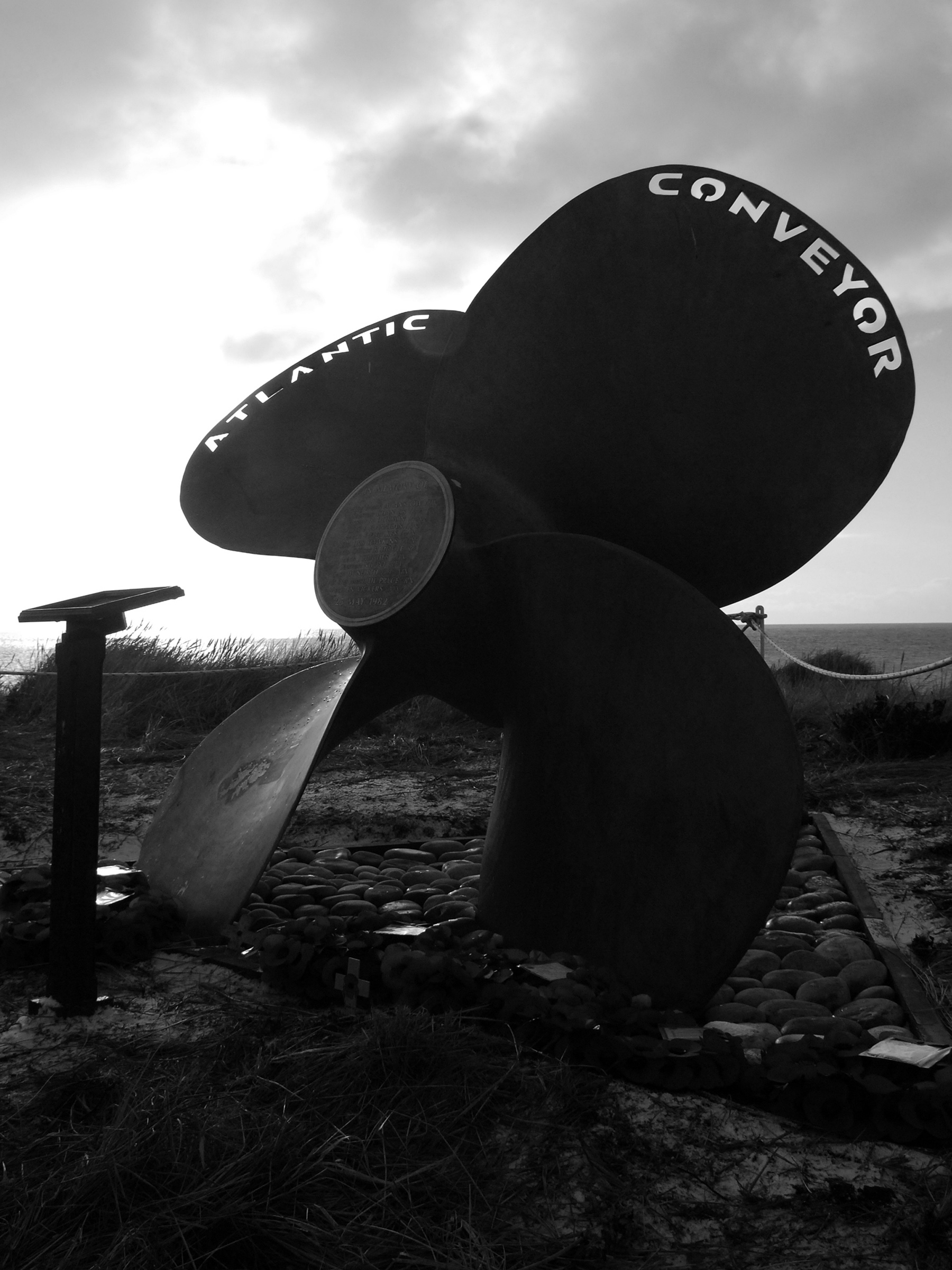
A memorial unveiled in 2007 to the SS Atlantic Conveyor at Cape Pembroke in the Falkland Islands
