= Malvina House Hotel =

Coordinates: 51.6917°S 57.8658°W

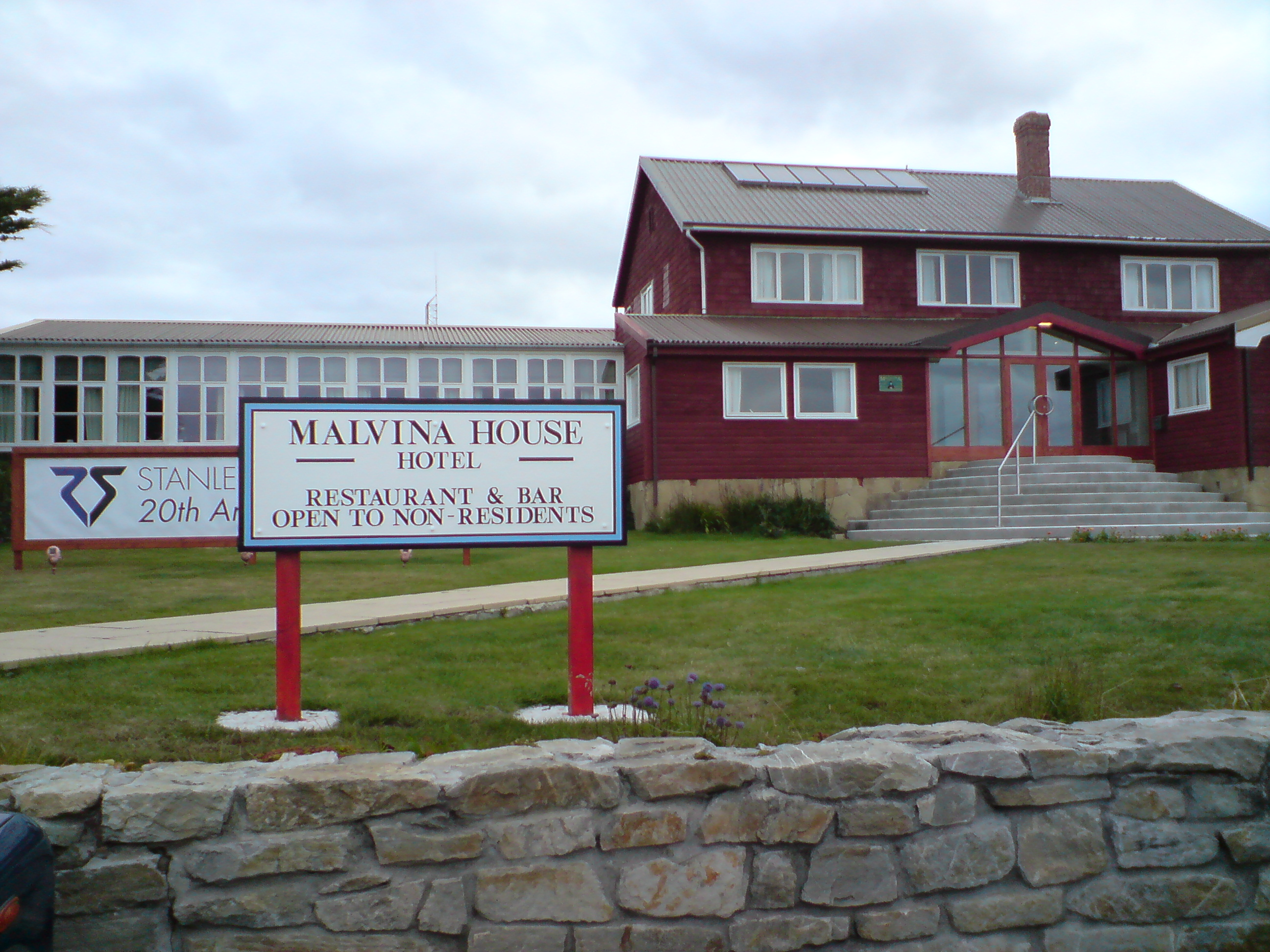
Malvina House Hotel.

The Malvina House hotel is a hotel located on Ross Road, Stanley in the Falkland Islands. It now occupies the site of a house built by John James Felton in 1880, John Felton being one of the original Chelsea Pensioners sent to the islands in 1849. He named the building Malvina House after his daughter Malvina, Malvina being an old Scottish name. The original building was demolished in the late 1960s but part of the structure remains and was incorporated into the hotel.
