= Long Island, Falkland Islands =

Long Island
- Island
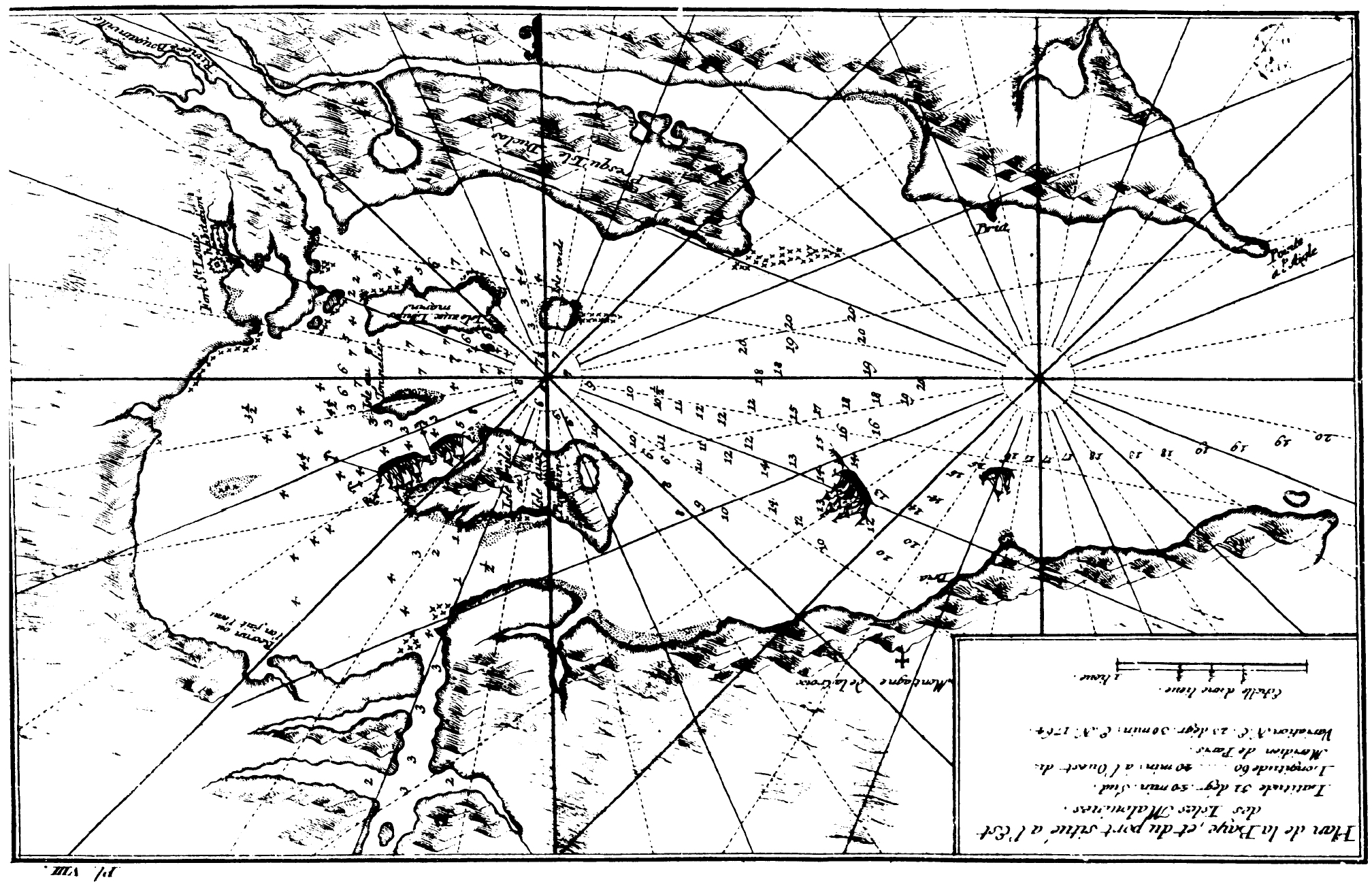
- Early mapping of Long Island (Dom Pernety, 1769)
- Coordinates: 51.55°S 58.06667°W
- Country: Falkland Islands
- Time zone: UTC−3 (FKST)
- If shown, area and population ranks are for all islands and all inhabited islands in the Falklands respectively.

Long Island (French: Isle Brûlée, Spanish: Isla Larga) is the largest island in Berkeley Sound, Falkland Islands.

During the August 1833 events in nearby Port Louis, the surviving members of Louis Vernet's settlement, seeking refuge on the nearby Hog Island to escape the murderous gang of Antonio Rivero, regularly sent their boat to Long Island for food supplies to bring cattle, pigs, and geese.

There is one listed building on the island, the Old House.
