= Berkeley Sound =

Fjord in East Falkland

- Baye Accaron (Accaron Bay); La grande baye des Iles Malouines
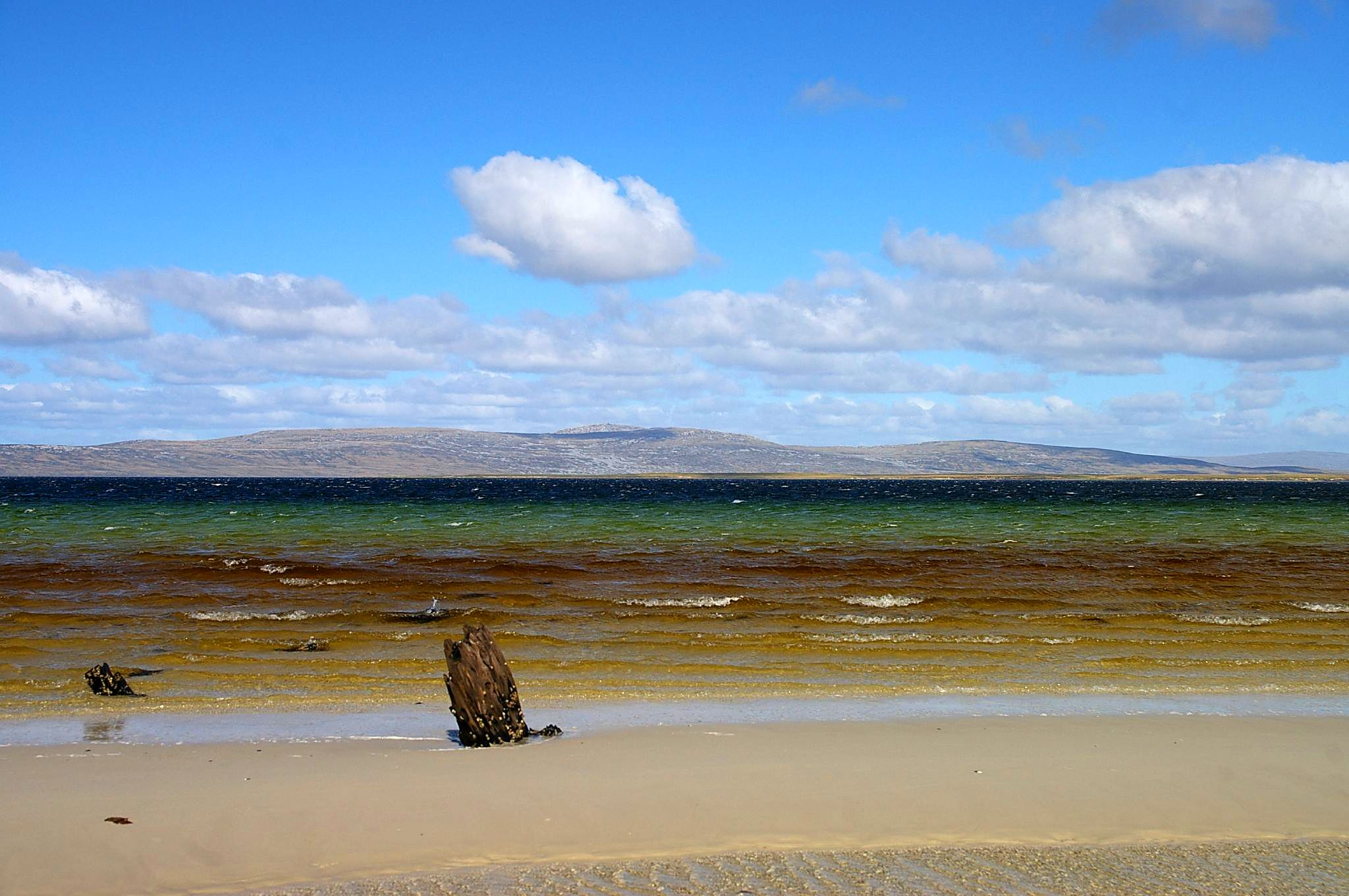
- Berkeley Sound with Wickham Heights in the background
- Interactive map of Berkeley Sound
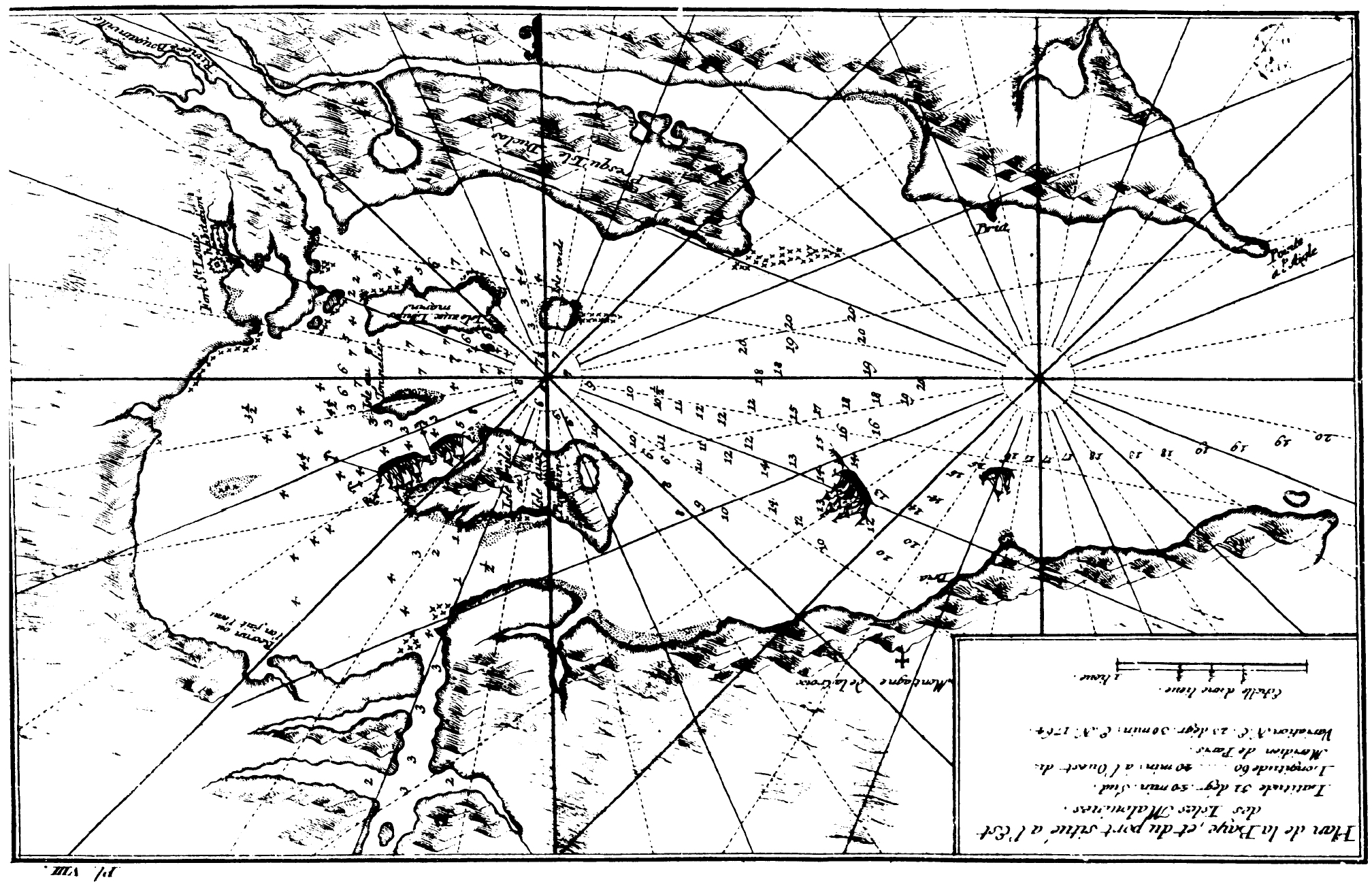
- Early mapping of Berkeley Sound (Dom Pernety, 1769)
- Location: East Falkland
- Coordinates: 51.5685°S 57.9350°W
- Ocean/sea sources: Atlantic Ocean
- Max. depth: 30 metres (98 ft)
- Islands: Hog Island; Kidney Island; Long Island

Berkeley Sound is an inlet, or fjord in the north east of East Falkland in the Falkland Islands. The sound leads directly out into the Atlantic Ocean, and has been used throughout the island's history for various countries assuming rights of ownership. The maximum depth of the sound is around 30 metres (98 ft).

== History ==
The inlet was the site of the first attempts at colonisation of the islands, at Port Louis, by the French who named it either La grande baye des Iles Malouines or Baye Accaron (Accaron Bay). The sound has also been named by the Spaniards as Puerto de la Soledad. The name La grande baye des Iles Malouines was coined by Antoine Louis de Bouganville in January 1764 who was looking to establish a new colony after being ousted from Canada. They built a settlement at the western end of the sound called Fort St Louis. Now known as Port Louis, the settlement lies at the head (western end) of Berkeley Sound.

Berkeley Sound has several smaller bays within it – Uranie Bay, Port Louis harbour and Johnson's Harbour bay, separated by Grave Point, and includes islands such as Hog Island, Kidney Island (a nature reserve) and Long Island. It was enlarged as the result of glacial action. Uranie Bay is so named after the Uranie, a vessel which struck a rock off Volunteer Point and sunk the bay. The sound itself was given its Anglicized name John Byron in January 1765, when he sailed into it.

..a very deep sound, which I called Berkeley's [sic] Sound, there is an opening which has the appearance of a harbour.

Another ship, the Lady Elizabeth also struck the same rock (known as Uranie Rock), but managed to get into the harbour at Port Stanley where her wreck still lies today. In 1823, an Argentine governor allowed Louis Vernet the rights to farm and fish a large area of East Falkland, but he seized three United States sealing ships which led to the USS Lexington entering Berkeley Sound and attacking the settlement of Port Louis. The settlement was destroyed and some of the settlers were taken prisoner.

In January 1833, HMS Clio, captained by John Onslow, arrived in the Sound and three boats went ashore to inform the people there that the islands would be reclaimed for the British. Onslow refused to let Colonel Pinedo take orders from the Argentine Republic, and those who would not settle for British rule, were put to sail two days later. Berkeley Sound was visited by Charles Darwin during his round-the-world voyage on HMS Beagle in 1834. He found it an "undulating land, with a desolate and wretched aspect". In the early 1840s, under the authority of the English governor Lieutenant Moody, the capital was moved from Port Louis to Port Stanley (at that time called Port Jackson), which Captain Mackinnon describes as "a more convenient spot for which passing ships might call when in need of repair or victualling."

Berkeley Sound is used by the fishing industry as a designated locality for the transshipment of fish, with accidental oil spills having occurred in the process. Its maximum depth is registered as being 30 metres (98 ft) in the middle of the sound and towards the mouth of the sound, where it drops away to 50 metres (160 ft).

== Wildlife ==
The sound is home to southern rockhopper penguins, sei whales, southern right whales, peale's dolphins and commerson's dolphins. Sooty shearwaters, great shearwaters and white-chinned petrels all nest on Kidney Island.

== Settlements and islands ==
Settlements

- Green Patch
- Johnson's Harbour
- Port Louis
- Port Louis South

Islands

- Celery Island
- Cochon Island
- Hog Island
- Kidney Island
- Long Island
- Turf Island
