= Hog Island, Falkland Islands =

Hog Island
- Island
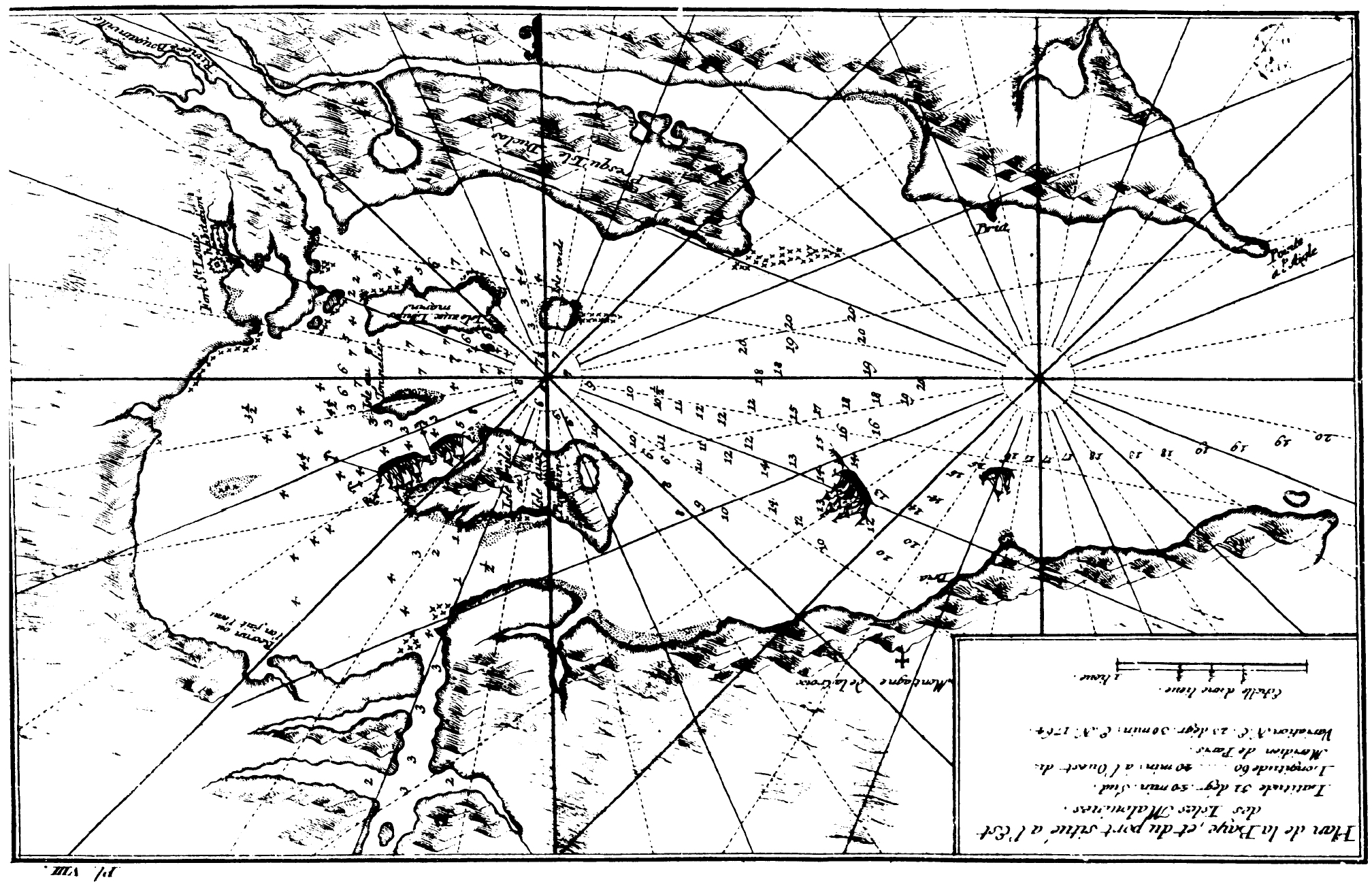
- Early mapping of Berkeley Sound (Dom Pernety, 1769)
- Coordinates: 51.540°S 58.087°W
- Country: Falkland Islands
- Time zone: UTC−3 (FKST)
- If shown, area and population ranks are for all islands and all inhabited islands in the Falklands respectively.

Hog Island is the second largest island in Berkeley Sound, Falkland Islands.

During the August 1833 events in nearby Port Louis, the surviving members of Luis Vernet's colony sought refuge on the nearby Hog Island to escape the murderous gang of Antonio Rivero, and they regularly sent their boat to neighbouring Long Island for food supplies to bring cattle, pigs, and geese.
