= Johnson's Harbour =

Human settlement on the Falkland Islands

Coordinates: 51.4990°S 58.0393°W

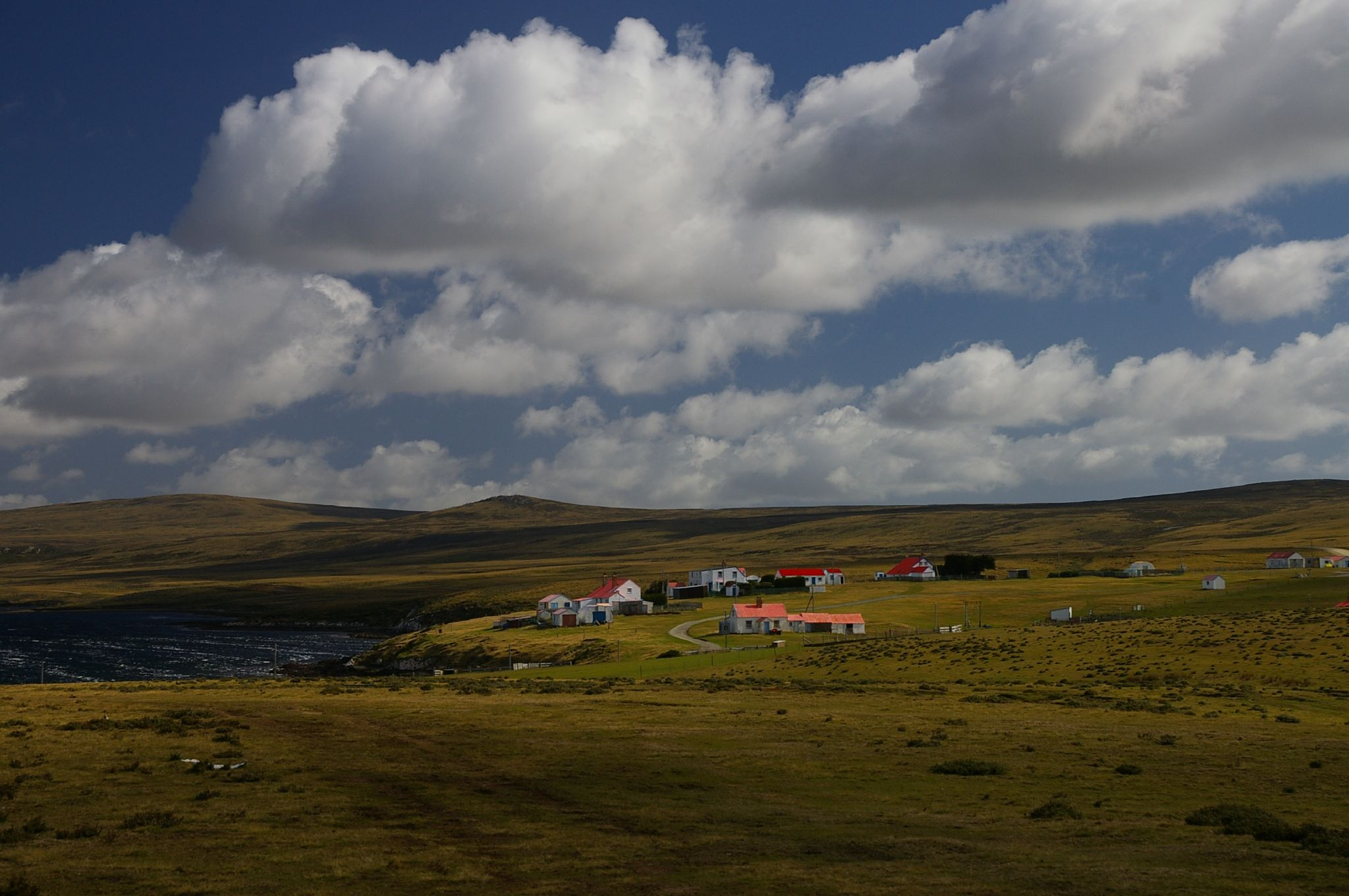
Johnson's Harbour settlement.

Johnson's Harbour is a settlement on the northeast coast of East Falkland in the Falkland Islands. It is on the shore of Berkeley Sound at the head of Chabot Creek on a bay also named Johnson's Harbour. It has a small store but the FIGAS only lands there in case of emergencies. Surrounding hills include North Lookout (191 metres (628 ft)), Diamond Mountain and Hawk Hill.

== History ==
While conducting a geographic survey of the area in November 1836, Admiral George Grey recorded:

We anchored a little after sunset off a creek called 'Johnson's Harbour'. The day having been cloudy with occasional showers, these islands at all times dreary enough, looked particularly so on our first view of them, the shores of sound, steep, with bare hills intersected with ravines rising from them, these hills without a tree and the clouds hanging low, gave them exactly the appearance of the Cheviots or a Scotch moor on a winter's day and considering we were in the May of these latitudes, the first impression of the climate was not favourable, the weather however, was not called, the thermometer was 63 degrees which is Howick mid-summer temperature.
