= Falkland Islands Museum and National Trust =

Historic dockyard of Stanley, Falkland Islands

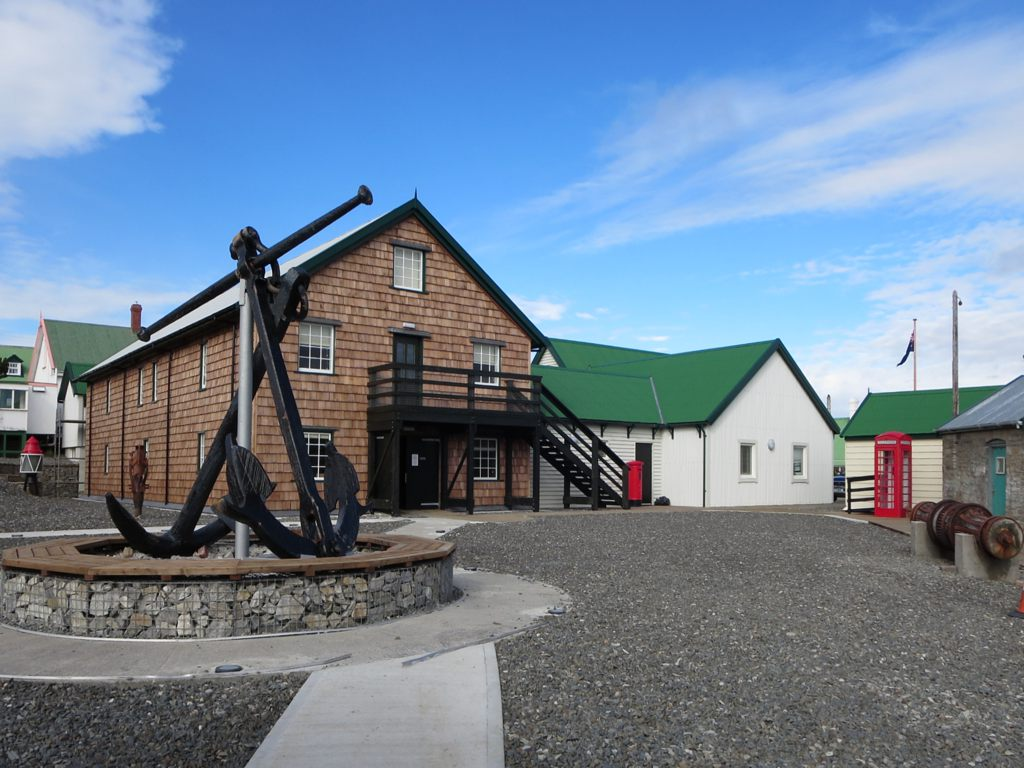
- The location of the Falkland Islands Museum since 2014
- Location: Stanley, Falkland Islands
- Coordinates: 51°41′28″S 57°51′54″W
- Owners: Falkland Islands Museum and National Trust (FIMNT)

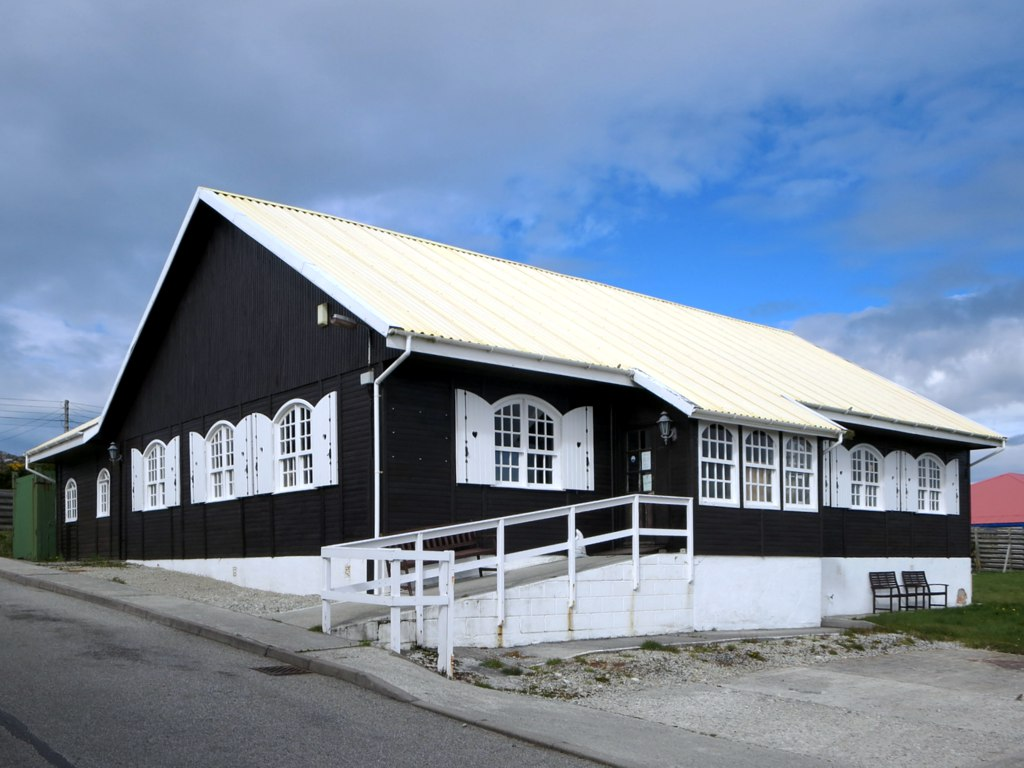
Britannia House, the former location of the museum

The Falkland Islands Museum is located at the historical dockyard site in Stanley, the capital of the Falkland Islands in the South Atlantic Ocean. It is run by the Falkland Islands Museum and National Trust (FIMNT), which is a registered charity. The museum has no formal collections policy, but it covers the natural and cultural history of the Falkland Islands. The FIMNT is also involved in the care and protection of various sites and structures of archaeological and historic importance through the islands.

The new museum features an interactive room focused on the stories of the Islanders during the 1982 conflict. There is also a large area dedicated to maritime history, which finally allows large pieces to be displayed and enjoyed. The museum now has an estimated 5,000+ items in its collection, and space and storage is still an issue despite moving the Historic Dockyard Museum, including pictures, drawings, photographs, ephemera, oral testimony, film, video, and archival material.

== History ==
The initiative to establish a permanent museum for the Falklands originated at the beginning of the 20th century, when Mrs. Allardyce, wife of the serving governor Sir William Lamond Allardyce, advocated to create a collection of exhibits of the colony's history.

Shortly before Sir William and his wife left the islands, on 9 November 1909, he officially opened the museum.

The "collection of curiosities" was housed in the old Infant School and displayed a wide range of items (some with no Falklands connection whatsoever) including hair from a prehistoric Mylodon found in a cave in South America and donated by the Minister of Russia to Chile; a collection of local birds eggs; stones from the stomach of a sea lion; and a fossilized shell.

The museum moved to the ground floor of the Town Hall and continued to enlarge its natural history collection. Most of the collection was lost when the building burned to the ground on 16 April 1944.

A small volunteer-run museum was set in the 1960s in one of the back rooms of the gymnasium building of the town. The museum soon outgrew its location, and when the Falkland Islands Company offered two rooms in their Crozier Place building, the museum moved there.

The collection was boxed up and stored for safekeeping during the Argentine occupation in 1982.

In 1987, it was decided to reopen the museum in "Britannia House" as the Government Dockyard - the ideal site for the new museum was available for some time, whereas Britannia House was almost immediately available. The building now known as Britannia House was a Brazilian prefabricated house constructed in 1981 for the Argentine airline L.A.D.E. which operated an air service to Stanley at the time. After the end of the occupation, the house was given its new name and was used by various Commanders of British Forces in the Falklands until Mount Pleasant Airport was completed in 1985 and the garrison moved out of Stanley.

The museum was officially opened on 13 February 1989 by the former governor of the Falkland Islands, Sir Rex Hunt. The move to its current location took several years, as raising money for the project took time.

The new historic dockyard development was opened on 6 September 2014.

In 2010, the Falkland Islands Museum received a complete 1878–1999 National Stamp Collection.

In August 2020, members of the Legislative Assembly of Falkland Islands approved a loan facility to the museum. The money would support the Lookout Gallery and Exhibition Hall.
