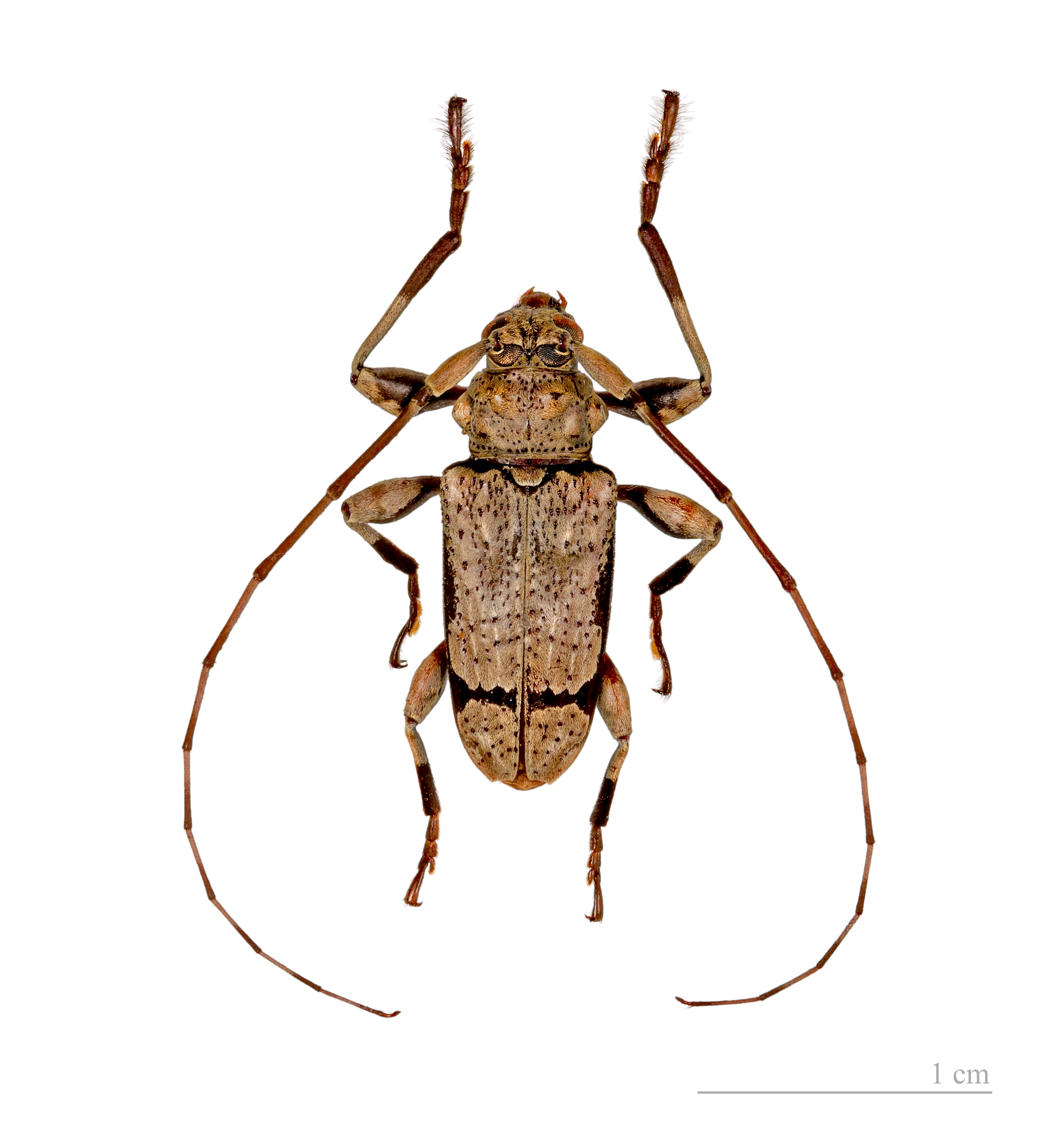

Scientific classification
- Kingdom: Animalia
- Phylum: Arthropoda
- Class: Insecta
- Order: Coleoptera
- Suborder: Polyphaga
- Infraorder: Cucujiformia
- Family: Cerambycidae
- Subfamily: Lamiinae
- Tribe: Acrocinini
- Genus: Oreodera
- Species: O. paulista

Binomial name
- Oreodera paulista Tippmann, 1953

Synonyms
- Oreodera paulista Gilmour, 1965

= Oreodera paulista =

Species of beetle

Oreodera paulista is a species of long-horned beetle in the family Cerambycidae. It is found in Paraguay, French Guiana, Brazil and Bolivia.
