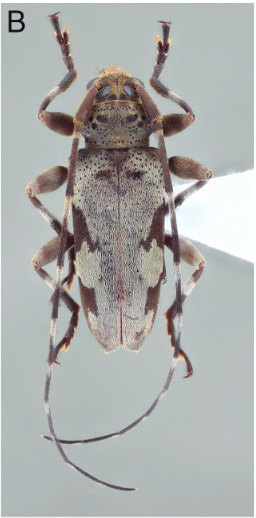

Scientific classification
- Kingdom: Animalia
- Phylum: Arthropoda
- Clade: Pancrustacea
- Class: Insecta
- Order: Coleoptera
- Suborder: Polyphaga
- Infraorder: Cucujiformia
- Family: Cerambycidae
- Subfamily: Lamiinae
- Tribe: Acrocinini
- Genus: Oreodera
- Species: O. omissa

Binomial name
- Oreodera omissa Melzer, 1932

Synonyms
- Oreodera omissa Zajciw, 1972

= Oreodera omissa =

Species of beetle

Oreodera omissa is a species of long-horned beetle in the family Cerambycidae. It is found in Brazil (Minas Gerais, Espírito Santo, Paraná).
