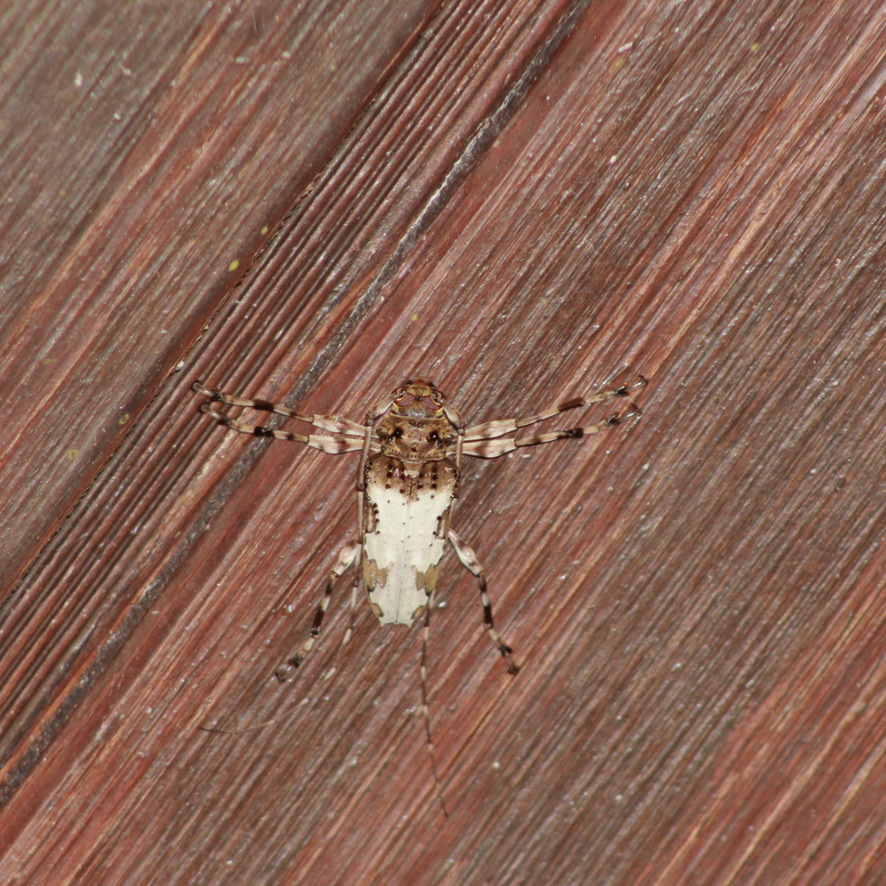
- Oreodera jacquieri, Trinidad and Tobago

Scientific classification
- Kingdom: Animalia
- Phylum: Arthropoda
- Class: Insecta
- Order: Coleoptera
- Suborder: Polyphaga
- Infraorder: Cucujiformia
- Family: Cerambycidae
- Subfamily: Lamiinae
- Tribe: Acrocinini
- Genus: Oreodera
- Species: O. jacquieri

Binomial name
- Oreodera jacquieri Thomson, 1865

Synonyms
- Oreodera jacquieri Gilmour, 1965; Oreodera jaquieri Aurivillius, 1923

= Oreodera jacquieri =

Species of beetle

Oreodera jacquieri is a species of long-horned beetle in the family Cerambycidae. It is found in Brazil, French Guiana, Venezuela, and the Caribbean.
