= Oreodera costaricensis =

Scientific classification
- Kingdom: Animalia
- Phylum: Arthropoda
- Class: Insecta
- Order: Coleoptera
- Suborder: Polyphaga
- Infraorder: Cucujiformia
- Family: Cerambycidae
- Subfamily: Lamiinae
- Tribe: Acrocinini
- Genus: Oreodera
- Species: O. costaricensis

Binomial name
- Oreodera costaricensis Thomson, 1865

Synonyms
- Oreodera costaricensis Gilmour, 1965

Species of beetle

Oreodera costaricensis is a species of long-horned beetle in the family Cerambycidae. It is found in Colombia, Costa Rica, Ecuador, El Salvador, Nicaragua and Panama.
