= Oreodera pustulosa =

Scientific classification
- Kingdom: Animalia
- Phylum: Arthropoda
- Class: Insecta
- Order: Coleoptera
- Suborder: Polyphaga
- Infraorder: Cucujiformia
- Family: Cerambycidae
- Subfamily: Lamiinae
- Tribe: Acrocinini
- Genus: Oreodera
- Species: O. pustulosa

Binomial name
- Oreodera pustulosa Monné & Fragoso, 1988

Species of beetle

Oreodera pustulosa is a species of long-horned beetle in the family Cerambycidae. It is found in Brazil and French Guiana.
