= Oreodera albata =

Scientific classification
- Kingdom: Animalia
- Phylum: Arthropoda
- Clade: Pancrustacea
- Class: Insecta
- Order: Coleoptera
- Suborder: Polyphaga
- Infraorder: Cucujiformia
- Family: Cerambycidae
- Subfamily: Lamiinae
- Tribe: Acrocinini
- Genus: Oreodera
- Species: O. albata

Binomial name
- Oreodera albata Villiers, 1971

Species of beetle

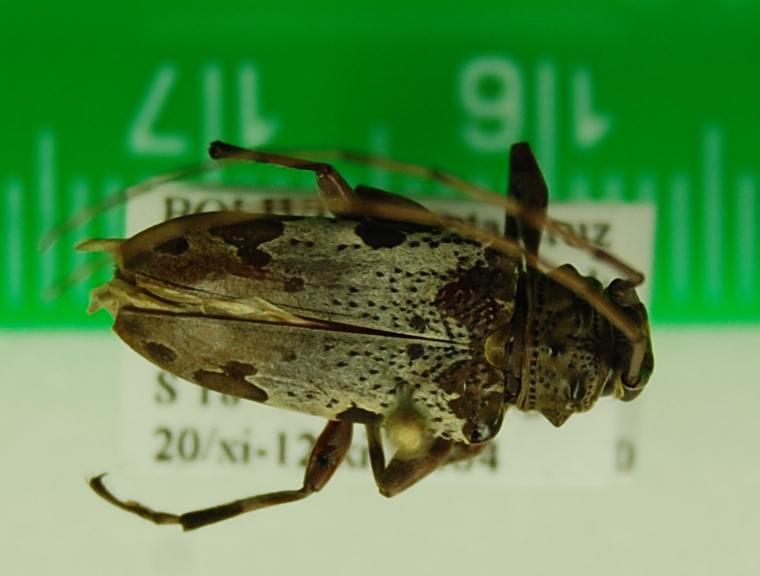
Oreodera albata in Santa Cruz, Bolivia

Oreodera albata is a species of long-horned beetle in the family Cerambycidae. It is found in Peru, Panama, French Guiana and Brazil.
