= Oreodera zikani =

Scientific classification
- Kingdom: Animalia
- Phylum: Arthropoda
- Class: Insecta
- Order: Coleoptera
- Suborder: Polyphaga
- Infraorder: Cucujiformia
- Family: Cerambycidae
- Subfamily: Lamiinae
- Tribe: Acrocinini
- Genus: Oreodera
- Species: O. zikani

Binomial name
- Oreodera zikani Melzer, 1930

Synonyms
- Oreodera zikani Zikán & Wygodzinsky, 1948

Species of beetle

Oreodera zikani is a species of long-horned beetle in the family Cerambycidae, found in Brazil. It is one of more than 100 species in the Oreodera genus, which are commonly known as flat-faced long-horned beetles.
