= Oreodera boliviana =

Scientific classification
- Kingdom: Animalia
- Phylum: Arthropoda
- Class: Insecta
- Order: Coleoptera
- Suborder: Polyphaga
- Infraorder: Cucujiformia
- Family: Cerambycidae
- Subfamily: Lamiinae
- Tribe: Acrocinini
- Genus: Oreodera
- Species: O. boliviana

Binomial name
- Oreodera boliviana Tippmann, 1960

Synonyms
- Oreodera boliviana Gilmour, 1965

Species of beetle

Oreodera boliviana is a species of long-horned beetle in the family Cerambycidae. It is found in Bolivia, Brazil, and Peru.
