= Oreodera affinis =

Scientific classification
- Kingdom: Animalia
- Phylum: Arthropoda
- Class: Insecta
- Order: Coleoptera
- Suborder: Polyphaga
- Infraorder: Cucujiformia
- Family: Cerambycidae
- Subfamily: Lamiinae
- Tribe: Acrocinini
- Genus: Oreodera
- Species: O. affinis

Binomial name
- Oreodera affinis Gahan, 1892

Synonyms
- Oreodera affinis Gilmour, 1965

Species of beetle

Oreodera affinis is a species of long-horned beetle in the family Cerambycidae. It is found in Guatemala.

This species was described by Charles Joseph Gahan in 1892.
