= O. exigua =

O. exigua may refer to:

- Ophiothrix exigua, a brittle star
- Oplitis exigua, a mite with a single pair of spiracles positioned laterally on the body
- Oreodera exigua, a longhorn beetle
- Orthomecyna exigua, a moth endemic to Hawaii
- Oryzopsis exigua, a true grass
- Oscinella exigua, a European fly
- Osminia exigua, a clearwing moth
- Ozola exigua, a geometer moth
