= Oreodera achatina =

Scientific classification
- Kingdom: Animalia
- Phylum: Arthropoda
- Class: Insecta
- Order: Coleoptera
- Suborder: Polyphaga
- Infraorder: Cucujiformia
- Family: Cerambycidae
- Subfamily: Lamiinae
- Tribe: Acrocinini
- Genus: Oreodera
- Species: O. achatina

Binomial name
- Oreodera achatina Erichson, 1847

Synonyms
- Oreodera achatina Gilmour, 1965; Oreodera lacteo-strigata Bates, 1861; Oreodera lacteostrigata Blackwelder, 1946

Species of beetle

Oreodera achatina is a species of long-horned beetle in the family Cerambycidae. It is found in French Guiana, Suriname, Peru, and Brazil.
