= Oreodera clarkei =

Scientific classification
- Kingdom: Animalia
- Phylum: Arthropoda
- Class: Insecta
- Order: Coleoptera
- Suborder: Polyphaga
- Infraorder: Cucujiformia
- Family: Cerambycidae
- Subfamily: Lamiinae
- Tribe: Acrocinini
- Genus: Oreodera
- Species: O. clarkei

Binomial name
- Oreodera clarkei Galileo, Santos-Silva & Wappes, 2017

Species of beetle

Oreodera clarkei is a species of long-horned beetle in the family Cerambycidae, found in Bolivia.
