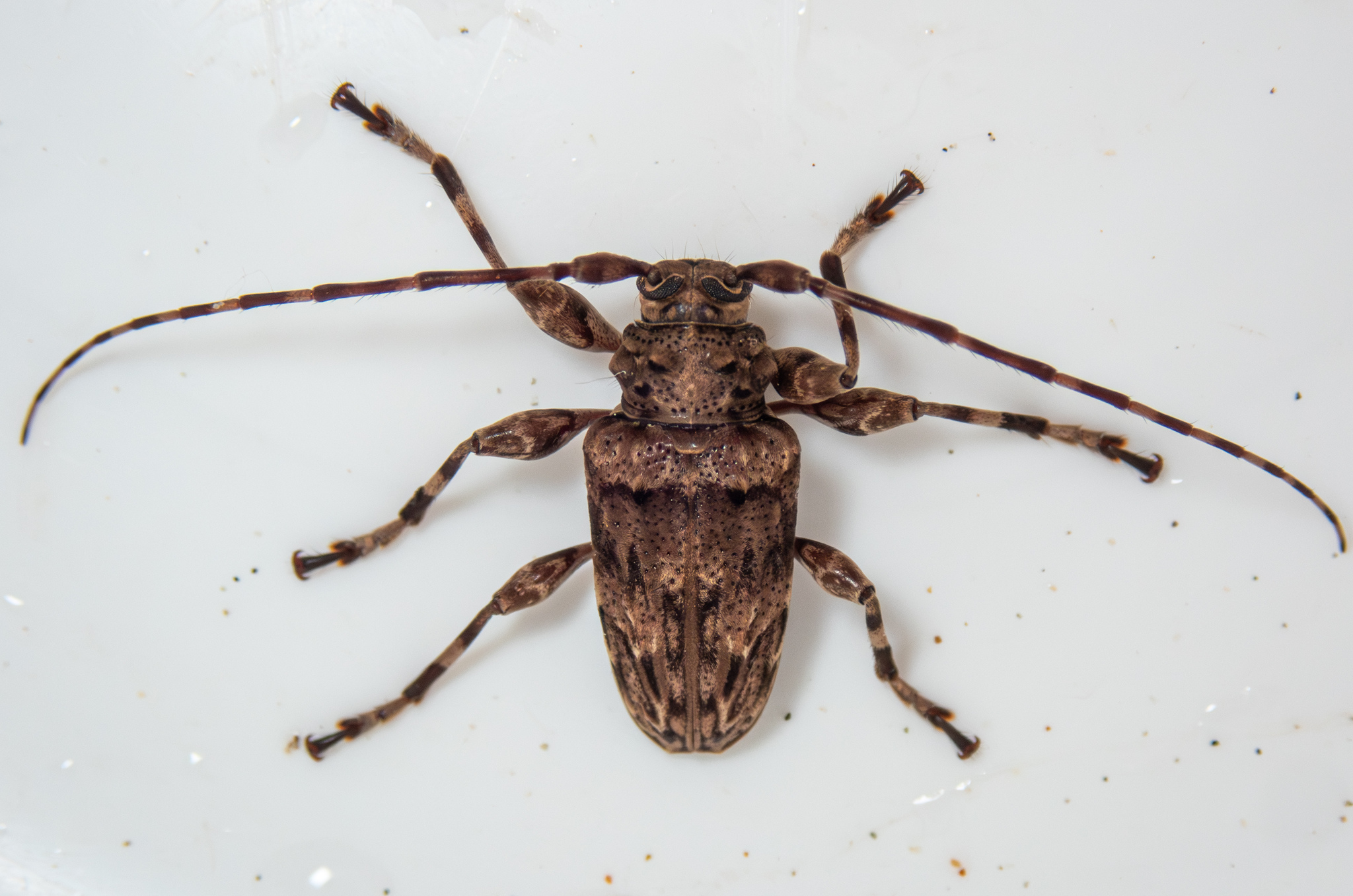
- Oreodera graphiptera, Costa Rica

Scientific classification
- Kingdom: Animalia
- Phylum: Arthropoda
- Class: Insecta
- Order: Coleoptera
- Suborder: Polyphaga
- Infraorder: Cucujiformia
- Family: Cerambycidae
- Subfamily: Lamiinae
- Tribe: Acrocinini
- Genus: Oreodera
- Species: O. graphiptera

Binomial name
- Oreodera graphiptera Bates, 1885

Synonyms
- Oreodera graphiptera Aurivillius, 1923

= Oreodera graphiptera =

Species of beetle

Oreodera graphiptera is a species of long-horned beetle in the family Cerambycidae, found in Costa Rica, Honduras, Nicaragua and Panama. It was described by Henry Walter Bates in 1885.
