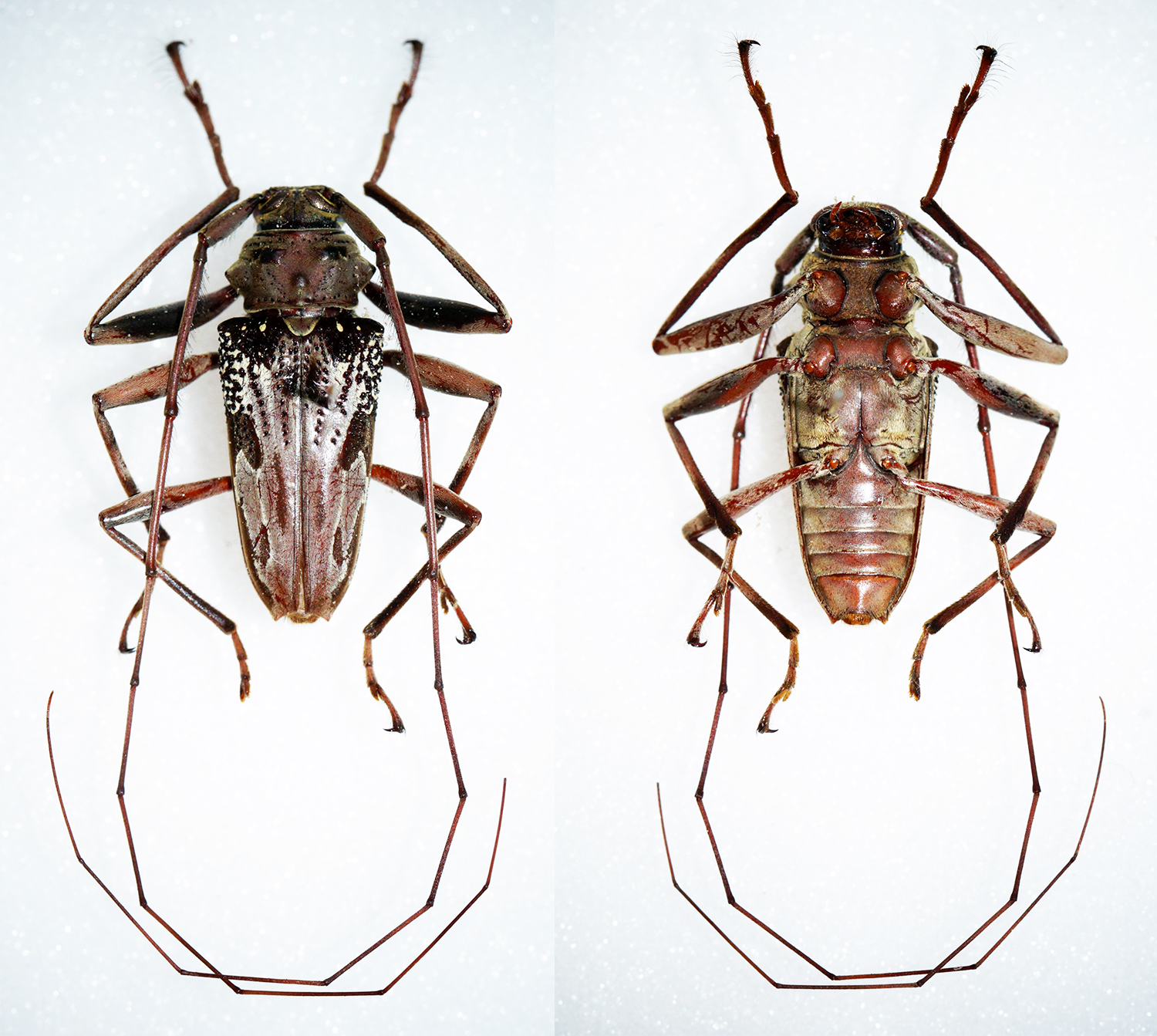

Scientific classification
- Kingdom: Animalia
- Phylum: Arthropoda
- Class: Insecta
- Order: Coleoptera
- Suborder: Polyphaga
- Infraorder: Cucujiformia
- Family: Cerambycidae
- Subfamily: Lamiinae
- Tribe: Acrocinini
- Genus: Oreodera
- Species: O. neglecta

Binomial name
- Oreodera neglecta Melzer, 1932

Synonyms
- Oreodera neglecta Gilmour, 1965

= Oreodera neglecta =

Species of beetle

Oreodera neglecta is a species of long-horned beetle in the family Cerambycidae. It is found in Brazil, Ecuador, French Guiana and Suriname.
