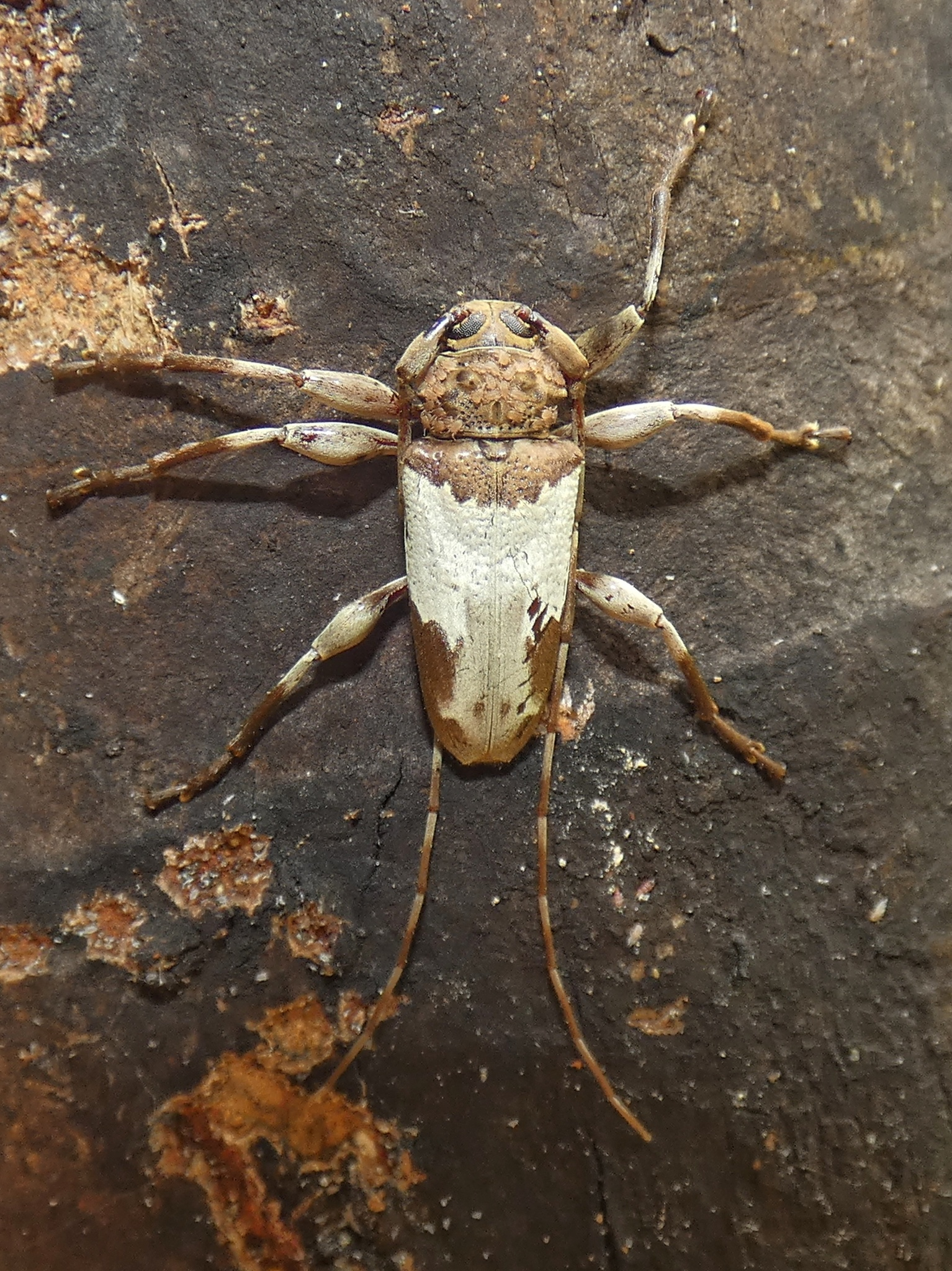
- Oreodera canotogata, Panamá

Scientific classification
- Kingdom: Animalia
- Phylum: Arthropoda
- Class: Insecta
- Order: Coleoptera
- Suborder: Polyphaga
- Infraorder: Cucujiformia
- Family: Cerambycidae
- Subfamily: Lamiinae
- Tribe: Acrocinini
- Genus: Oreodera
- Species: O. canotogata

Binomial name
- Oreodera canotogata Bates, 1872

Synonyms
- Oreodera canotogata Gilmour, 1965

= Oreodera canotogata =

Species of beetle

Oreodera canotogata is a species of long-horned beetle in the family Cerambycidae. It is found in Panama, Costa Rica and Nicaragua.
