= Oreodera boucheri =

Scientific classification
- Kingdom: Animalia
- Phylum: Arthropoda
- Clade: Pancrustacea
- Class: Insecta
- Order: Coleoptera
- Suborder: Polyphaga
- Infraorder: Cucujiformia
- Family: Cerambycidae
- Subfamily: Lamiinae
- Tribe: Acrocinini
- Genus: Oreodera
- Species: O. boucheri

Binomial name
- Oreodera boucheri Néouze & Tavakilian, 2010

Synonyms
- Oeodera boucheri Morvan & Roguet, 2013

Species of beetle

Oreodera boucheri is a species of long-horned beetle in the family Cerambycidae. It is found in French Guiana.
