= Oreodera corticina =

Scientific classification
- Kingdom: Animalia
- Phylum: Arthropoda
- Class: Insecta
- Order: Coleoptera
- Suborder: Polyphaga
- Infraorder: Cucujiformia
- Family: Cerambycidae
- Subfamily: Lamiinae
- Tribe: Acrocinini
- Genus: Oreodera
- Species: O. corticina

Binomial name
- Oreodera corticina Thomson, 1865

Synonyms
- Oreodera corticina Aurivillius, 1923; Oreodera obsoleta Maes et al., 1994

Species of beetle

Oreodera corticina is a species of long-horned beetle in the family Cerambycidae. It is found in Nicaragua, Mexico, El Salvador, Guatemala and Honduras.
