= Oreodera simplex =

Scientific classification
- Kingdom: Animalia
- Phylum: Arthropoda
- Class: Insecta
- Order: Coleoptera
- Suborder: Polyphaga
- Infraorder: Cucujiformia
- Family: Cerambycidae
- Subfamily: Lamiinae
- Tribe: Acrocinini
- Genus: Oreodera
- Species: O. simplex

Binomial name
- Oreodera simplex Bates, 1861

Synonyms
- Anoreina pinibaiuba Martins, Galileo & Limeira-de-Oliveira, 2009; Anoreina pinimaiuba Martins & Galileo, 2008; Oreodera simplex Gilmour, 1965

Species of beetle

Oreodera simplex is a species of long-horned beetle in the family Cerambycidae. It is found in Bolivia, Brazil, Ecuador and French Guiana.
