= Oreodera hoffmanni =

Scientific classification
- Kingdom: Animalia
- Phylum: Arthropoda
- Class: Insecta
- Order: Coleoptera
- Suborder: Polyphaga
- Infraorder: Cucujiformia
- Family: Cerambycidae
- Subfamily: Lamiinae
- Tribe: Acrocinini
- Genus: Oreodera
- Species: O. hoffmanni

Binomial name
- Oreodera hoffmanni (Thomson, 1860)

Synonyms
- Acrocinus hoffmanni Thomson, 1860; Macropophora hoffmanni Monné & Giesbert, 1994; Macropophora hoffmannii Thomson, 1878; Macropophora hofmanni Aurivillius, 1923; Macropophora lateralis Aurivillius, 1923; Macropus lateralis Gemminger & Harold, 1873; Oreodera hofmanni Gemminger & Harold, 1873

Species of beetle

Oreodera hoffmanni is a species of long-horned beetle in the family Cerambycidae. It is found in Brazil and Paraguay.
