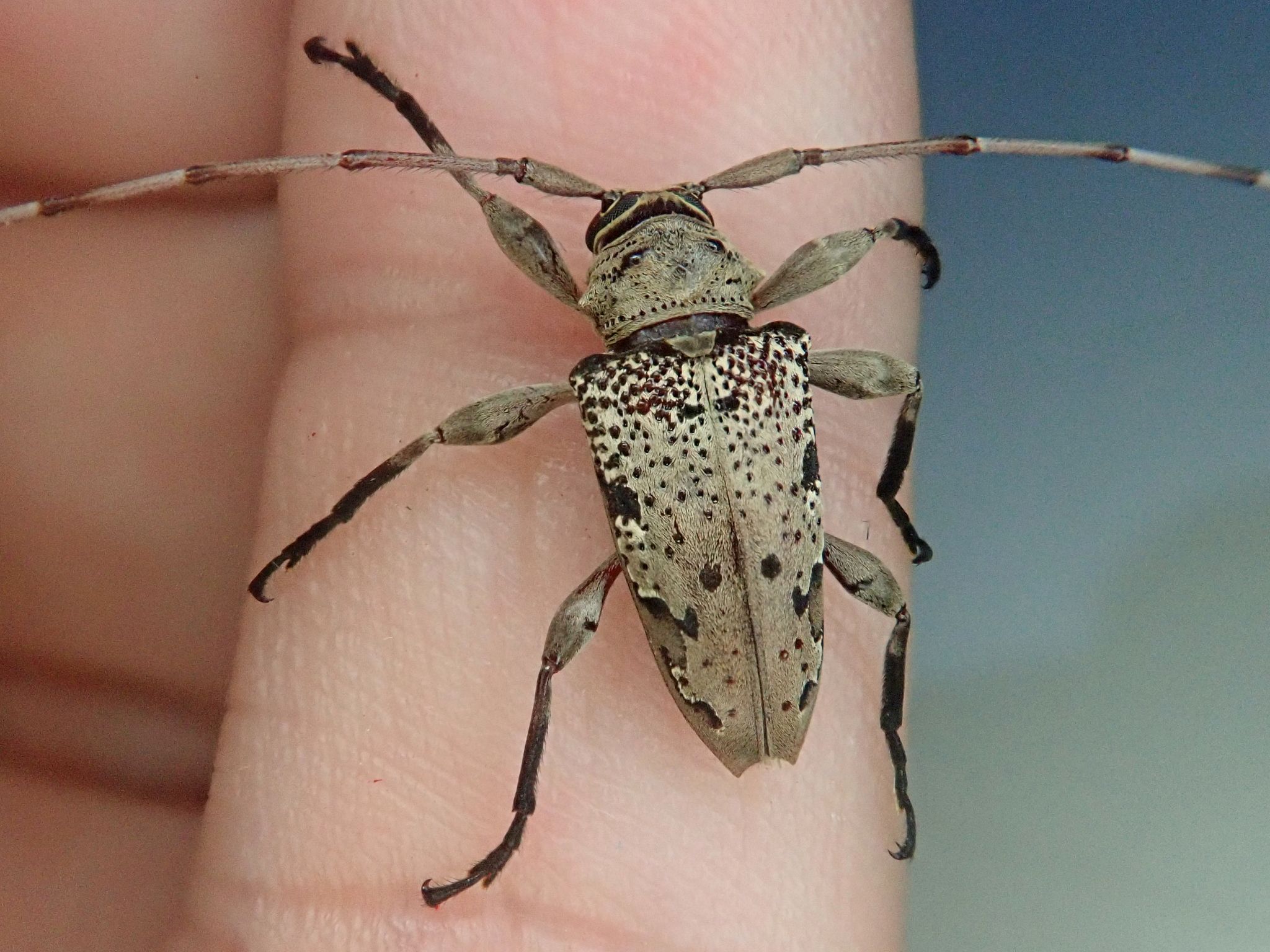
- Oreodera aerumnosa, Brazil

Scientific classification
- Kingdom: Animalia
- Phylum: Arthropoda
- Class: Insecta
- Order: Coleoptera
- Suborder: Polyphaga
- Infraorder: Cucujiformia
- Family: Cerambycidae
- Subfamily: Lamiinae
- Tribe: Acrocinini
- Genus: Oreodera
- Species: O. aerumnosa

Binomial name
- Oreodera aerumnosa Erichson, 1847

Synonyms
- Aegomorphus remotus Gemminger & Harold, 1873; Oreodera aerumnosa Aurivillius, 1923; Oreodera remota Zikán & Zikán, 1944

= Oreodera aerumnosa =

Species of beetle

Oreodera aerumnosa is a species of long-horned beetle in the family Cerambycidae. It is found in Central and South America.
