= Oreodera fasciculosa =

Scientific classification
- Kingdom: Animalia
- Phylum: Arthropoda
- Class: Insecta
- Order: Coleoptera
- Suborder: Polyphaga
- Infraorder: Cucujiformia
- Family: Cerambycidae
- Subfamily: Lamiinae
- Tribe: Acrocinini
- Genus: Oreodera
- Species: O. fasciculosa

Binomial name
- Oreodera fasciculosa Thomson, 1865

Synonyms
- Oreodera fasciculosa Aurivillius, 1923; Oreodera fasciculosus Chemsak, Linsley & Noguera, 1992; Oreodera hispida Lameere, 1883

Species of beetle

Oreodera fasciculosa is a species of long-horned beetle in the family Cerambycidae. It can be found in neotropical regions such as Chiapas and Veracruz in Mexico and in Central America.
