= Oreodera cocoensis =

Scientific classification
- Kingdom: Animalia
- Phylum: Arthropoda
- Class: Insecta
- Order: Coleoptera
- Suborder: Polyphaga
- Infraorder: Cucujiformia
- Family: Cerambycidae
- Subfamily: Lamiinae
- Tribe: Acrocinini
- Genus: Oreodera
- Species: O. cocoensis

Binomial name
- Oreodera cocoensis (Linsley & Chemsak, 1966)

Synonyms
- Acanthoderes cocoensis Monné & Giesbert, 1994

Species of beetle

Oreodera cocoensis is a species of long-horned beetle in the family Cerambycidae. It is found in Isla del Coco, Costa Rica.
