= Oreodera undulata =

Scientific classification
- Kingdom: Animalia
- Phylum: Arthropoda
- Class: Insecta
- Order: Coleoptera
- Suborder: Polyphaga
- Infraorder: Cucujiformia
- Family: Cerambycidae
- Subfamily: Lamiinae
- Tribe: Acrocinini
- Genus: Oreodera
- Species: O. undulata

Binomial name
- Oreodera undulata Bates, 1861

Synonyms
- Oreodera undulata Gilmour, 1965

Species of beetle

Oreodera undulata is a species of long-horned beetle in the family Cerambycidae. It is found in Ecuador, French Guiana, Suriname and Brazil.
