= Oreodera cangaceira =

Scientific classification
- Domain: Eukaryota
- Kingdom: Animalia
- Phylum: Arthropoda
- Class: Insecta
- Order: Coleoptera
- Suborder: Polyphaga
- Infraorder: Cucujiformia
- Family: Cerambycidae
- Subfamily: Lamiinae
- Tribe: Acrocinini
- Genus: Oreodera
- Species: O. cangaceira

Binomial name
- Oreodera cangaceira Nascimento, Souza & Bravo, 2021

Species of beetle

Oreodera cangaceira is a species of long-horned beetle in the family Cerambycidae.
