= Oreodera goudotii =

Scientific classification
- Kingdom: Animalia
- Phylum: Arthropoda
- Class: Insecta
- Order: Coleoptera
- Suborder: Polyphaga
- Infraorder: Cucujiformia
- Family: Cerambycidae
- Subfamily: Lamiinae
- Tribe: Acrocinini
- Genus: Oreodera
- Species: O. goudotii

Binomial name
- Oreodera goudotii (White, 1855)

Synonyms
- Acanthocinus goudoti Gemminger & Harold, 1873; Acanthocinus goudotii White, 1855; Astyochus goudoti Blackwelder, 1946; Oreodera goudoti Gilmour, 1965

Species of beetle

Oreodera goudotii is a species of long-horned beetle in the family Cerambycidae. It is found in Colombia.
