= Oreodera fluctuosa =

Scientific classification
- Kingdom: Animalia
- Phylum: Arthropoda
- Class: Insecta
- Order: Coleoptera
- Suborder: Polyphaga
- Infraorder: Cucujiformia
- Family: Cerambycidae
- Subfamily: Lamiinae
- Tribe: Acrocinini
- Genus: Oreodera
- Species: O. fluctuosa

Binomial name
- Oreodera fluctuosa Bates, 1861

Synonyms
- Oreodera fluctuosa Gilmour, 1965; Oreodera kahli Williams, 1928

Species of beetle

Oreodera fluctuosa is a species of long-horned beetle in the family Cerambycidae, found in Central and South America.
