= Oreodera kawasae =

Scientific classification
- Kingdom: Animalia
- Phylum: Arthropoda
- Clade: Pancrustacea
- Class: Insecta
- Order: Coleoptera
- Suborder: Polyphaga
- Infraorder: Cucujiformia
- Family: Cerambycidae
- Subfamily: Lamiinae
- Tribe: Acrocinini
- Genus: Oreodera
- Species: O. kawasae

Binomial name
- Oreodera kawasae Santos-Silva, Roie & Jocqué, 2021

Species of beetle

Oreodera kawasae is a species of long-horned beetle in the family Cerambycidae, native to Honduras.
