= Oreodera hassenteufeli =

Scientific classification
- Kingdom: Animalia
- Phylum: Arthropoda
- Class: Insecta
- Order: Coleoptera
- Suborder: Polyphaga
- Infraorder: Cucujiformia
- Family: Cerambycidae
- Subfamily: Lamiinae
- Tribe: Acrocinini
- Genus: Oreodera
- Species: O. hassenteufeli

Binomial name
- Oreodera hassenteufeli (Fuchs, 1958)

Synonyms
- Acanthoderes hassenteufeli Gilmour, 1965; Psapharochrus hassenteufeli Wappes et al., 2006

Species of beetle

Oreodera hassenteufeli is a species of long-horned beetle in the family Cerambycidae. It is found in Bolivia.
