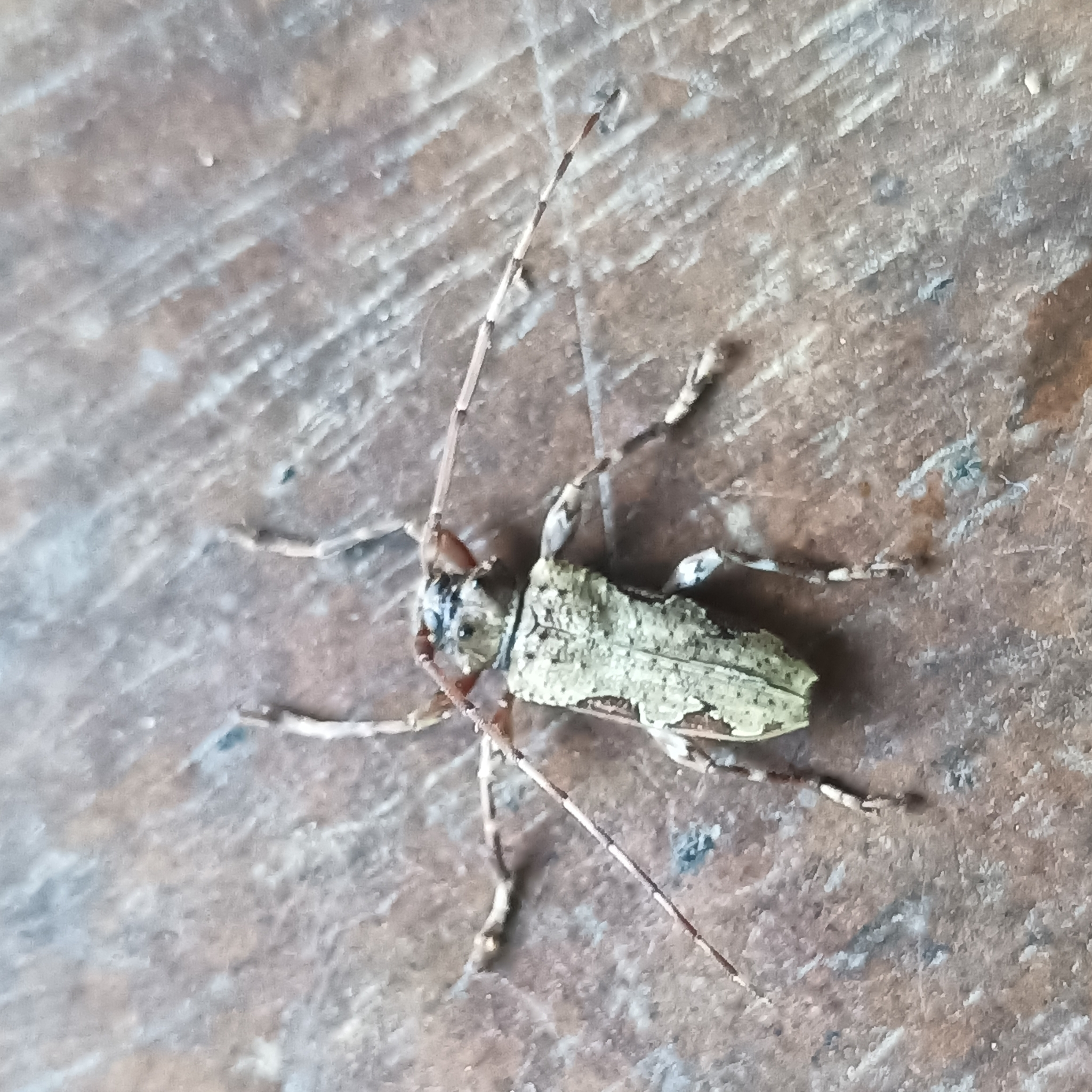
- Oreodera bituberculata, French Guyana

Scientific classification
- Kingdom: Animalia
- Phylum: Arthropoda
- Class: Insecta
- Order: Coleoptera
- Suborder: Polyphaga
- Infraorder: Cucujiformia
- Family: Cerambycidae
- Subfamily: Lamiinae
- Tribe: Acrocinini
- Genus: Oreodera
- Species: O. bituberculata

Binomial name
- Oreodera bituberculata Bates, 1861

= Oreodera bituberculata =

Species of beetle

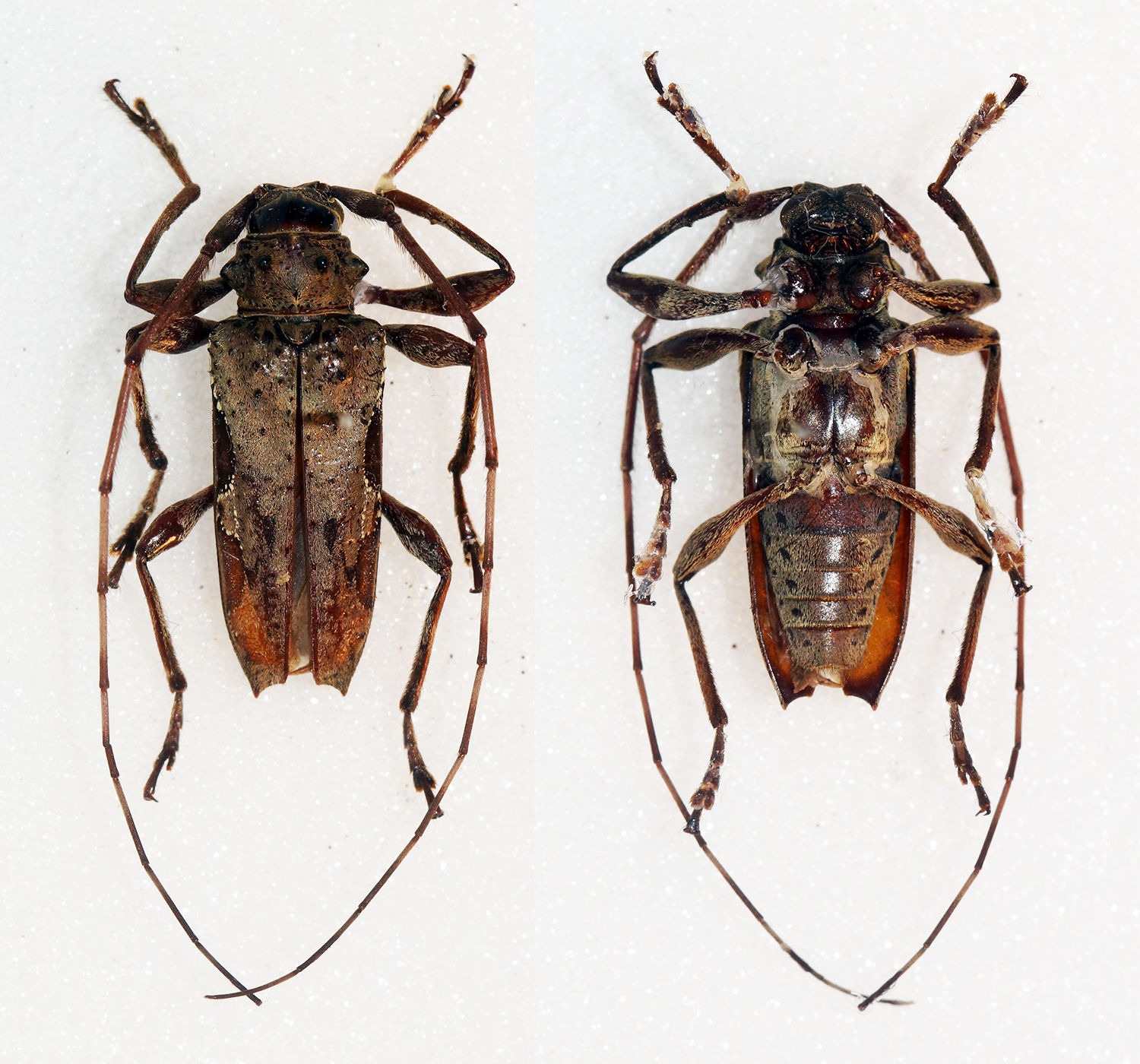

Oreodera bituberculata is a species of beetle in the family Cerambycidae, found in Central and South America. It was described by Bates in 1861.
