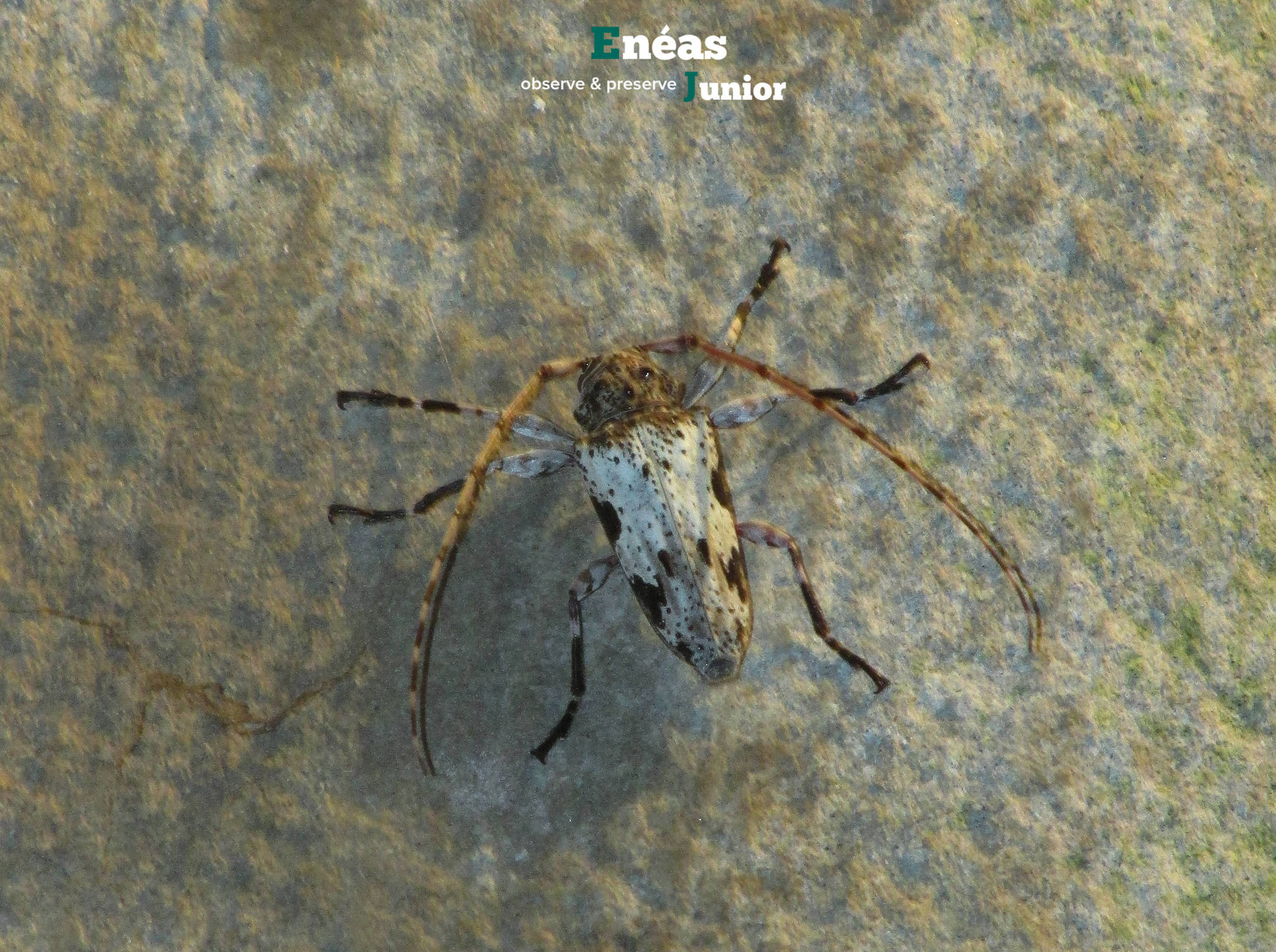
- Oreodera quinquetuberculata, Brazil

Scientific classification
- Kingdom: Animalia
- Phylum: Arthropoda
- Class: Insecta
- Order: Coleoptera
- Suborder: Polyphaga
- Infraorder: Cucujiformia
- Family: Cerambycidae
- Subfamily: Lamiinae
- Tribe: Acrocinini
- Genus: Oreodera
- Species: O. quinquetuberculata

Binomial name
- Oreodera quinquetuberculata (Drapiez, 1820)

Synonyms
- Lamia 5-tuberculata Drapiez, 1820; Lamia trinodosa Germar, 1824; Oreodera 5-tuberculata White, 1855; Oreodera quinquetuberculata Duffy, 1960; Oreodera trinodosa Germar, 1839

= Oreodera quinquetuberculata =

Species of beetle

Oreodera quinquetuberculata is a species of long-horned beetle in the family Cerambycidae. It is found in Argentina, Bolivia, Brazil and Paraguay.
