= Oreodera inscripta =

Scientific classification
- Kingdom: Animalia
- Phylum: Arthropoda
- Class: Insecta
- Order: Coleoptera
- Suborder: Polyphaga
- Infraorder: Cucujiformia
- Family: Cerambycidae
- Subfamily: Lamiinae
- Tribe: Acrocinini
- Genus: Oreodera
- Species: O. inscripta

Binomial name
- Oreodera inscripta Bates, 1872

Synonyms
- Oreodera inscripta Aurivillius, 1923; Oreodera inscriptipennis Bates, 1880

Species of beetle

Oreodera inscripta is a species of long-horned beetle in the family Cerambycidae. It is found in Costa Rica, Honduras, Nicaragua and Panama.
