= Oreodera lateralis =

Scientific classification
- Kingdom: Animalia
- Phylum: Arthropoda
- Clade: Pancrustacea
- Class: Insecta
- Order: Coleoptera
- Suborder: Polyphaga
- Infraorder: Cucujiformia
- Family: Cerambycidae
- Subfamily: Lamiinae
- Tribe: Acrocinini
- Genus: Oreodera
- Species: O. lateralis

Binomial name
- Oreodera lateralis (Olivier, 1795)

Synonyms
- Cerambyx lateralis Schönherr, 1817; Oreodera lateralis Aurivillius, 1923

Species of beetle

Oreodera lateralis is a species of long-horned beetle in the family Cerambycidae. It is found in Porto Rico, Cuba and Panama.

This species was described by Guillaume-Antoine Olivier in 1795.
