= Oreodera curvata =

Scientific classification
- Kingdom: Animalia
- Phylum: Arthropoda
- Class: Insecta
- Order: Coleoptera
- Suborder: Polyphaga
- Infraorder: Cucujiformia
- Family: Cerambycidae
- Subfamily: Lamiinae
- Tribe: Acrocinini
- Genus: Oreodera
- Species: O. curvata

Binomial name
- Oreodera curvata Martins & Monné, 1993

Species of beetle

Oreodera curvata is a species of long-horned beetle in the family Cerambycidae. It is found in Brazil, Colombia, French Guiana and Suriname.
