= Oreodera trinitensis =

Scientific classification
- Kingdom: Animalia
- Phylum: Arthropoda
- Class: Insecta
- Order: Coleoptera
- Suborder: Polyphaga
- Infraorder: Cucujiformia
- Family: Cerambycidae
- Subfamily: Lamiinae
- Tribe: Acrocinini
- Genus: Oreodera
- Species: O. trinitensis

Binomial name
- Oreodera trinitensis Néouze & Tavakilian, 2010

Species of beetle

Oreodera trinitensis is a species of long-horned beetle in the family Cerambycidae. It is found in French Guiana.
