= Oreodera brailovskyi =

Scientific classification
- Kingdom: Animalia
- Phylum: Arthropoda
- Class: Insecta
- Order: Coleoptera
- Suborder: Polyphaga
- Infraorder: Cucujiformia
- Family: Cerambycidae
- Subfamily: Lamiinae
- Tribe: Acrocinini
- Genus: Oreodera
- Species: O. brailovskyi

Binomial name
- Oreodera brailovskyi Chemsak & Noguera, 1993

Species of beetle

Oreodera brailovskyi is a species of beetle in the family Cerambycidae, specifically classified under the subfamily Lamiinae, which also known as lamiines or flat-faced longhorned beetles. It was described by Chemsak and Noguera in 1993. It is found in Mexico.
