= Oreodera pergeri =

Scientific classification
- Domain: Eukaryota
- Kingdom: Animalia
- Phylum: Arthropoda
- Class: Insecta
- Order: Coleoptera
- Suborder: Polyphaga
- Infraorder: Cucujiformia
- Family: Cerambycidae
- Subfamily: Lamiinae
- Tribe: Acrocinini
- Genus: Oreodera
- Species: O. pergeri

Binomial name
- Oreodera pergeri Wappes & Santos-Silva, 2019

Species of beetle

Oreodera pergeri is a species of long-horned beetle in the family Cerambycidae, found in Bolivia.
