= Oreodera tuberculata =

Scientific classification
- Kingdom: Animalia
- Phylum: Arthropoda
- Class: Insecta
- Order: Coleoptera
- Suborder: Polyphaga
- Infraorder: Cucujiformia
- Family: Cerambycidae
- Subfamily: Lamiinae
- Tribe: Acrocinini
- Genus: Oreodera
- Species: O. tuberculata

Binomial name
- Oreodera tuberculata Thomson, 1865

Synonyms
- Oreodera tuberculata Aurivillius, 1923

Species of beetle

Oreodera tuberculata is a species of long-horned beetle in the family Cerambycidae. It is found in Bolivia, Colombia, Ecuador and Peru.
