= Oreodera sexplagiata =

Scientific classification
- Kingdom: Animalia
- Phylum: Arthropoda
- Class: Insecta
- Order: Coleoptera
- Suborder: Polyphaga
- Infraorder: Cucujiformia
- Family: Cerambycidae
- Subfamily: Lamiinae
- Tribe: Acrocinini
- Genus: Oreodera
- Species: O. sexplagiata

Binomial name
- Oreodera sexplagiata Melzer, 1931

Synonyms
- Oreodera sexplagiata Zajciw, 1972

Species of beetle

Oreodera sexplagiata is a species of long-horned beetle in the family Cerambycidae. It is found in Brazil.
