= Oreodera cinerea =

Scientific classification
- Kingdom: Animalia
- Phylum: Arthropoda
- Class: Insecta
- Order: Coleoptera
- Suborder: Polyphaga
- Infraorder: Cucujiformia
- Family: Cerambycidae
- Subfamily: Lamiinae
- Tribe: Acrocinini
- Genus: Oreodera
- Species: O. cinerea

Binomial name
- Oreodera cinerea Audinet-Serville, 1835

Synonyms
- Oreodera angustata Gilmour, 1965; Oreodera cinerea Aurivillius, 1923

Species of beetle

Oreodera cinerea is a species of long-horned beetle in the family Cerambycidae. It is found in Venezuela and Brazil.
