= Oreodera granulipennis =

Scientific classification
- Kingdom: Animalia
- Phylum: Arthropoda
- Class: Insecta
- Order: Coleoptera
- Suborder: Polyphaga
- Infraorder: Cucujiformia
- Family: Cerambycidae
- Subfamily: Lamiinae
- Tribe: Acrocinini
- Genus: Oreodera
- Species: O. granulipennis

Binomial name
- Oreodera granulipennis Zajciw, 1963

Synonyms
- Oreodera granulipennis Gilmour, 1965

Species of beetle

Oreodera granulipennis is a species of long-horned beetle in the family Cerambycidae. It is found in Venezuela.
