= Oreodera forsteri =

Scientific classification
- Kingdom: Animalia
- Phylum: Arthropoda
- Class: Insecta
- Order: Coleoptera
- Suborder: Polyphaga
- Infraorder: Cucujiformia
- Family: Cerambycidae
- Subfamily: Lamiinae
- Tribe: Acrocinini
- Genus: Oreodera
- Species: O. forsteri

Binomial name
- Oreodera forsteri Tippmann, 1960

Synonyms
- Oreodera forsteri Gilmour, 1965

Species of beetle

Oreodera forsteri is a species of long-horned beetle in the family Cerambycidae. It is found in Peru and Bolivia.
