= Oreodera sericata =

Scientific classification
- Kingdom: Animalia
- Phylum: Arthropoda
- Clade: Pancrustacea
- Class: Insecta
- Order: Coleoptera
- Suborder: Polyphaga
- Infraorder: Cucujiformia
- Family: Cerambycidae
- Subfamily: Lamiinae
- Tribe: Acrocinini
- Genus: Oreodera
- Species: O. sericata

Binomial name
- Oreodera sericata Bates, 1861

Synonyms
- Oreodera sercata Melzer, 1930; Oreodera sericata Aurivillius, 1923

Species of beetle

Oreodera sericata is a species of long-horned beetle in the family Cerambycidae. It is found in Ecuador and Brazil.
