= Oreodera purpurascens =

Scientific classification
- Kingdom: Animalia
- Phylum: Arthropoda
- Class: Insecta
- Order: Coleoptera
- Suborder: Polyphaga
- Infraorder: Cucujiformia
- Family: Cerambycidae
- Subfamily: Lamiinae
- Tribe: Acrocinini
- Genus: Oreodera
- Species: O. purpurascens

Binomial name
- Oreodera purpurascens Bates, 1880

Synonyms
- Oreodera purpurascens Gilmour, 1965

Species of beetle

Oreodera purpurascens is a species of long-horned beetle in the family Cerambycidae. It is found in Costa Rica, Guatemala and Honduras.
