= Oreodera c-album =

Scientific classification
- Kingdom: Animalia
- Phylum: Arthropoda
- Class: Insecta
- Order: Coleoptera
- Suborder: Polyphaga
- Infraorder: Cucujiformia
- Family: Cerambycidae
- Subfamily: Lamiinae
- Tribe: Acrocinini
- Genus: Oreodera
- Species: O. c-album

Binomial name
- Oreodera c-album Bates, 1872

Synonyms
- Oreodera c-album Aurivillius, 1923

Species of beetle

Oreodera c-album is a species of long-horned beetle in the family Cerambycidae. It is found in Costa Rica, Nicaragua and Venezuela.
