= Oreodera granulifera =

Scientific classification
- Kingdom: Animalia
- Phylum: Arthropoda
- Class: Insecta
- Order: Coleoptera
- Suborder: Polyphaga
- Infraorder: Cucujiformia
- Family: Cerambycidae
- Subfamily: Lamiinae
- Tribe: Acrocinini
- Genus: Oreodera
- Species: O. granulifera

Binomial name
- Oreodera granulifera Bates, 1872

Synonyms
- Oreodera granulifera Aurivillius, 1923; Oreodera pulcherrima Júlio, Giorgi & Monné, 2000

Species of beetle

Oreodera granulifera is a species of long-horned beetle in the family Cerambycidae. It is found in Guatemala, Colombia, Nicaragua, Costa Rica and Panama.
