= Oreodera copei =

Scientific classification
- Kingdom: Animalia
- Phylum: Arthropoda
- Class: Insecta
- Order: Coleoptera
- Suborder: Polyphaga
- Infraorder: Cucujiformia
- Family: Cerambycidae
- Subfamily: Lamiinae
- Tribe: Acrocinini
- Genus: Oreodera
- Species: O. copei

Binomial name
- Oreodera copei McCarty, 2001

Species of beetle

Oreodera copei is a species of long-horned beetle in the family Cerambycidae. It is found in Mexico.
