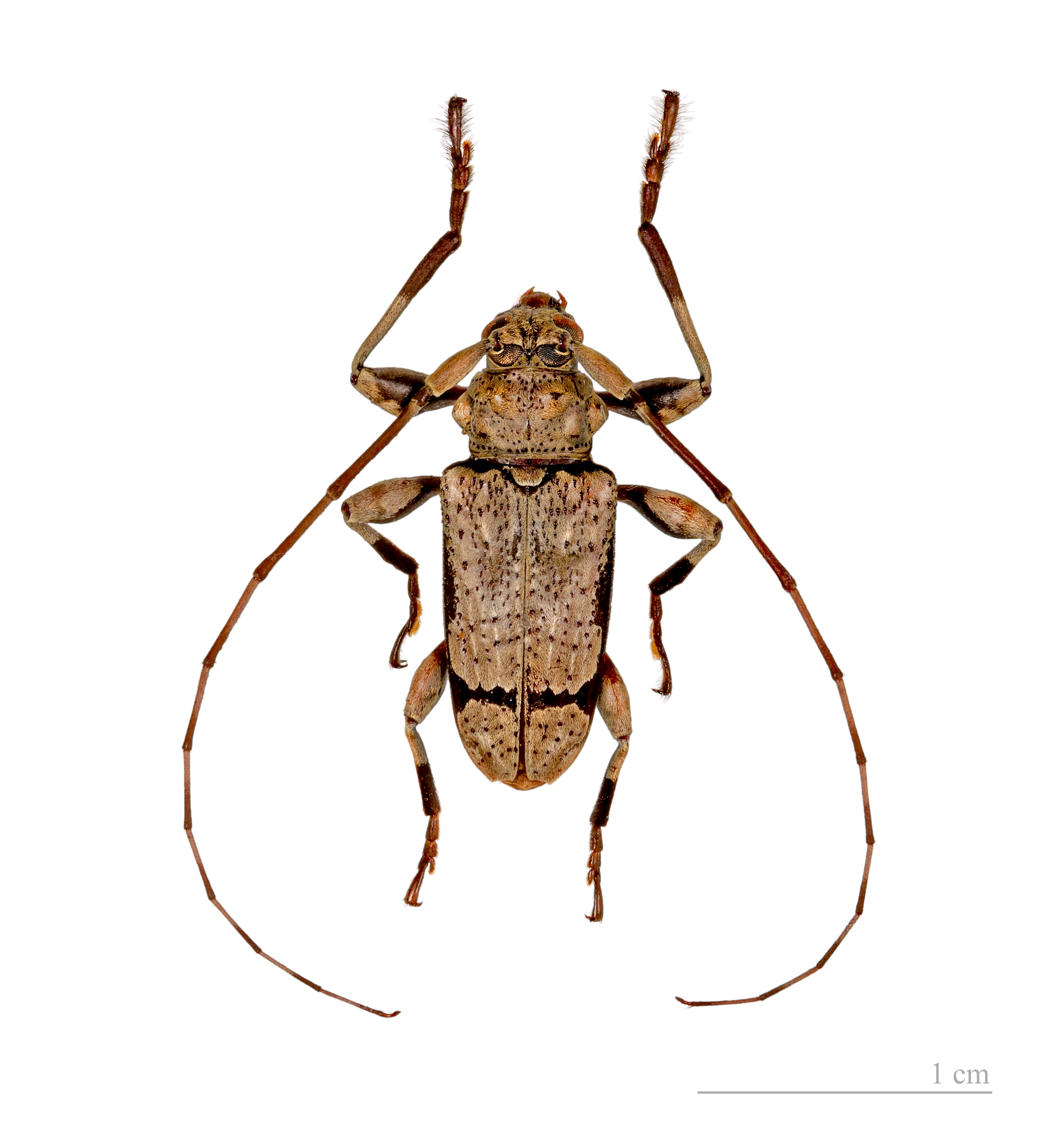
- Oreodera paulista MHNT

Scientific classification
- Domain: Eukaryota
- Kingdom: Animalia
- Phylum: Arthropoda
- Class: Insecta
- Order: Coleoptera
- Suborder: Polyphaga
- Infraorder: Cucujiformia
- Family: Cerambycidae
- Subfamily: Lamiinae
- Tribe: Acrocinini
- Genus: Oreodera; Audinet-Serville, 1835

= Oreodera =

Genus of beetles

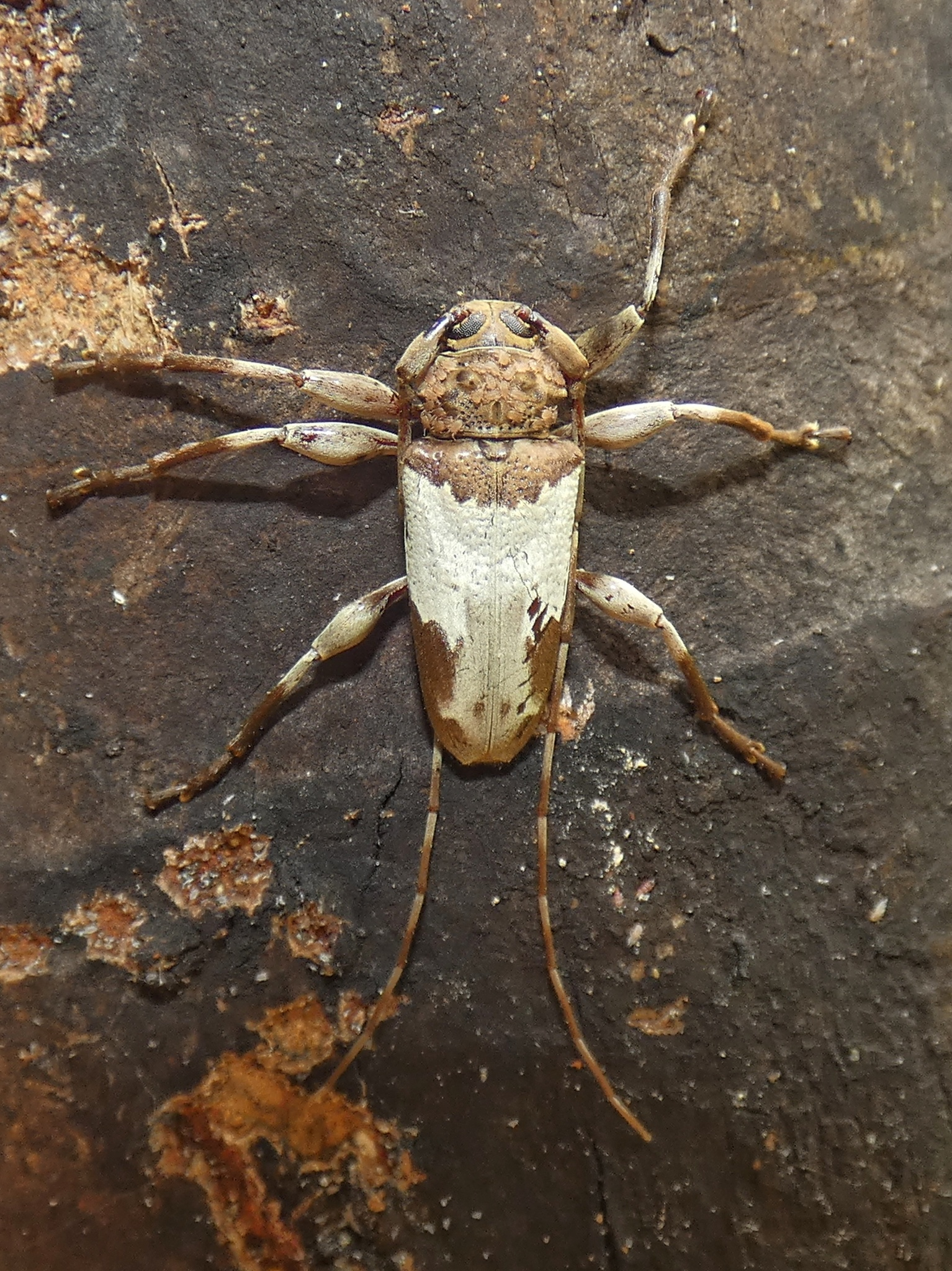
Oreodera canotogata, Panamá

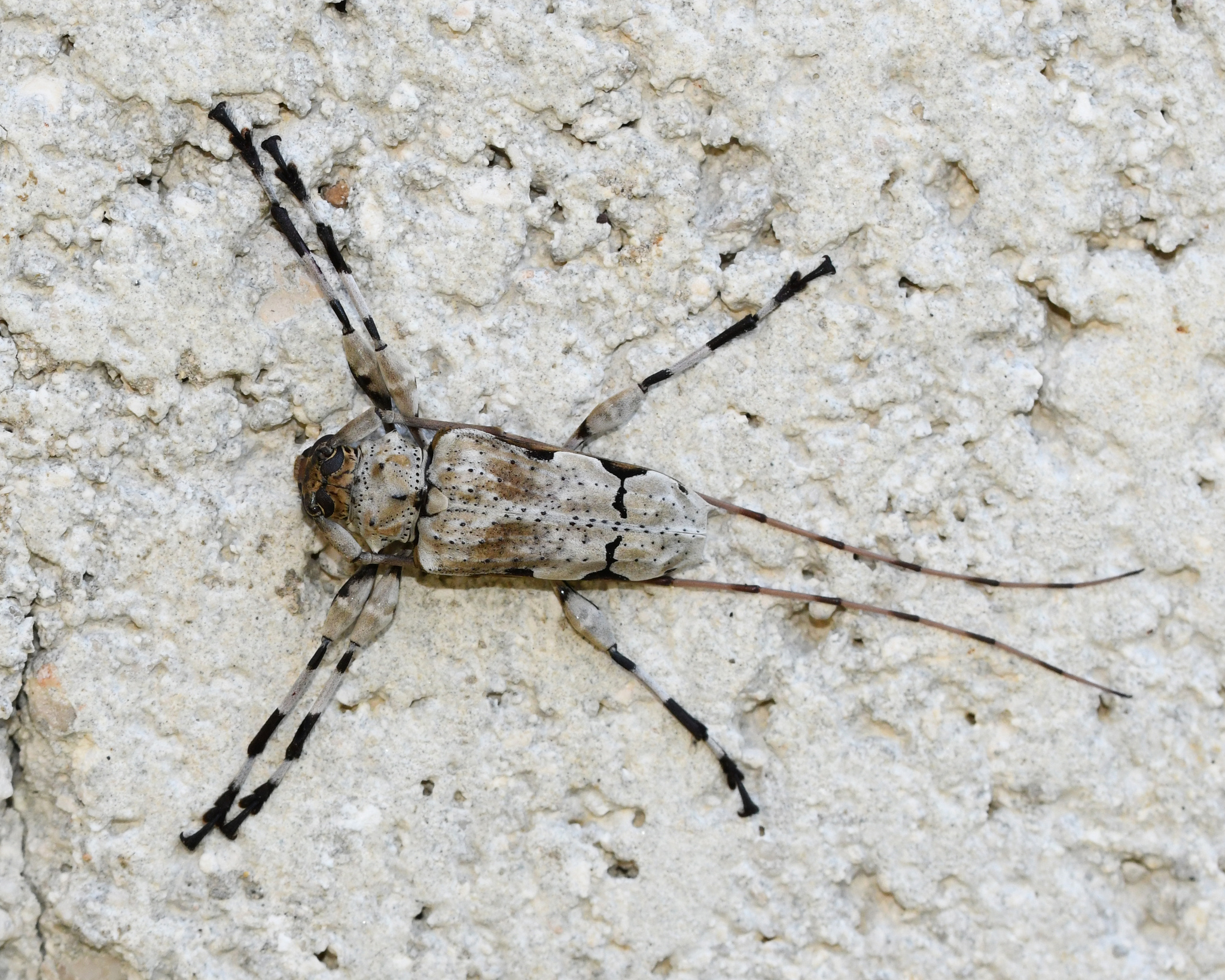
Oreodera glauca, Dominican Republic

Oreodera is a genus of long-horned beetles in the family Cerambycidae. Oreodera is in the subfamily Lamiinae, the flat-faced longhorns. There are more than 100 described species in Oreodera, found in Central and South America.

== Species ==
These 119 species belong to the genus Oreodera:

- Oreodera achatina Erichson, 1847 (Suriname, Peru, Brazil)
- Oreodera adornata Martins & Galileo, 2005 (Colombia)
- Oreodera advena Martins & Galileo, 2005 (Colombia, Ecuador)
- Oreodera aerumnosa Erichson, 1847 (Neotropics)
- Oreodera aestiva Néouze & Tavakilian, 2010 (French Guiana, Suriname)
- Oreodera affinis Gahan, 1892 (Guatemala)
- Oreodera aglaia Monné & Fragoso, 1988 (Ecuador)
- Oreodera albata Villiers, 1971 (Peru, Panama, French Guiana, Brazil)
- Oreodera albicans Monné & Fragoso, 1988 (Brazil, French Guiana)
- Oreodera albilatera Martins & Monné, 1993 (Panama, Ecuador)
- Oreodera aliciae McCarty, 2005 (Panama, Costa Rica)
- Oreodera amabilis Monné & Fragoso, 1988 (Brazil)
- Oreodera antonkozlovi Santos-Silva & Botero, 2016
- Oreodera basicretata Néouze & Tavakilian, 2010 (French Guiana)
- Oreodera basipenicillata Tippmann, 1960 (Bolivia, Ecuador, French Guiana)
- Oreodera basiradiata Tippmann, 1960 (Brazil, French Guiana)
- Oreodera beneluzi Néouze & Tavakilian, 2010 (French Guiana)
- Oreodera bituberculata Bates, 1861 (Neotropics)
- Oreodera boliviana Tippmann, 1960 (Bolivia, Brazil, Peru)
- Oreodera boucheri Néouze & Tavakilian, 2010 (French Guiana)
- Oreodera brailovskyi Chemsak & Noguera, 1993 (Mexico)
- Oreodera c-album Bates, 1872 (Costa Rica, Nicaragua, Venezuela)
- Oreodera candida Marinoni & Martins, 1978 (Brazil)
- Oreodera cangaceira Nascimento, Rodrigues & Bravo, 2021
- Oreodera canotogata Bates, 1872 (Panama, Costa Rica, Nicaragua)
- Oreodera casariae Martins, Santos-Silva & Galileo, 2015
- Oreodera charisoma Lane, 1955 (Brazil)
- Oreodera chemsaki McCarty, 2001 (Guatemala, Mexico)
- Oreodera cinerea Audinet-Serville, 1835 (Venezuela, Brazil)
- Oreodera clarkei Galileo, Santos-Silva & Wappes, 2017
- Oreodera cocoensis (Linsley & Chemsak, 1966) (Isla del Coco (Costa Rica))
- Oreodera copei McCarty, 2001 (Mexico)
- Oreodera corticina Thomson, 1865 (Neotropics)
- Oreodera costaricensis Thomson, 1865 (Neotropics)
- Oreodera cretata Bates, 1861 (Neotropics)
- Oreodera cretifera Pascoe, 1859 (Brazil)
- Oreodera crinita Monné & Fragoso, 1988 (Ecuador, French Guiana, Peru)
- Oreodera curiosa Galileo & Martins, 2007 (Brazil)
- Oreodera curvata Martins & Monné, 1993 (Brazil, Colombia, French Guiana, Suriname)
- Oreodera dalensi Tavakilian & Néouze, 2011 (French Guiana)
- Oreodera durantoni Néouze & Tavakilian, 2010 (French Guiana)
- Oreodera exigua Monné & Fragoso, 1988 (Brazil)
- Oreodera fasciculosa Thomson, 1865 (Neotropics)
- Oreodera feuilleti Néouze & Tavakilian, 2010 (French Guiana)
- Oreodera flavopunctata Fuchs, 1958 (Brazil, French Guiana)
- Oreodera fluctuosa Bates, 1861 (Neotropics)
- Oreodera forsteri Tippmann, 1960 (Peru, Bolivia)
- Oreodera glauca (Linné, 1758) (Neotropics)
- Oreodera goudotii (White, 1855) (Colombia)
- Oreodera granulifera Bates, 1872 (Neotropics)
- Oreodera granulipennis Zajciw, 1963 (Venezuela)
- Oreodera graphiptera Bates, 1885 (Costa Rica, Honduras, Nicaragua, Panama)
- Oreodera griseozonata Bates, 1861 (Brazil, French Guiana)
- Oreodera hassenteufeli (Fuchs, 1958) (Bolivia)
- Oreodera hoffmanni (Thomson, 1860) (Brazil, Paraguay)
- Oreodera hovorei Néouze & Tavakilian, 2010 (French Guiana)
- Oreodera howdeni Monné & Fragoso, 1988 (Neotropics)
- Oreodera inscripta Bates, 1872 (Costa Rica, Honduras, Nicaragua, Panama)
- Oreodera jacquieri Thomson, 1865 (Brazil, French Guiana, Venezuela)
- Oreodera kawasae Santos-Silva, Van Roie & Jocqué, 2021
- Oreodera kawensis Néouze & Tavakilian, 2010 (French Guiana)
- Oreodera lanei Monné & Fragoso, 1988 (Peru, Bolivia, Brazil)
- Oreodera larrei Néouze & Tavakilian, 2010 (French Guiana)
- Oreodera lateralis (Olivier, 1800) (Puerto Rico, Cuba, Panama)
- Oreodera leucostigma Monné & Fragoso, 1988 (Brazil)
- Oreodera lezamai Hovore, 1990 (Costa Rica)
- Oreodera luteogrisea Néouze & Tavakilian, 2010 (French Guiana)
- Oreodera macropoda Marinoni & Martins, 1978 (Brazil, Ecuador, Peru)
- Oreodera mageia Martins, Galileo & Tavakilian, 2008 (French Guiana)
- Oreodera magnifica Martins & Monné, 1993 (Brazil)
- Oreodera magnoi Monné & Fragoso, 1988 (Brazil, Ecuador)
- Oreodera marinonii Monné & Fragoso, 1988 (Brazil)
- Oreodera melzeri Monné & Fragoso, 1988 (Brazil, Colombia, Ecuador, French Guiana, Peru)
- Oreodera mimetica Lane, 1970 (Costa Rica, Panama)
- Oreodera minima Galileo & Martins, 1999 (South America)
- Oreodera mocoiatira Galileo & Martins, 1998 (Ecuador)
- Oreodera modesta Monné & Fragoso, 1988 (Brazil)
- Oreodera morvanae Néouze & Tavakilian, 2010 (French Guiana)
- Oreodera neglecta Melzer, 1932 (Brazil, Ecuador, French Guiana, Suriname)
- Oreodera nivea Martins & Galileo, 2005 (Colombia)
- Oreodera noguerai McCarty, 2001 (Mexico)
- Oreodera occulta Monné & Fragoso, 1988 (Argentina, Bolivia, Brazil)
- Oreodera ohausi Melzer, 1930 (Argentina, Bolivia, Brazil)
- Oreodera olivaceotincta Tippmann, 1953 (Bolivia, Brazil, Ecuador, Peru)
- Oreodera olivosimplex Néouze & Tavakilian, 2010 (French Guiana, Suriname)
- Oreodera omissa Melzer, 1932 (Brazil)
- Oreodera paulista Tippmann, 1953 (Paraguay, French Guiana, Brazil, Bolivia)
- Oreodera pergeri Wappes & Santos-Silva, 2019
- Oreodera podagrica Néouze & Tavakilian, 2010 (French Guiana)
- Oreodera purpurascens Bates, 1880 (Costa Rica, Guatemala, Honduras)
- Oreodera pustulosa Monné & Fragoso, 1988 (Brazil, French Guiana)
- Oreodera quinquetuberculata (Drapiez, 1820) (Argentina, Bolivia, Brazil, Paraguay)
- Oreodera rhytisma Monné & Fragoso, 1988 (Ecuador)
- Oreodera roppai Monné & Fragoso, 1988 (Brazil, French Guiana)
- Oreodera rufofasciata Bates, 1861 (Brazil, Ecuador, Peru)
- Oreodera seabrai Monné & Fragoso, 1988 (Brazil)
- Oreodera semialba Bates, 1874 (Costa Rica, Nicaragua, Panama)
- Oreodera semiporosa Tippmann, 1960 (Bolivia)
- Oreodera sensibilis Galileo & Martins, 2007 (Brazil)
- Oreodera seraisorum Néouze & Tavakilian, 2010 (French Guiana)
- Oreodera sericata Bates, 1861 (Ecuador, Brazil)
- Oreodera sexplagiata Melzer, 1931 (Brazil)
- Oreodera simplex Bates, 1861 (Bolivia, Brazil, Ecuador, French Guiana)
- Oreodera sororcula Martins & Monné, 1993 (Venezuela, French Guiana, Guyana, Suriname)
- Oreodera stictica Monné & Fragoso, 1988 (Brazil)
- Oreodera tenebrosa Thomson, 1865 (Brazil)
- Oreodera tijuca Marinoni & Martins, 1978 (Brazil)
- Oreodera triangularis Galileo & Martins, 2007 (Brazil)
- Oreodera trinitensis Néouze & Tavakilian, 2010 (French Guiana)
- Oreodera tuberculata Thomson, 1865 (Bolivia, Colombia, Ecuador, Peru)
- Oreodera tuberculifera Galileo & Martins, 2007 (Brazil)
- Oreodera tuberosa Monné & Fragoso, 1988 (Brazil, French Guiana)
- Oreodera turnbowi McCarty, 2001 (Mexico)
- Oreodera undulata Bates, 1861 (Ecuador, French Guiana, Suriname, Brazil)
- Oreodera veronicae Néouze & Tavakilian, 2010 (French Guiana)
- Oreodera verrucosa Bates, 1872 (Costa Rica, Nicaragua, Panama)
- Oreodera vulgata Monné & Fragoso, 1988 (Brazil, Paraguay)
- Oreodera wappesi McCarty, 2001 (Honduras, Mexico)
- Oreodera zikani Melzer, 1930 (Brazil)
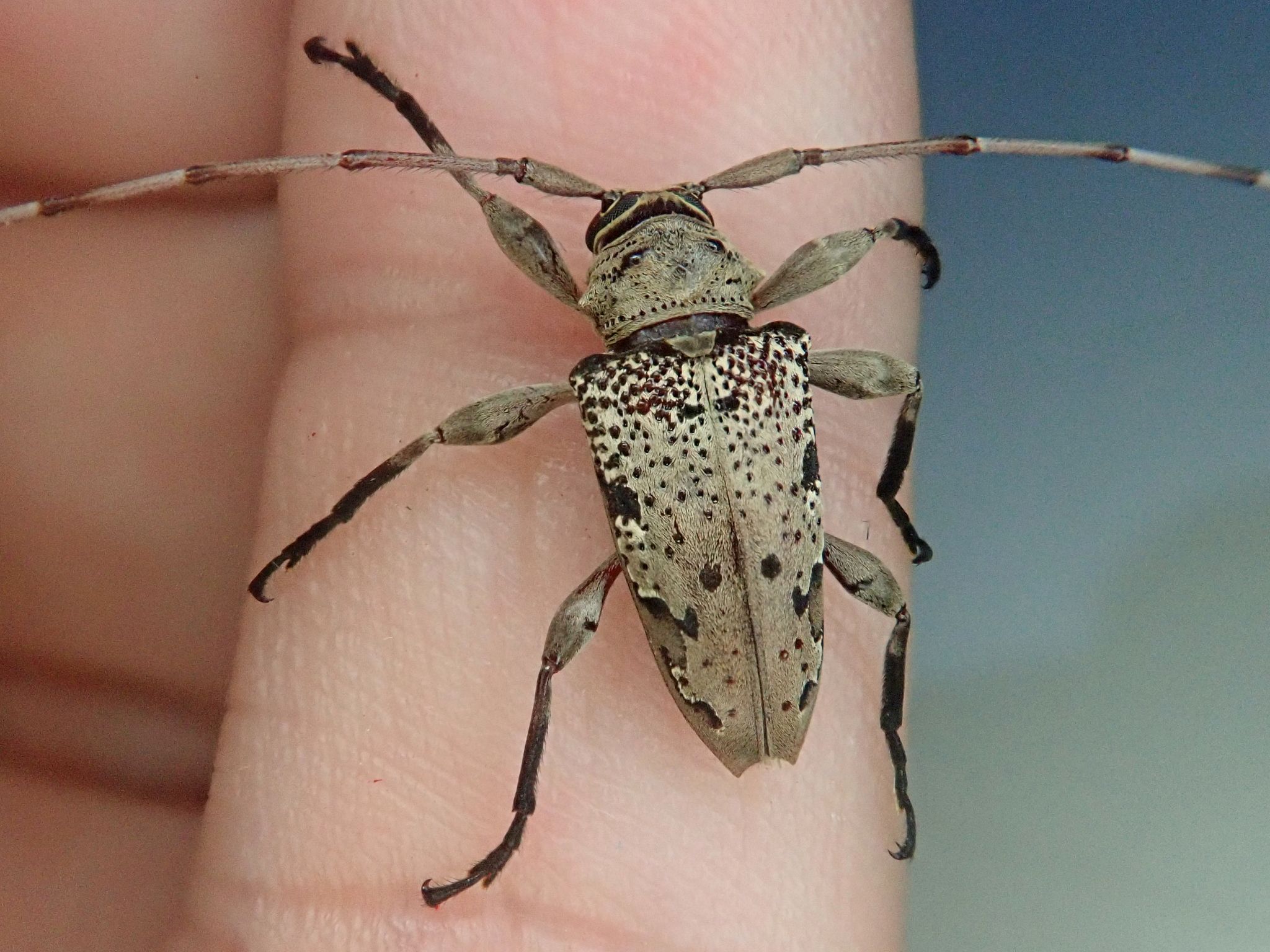
Oreodera aerumnosa, Brazil

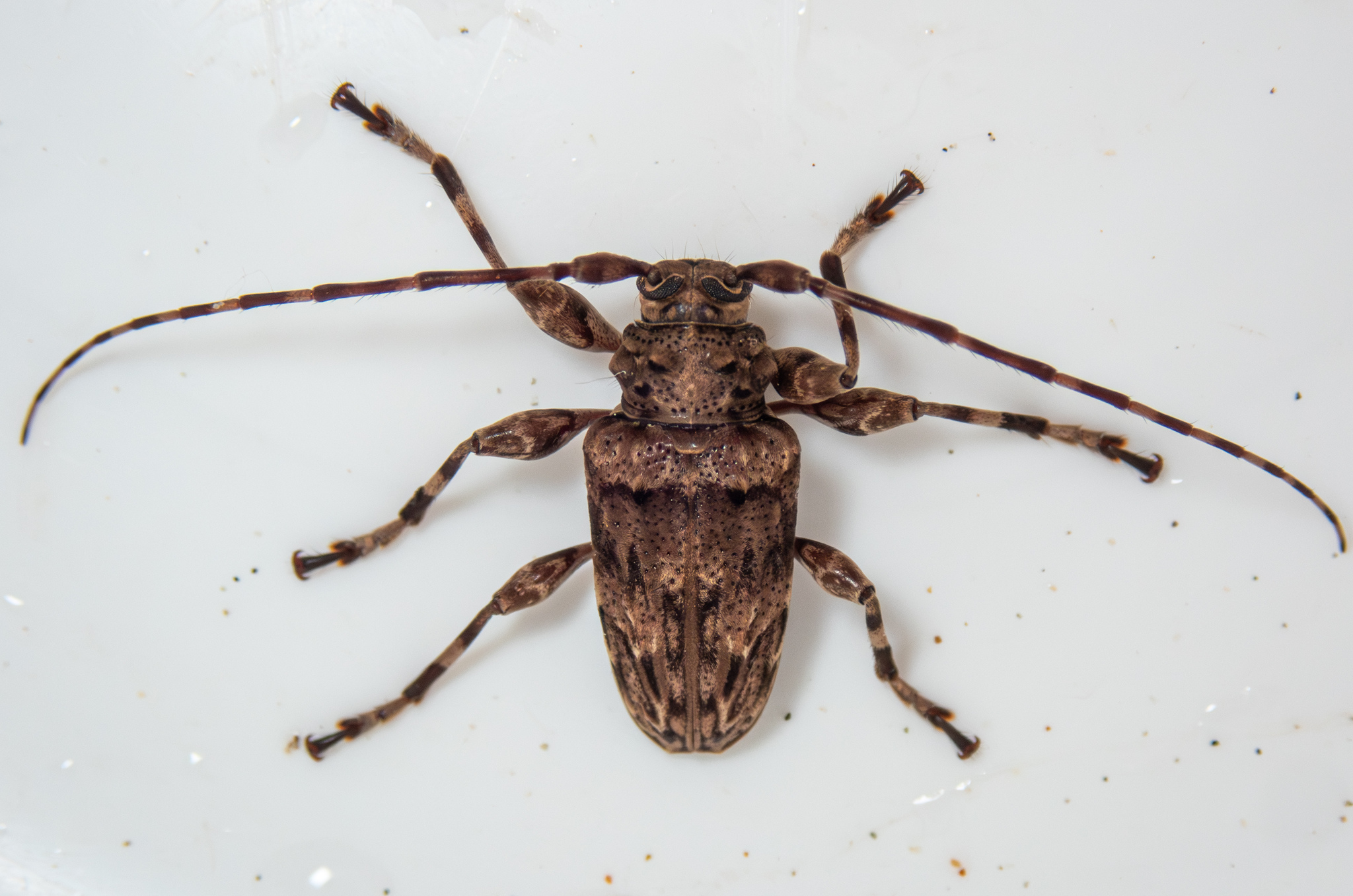
Oreodera graphiptera, Costa Rica

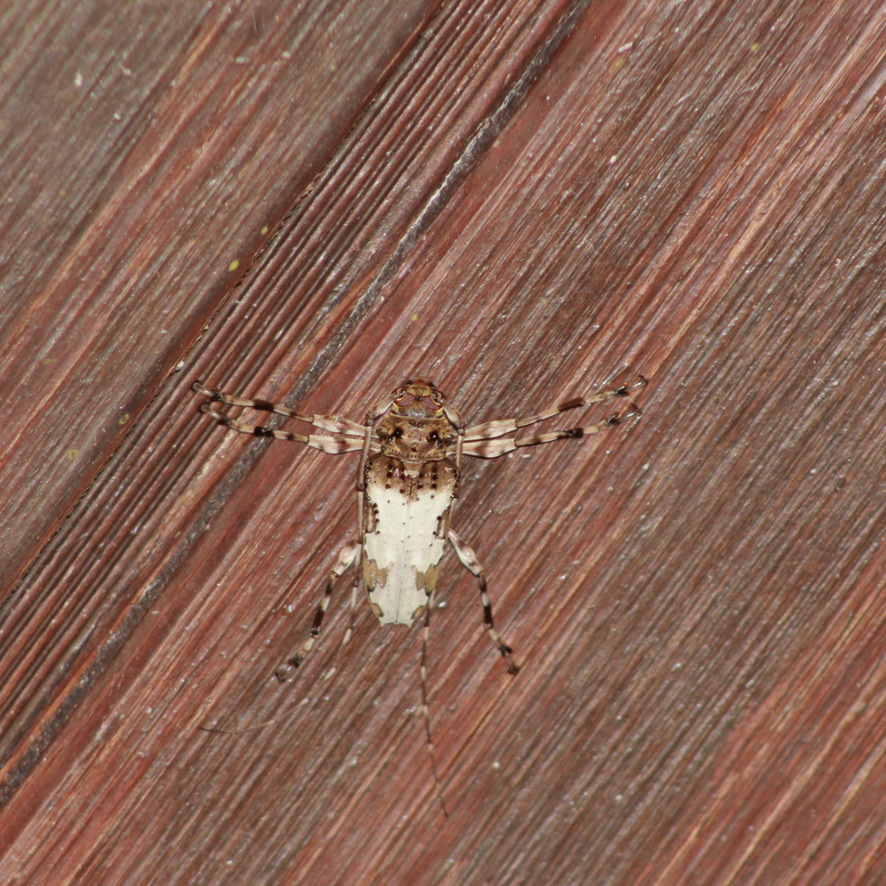
Oreodera jacquieri, Trinidad and Tobago

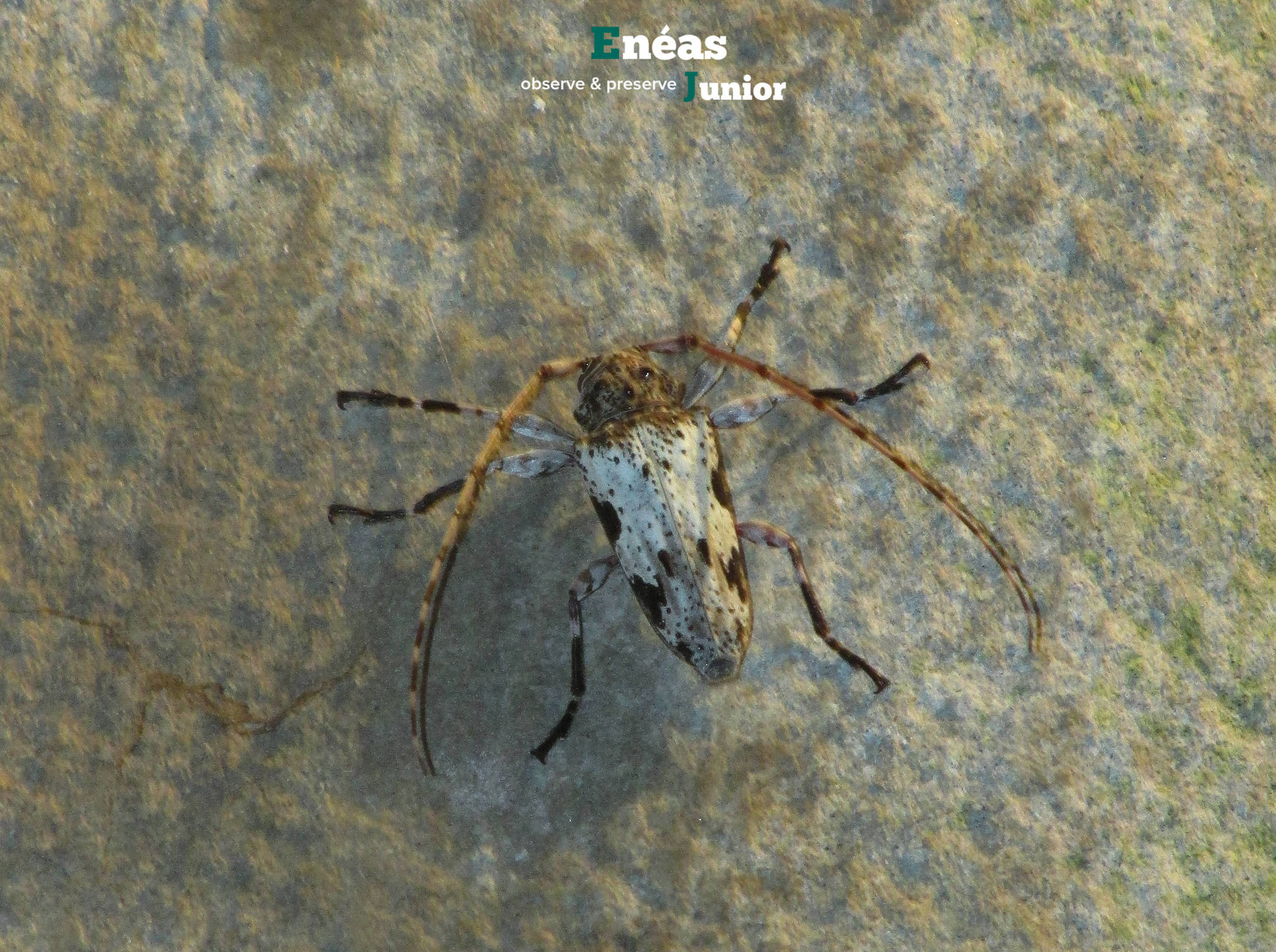
Oreodera quinquetuberculata, Brazil
