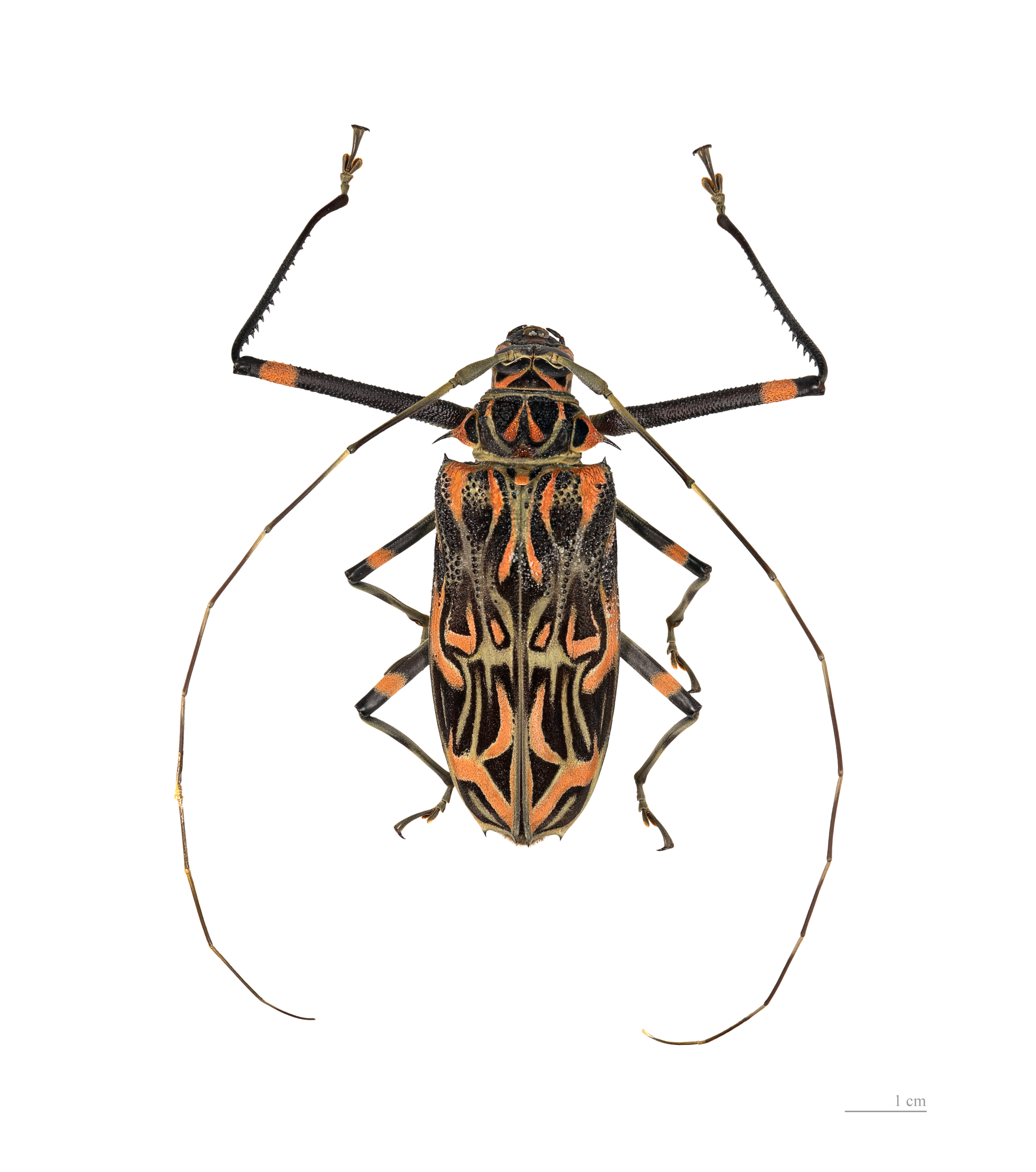
- Acrocinus longimanus

Scientific classification
- Domain: Eukaryota
- Kingdom: Animalia
- Phylum: Arthropoda
- Class: Insecta
- Order: Coleoptera
- Suborder: Polyphaga
- Infraorder: Cucujiformia
- Family: Cerambycidae
- Subfamily: Lamiinae
- Tribe: Acrocinini

Type genus
- Acrocinus

= Acrocinini =

Tribe of beetles

Acrocinini is a tribe of longhorn beetles of the subfamily Lamiinae.

== Taxonomy ==
- Acrocinus Illiger, 1806
- Macropophora Thomson, 1864
- Oreodera Audinet-Serville, 1835
