= Orthomecyna =

Scientific classification
- Domain: Eukaryota
- Kingdom: Animalia
- Phylum: Arthropoda
- Class: Insecta
- Order: Lepidoptera
- Family: Crambidae
- Subfamily: Crambinae
- Tribe: incertae sedis
- Genus: Orthomecyna; Butler, 1883

Genus of moths

Orthomecyna is a genus of moths of the family Crambidae. All species are endemic to Hawaii.

== Species ==
- Orthomecyna albicaudata Butler, 1883
- Orthomecyna alloptila Meyrick, 1899
- Orthomecyna amphilyca Meyrick, 1899
- Orthomecyna aphanopis Meyrick, 1888
- Orthomecyna chrysophanes Meyrick, 1899
- Orthomecyna crossias Meyrick, 1899
- Orthomecyna epicausta Meyrick, 1899
- Orthomecyna exigua Butler, 1879
  - Orthomecyna exigua cupreipennis
  - Orthomecyna exigua exigua
- Orthomecyna heterodryas Meyrick, 1899
- Orthomecyna mesochasma Meyrick, 1899
- Orthomecyna metalycia Meyrick, 1899
- Orthomecyna phaeophanes Meyrick, 1899
- Orthomecyna picrodes Meyrick, 1899
