= Orthomecyna exigua =

Scientific classification
- Domain: Eukaryota
- Kingdom: Animalia
- Phylum: Arthropoda
- Class: Insecta
- Order: Lepidoptera
- Family: Crambidae
- Subfamily: Crambinae
- Tribe: incertae sedis
- Genus: Orthomecyna
- Species: O. exigua

Binomial name
- Orthomecyna exigua Butler, 1879

Synonyms
- Mecyna exigua Butler, 1879; Orthomecyna exigua var. cupreipennis Butler, 1883; Orthomecyna cupreipennis

Species of moth

Orthomecyna exigua is a moth of the family Crambidae. It is endemic to the Hawaiian islands of Molokai, Maui, Lanai and Hawaii.

== Subspecies ==
- Orthomecyna exigua exigua (Molokai, Maui, Lanai, Hawaii)
- Orthomecyna exigua cupreipennis Butler, 1883 (Lanai)
