= Orthomecyna albicaudata =

Scientific classification
- Domain: Eukaryota
- Kingdom: Animalia
- Phylum: Arthropoda
- Class: Insecta
- Order: Lepidoptera
- Family: Crambidae
- Subfamily: Crambinae
- Tribe: incertae sedis
- Genus: Orthomecyna
- Species: O. albicaudata

Binomial name
- Orthomecyna albicaudata Butler, 1883

Species of moth

Orthomecyna albicaudata is a moth of the family Crambidae described by Arthur Gardiner Butler in 1883. It is endemic to the Hawaiian island of Lanai.
