= Orthomecyna phaeophanes =

Scientific classification
- Kingdom: Animalia
- Phylum: Arthropoda
- Class: Insecta
- Order: Lepidoptera
- Family: Crambidae
- Subfamily: Crambinae
- Tribe: incertae sedis
- Genus: Orthomecyna
- Species: O. phaeophanes

Binomial name
- Orthomecyna phaeophanes Meyrick, 1899

Species of moth

Orthomecyna phaeophanes is a moth of the family Crambidae. It is endemic to the Hawaiian islands of Kauai, Oahu, Molokai and Maui.
