= Orthomecyna crossias =

Scientific classification
- Domain: Eukaryota
- Kingdom: Animalia
- Phylum: Arthropoda
- Class: Insecta
- Order: Lepidoptera
- Family: Crambidae
- Subfamily: Crambinae
- Tribe: incertae sedis
- Genus: Orthomecyna
- Species: O. crossias

Binomial name
- Orthomecyna crossias Meyrick, 1899

Species of moth

Orthomecyna crossias is a moth of the family Crambidae. It is endemic to the Hawaiian island of Oahu.
