= Orthomecyna aphanopis =

Scientific classification
- Kingdom: Animalia
- Phylum: Arthropoda
- Class: Insecta
- Order: Lepidoptera
- Family: Crambidae
- Subfamily: Crambinae
- Tribe: incertae sedis
- Genus: Orthomecyna
- Species: O. aphanopis

Binomial name
- Orthomecyna aphanopis Meyrick, 1888

Species of moth

Orthomecyna aphanopis is a moth of the family Crambidae. It is endemic to the Hawaiian island of Oahu.

It is the smallest species of the genus Orthomecyna.
