= Outline of the Falkland Islands =

Overview of and topical guide to the Falkland Islands

The Flag of the Falkland Islands

The Coat of arms of the Falkland Islands

The location of the Falkland Islands

An enlargeable relief map of the Falkland Islands

The following outline is provided as an overview of and topical guide to the Falkland Islands:

The Falkland Islands (Spanish: Islas Malvinas) are an archipelago located in the South Atlantic Ocean on the Patagonian Shelf. The principal islands are about 310 miles (500 kilometres) east of the Patagonian coast at a latitude of about 52°S. The archipelago which has an area of 4,700 square miles (12,173 square kilometres) comprises East Falkland, West Falkland and 776 smaller islands. The islands, a British Overseas Territory, enjoy a large degree of internal self-government with the United Kingdom guaranteeing good government and taking responsibility for their defence and foreign affairs. The capital is Stanley on East Falkland.

Controversy exists over the Falklands' original discovery and subsequent colonisation by Europeans. At various times there have been French, British, Spanish, and Argentine settlements. Britain re-established its rule in 1833, though the islands continue to be claimed by Argentina. In 1982, following Argentina's invasion of the islands, the two-month-long undeclared Falklands War between both countries resulted in the surrender of all Argentine forces and the return of the islands to British administration.

The population, estimated at 2,841, primarily consists of native Falkland Islanders, the vast majority being of British descent. Other ethnicities include French, Gibraltarian, and Scandinavian. Immigration from the United Kingdom, Saint Helena, and Chile has reversed a former population decline. The predominant and official language is English. Under the British Nationality Act of 1983, Falkland Islanders are legally British citizens.

The islands lie on the boundary of the Subarctic maritime climate and Temperate maritime climate zones with both major islands having mountain ranges reaching to 2,300 feet (700 m). The islands are home to large bird populations, although many no longer breed on the main islands because of the effects of introduced species. Major economic activities include fishing, tourism, sheep farming with an emphasis on high-quality wool exports, and oil exploration. Oil exploration, licensed by the Falkland Islands Government, remains controversial as a result of maritime disputes with Argentina.

== General reference ==
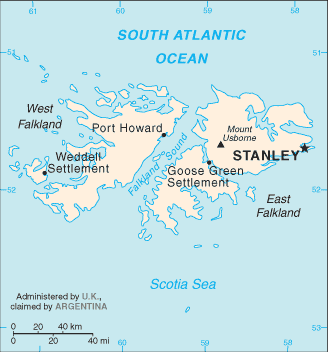
An enlargeable basic map of the Falkland Islands

- Pronunciation: /ˈfɔː(l)klənd ˈfɒlk-/
- Common English country names: The Falkland Islands, the Falklands
- Official English country name: The Falkland Islands
- Common endonym(s):
- Official endonym(s):
- Adjectival(s): Falkland Island
- Demonym(s): Falkland Islander, Falklander
- Etymology: Name of the Falkland Islands
- ISO country codes: FK, FLK, 238
- ISO region codes: See ISO 3166-2:FK
- Internet country code top-level domain: .fk

== Geography of the Falkland Islands ==
An enlargeable topographic map of the Falkland Islands

Geography of the Falkland Islands

- The Falkland Islands are: a British overseas territory and archipelago consisting of East Falkland, West Falkland, and 776 smaller islands
- Location:
  - Southern Hemisphere and Western Hemisphere
  - Atlantic Ocean
    - South Atlantic, 500 kilometres (310 mi) east of Argentina but 400 kilometres (250 mi) north east of the tip of Tierra del Fuego.
  - Time zone: UTC-4, September–April UTC-3
  - Extreme points of the Falkland Islands
    - High: Mount Usborne 705 m (2,313 ft)
    - Low: South Atlantic Ocean 0 m
  - Land boundaries: none
  - Coastline: 1,288 km
- Population of the Falkland Islands:
- Area of the Falkland Islands:
- Atlas of the Falkland Islands

=== Environment of the Falkland Islands ===
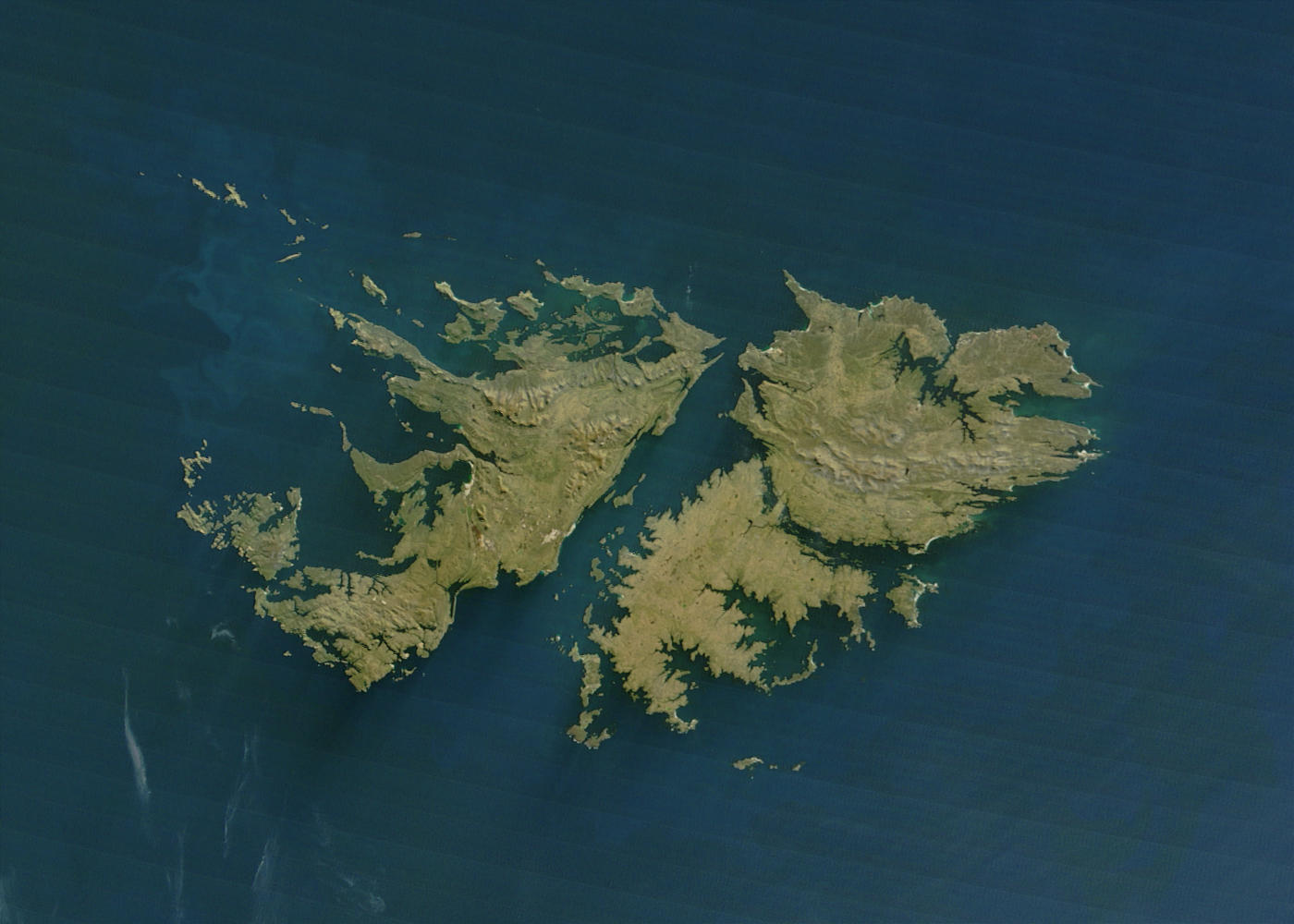
An enlargeable satellite image of the Falkland Islands

- Climate of the Falkland Islands
- Geology of the Falkland Islands
- Wildlife of the Falkland Islands
  - Fauna of the Falkland Islands
    - Birds of the Falkland Islands
    - Mammals of the Falkland Islands

==== Natural geographic features of the Falkland Islands ====
- Islands of the Falkland Islands
- Mountains of the Falkland Islands
- Rivers of the Falkland Islands
- Valleys of the Falkland Islands
- World Heritage Sites in the Falkland Islands: None
- Patagonian Shelf
- Burdwood Bank

=== Regions of the Falkland Islands ===
Regions of the Falkland Islands

==== Ecoregions of the Falkland Islands ====
List of ecoregions in the Falkland Islands

==== Administrative divisions of the Falkland Islands ====
===== Municipalities of the Falkland Islands =====
- Capital of the Falkland Islands: Stanley
- Cities of the Falkland Islands

=== Demography of the Falkland Islands ===
Demographics of the Falkland Islands

== Government and politics of the Falkland Islands ==
Politics of the Falkland Islands

- Form of government: parliamentary representative democratic dependency
- Capital of the Falkland Islands: Stanley
- Elections in the Falkland Islands
  - 1949 Falkland Islands general election
  - 1952 Falkland Islands general election
  - 1956 Falkland Islands general election
  - 1960 Falkland Islands general election
  - 1964 Falkland Islands general election
  - 1968 Falkland Islands general election
  - 1971 Falkland Islands general election
  - 1976 Falkland Islands general election
  - 1977 Falkland Islands general election
  - 1981 Falkland Islands general election
  - 1985 Falkland Islands general election
  - 1989 Falkland Islands general election
  - 1993 Falkland Islands general election
  - 1997 Falkland Islands general election
  - 2001 Falkland Islands general election
  - 2005 Falkland Islands general election
  - 2009 Falkland Islands general election
  - 2013 Falkland Islands general election
  - 2017 Falkland Islands general election
  - 2021 Falkland Islands general election
- Referendums in the Falkland Islands
  - 1986 Falkland Islands status referendum
  - 2001 Falkland Islands electoral system referendum
  - 2011 Falkland Islands electoral system referendum
  - 2013 Falkland Islands sovereignty referendum
  - 2020 Falkland Islands electoral system referendum
- List of Falkland Islands by-elections
- Political parties in the Falkland Islands

=== Branches of the government of the Falkland Islands ===
Government of the Falkland Islands

==== Executive branch of the government of the Falkland Islands ====
- Head of state: Monarch of the United Kingdom, Charles III
  - Monarch's representative: Governor of the Falkland Islands, Colin Martin-Reynolds
- Head of government: Chief Executive of the Falkland Islands, Andrea Clausen
- Cabinet: Executive Council of the Falkland Islands
  - 3 members elected by the Legislative Assembly
  - 2 ex officio members
    - the Chief Executive
    - the Director of Finance
  - the Governor

==== Legislative branch of the government of the Falkland Islands ====
- Legislative Assembly of the Falkland Islands (unicameral)
  - Speaker: Keith Biles

==== Judicial branch of the government of the Falkland Islands ====
Court system of the Falkland Islands

- Privy Council of the United Kingdom
  - Falkland Islands Court of Appeal
    - Supreme Court of the Falkland Islands
      - Magistrate's Court of the Falkland Islands
        - Summary Court of the Falkland Islands

=== Foreign relations of the Falkland Islands ===
Foreign relations of the Falkland Islands

- None - though self-governing, the Falkland Islands are an overseas territory of the United Kingdom, and therefore all foreign relations in regards to it are conducted by the UK. See also Sovereignty of the Falkland Islands.
  - Diplomatic missions in the Falkland Islands: none
  - Diplomatic missions of the Falkland Islands: none

==== International organization membership ====
The government of the Falkland Islands is a member of:

- Universal Postal Union (UPU)

=== Law and order in the Falkland Islands ===
Law of the Falkland Islands

- Constitution of the Falkland Islands
- Crime in the Falkland Islands
- Human rights in the Falkland Islands
  - LGBT rights in the Falkland Islands
- Law enforcement in the Falkland Islands

=== Military of the Falkland Islands ===
Military of the Falkland Islands

- Command
  - Commander-in-chief:
- Forces
  - Army of the Falkland Islands
  - Navy of the Falkland Islands
  - Air Force of the Falkland Islands
- Military history of the Falkland Islands
- Military ranks of the Falkland Islands

=== Local government in the Falkland Islands ===
Local government in the Falkland Islands

== History of the Falkland Islands ==
History of the Falkland Islands

- Timeline of the history of the Falkland Islands
- Current events of the Falkland Islands
- Falklands War
- Military history of the Falkland Islands

== Culture of the Falkland Islands ==
Culture of the Falkland Islands

- Architecture of the Falkland Islands
- Humour in the Falkland Islands
- Languages of the Falkland Islands
- National symbols of the Falkland Islands
  - Coat of arms of the Falkland Islands
  - Flag of the Falkland Islands
  - National anthem of the Falkland Islands
- People of the Falkland Islands
- Public holidays in the Falkland Islands
- Religion in the Falkland Islands
  - Sikhism in the Falkland Islands
- World Heritage Sites in the Falkland Islands: None

=== Art in the Falkland Islands ===
- Music of the Falkland Islands

=== Sports in the Falkland Islands ===
Sports in the Falkland Islands

- Football in the Falkland Islands

== Economy and infrastructure of the Falkland Islands ==
Economy of the Falkland Islands

- Economic rank, by nominal GDP (2007): 223rd (two hundred and twenty third)
- Falkland Islands Development Corporation
- Communications in the Falkland Islands
  - Internet in the Falkland Islands
- Companies of the Falkland Islands
- Currency of the Falkland Islands: Pound
  - ISO 4217: FKP
- Tourism in the Falkland Islands
- Transport in the Falkland Islands
  - Airports in the Falkland Islands
  - Rail transport in the Falkland Islands

== Education in the Falkland Islands ==
Education in the Falkland Islands

== See also ==
Falkland Islands

- Index of Falkland Islands-related articles
- List of Falkland Islands-related topics
- List of international rankings
- Outline of geography
- Outline of South America
- Outline of the United Kingdom
