= List of Falkland Islands referendums =

Following is a list of referendums held in the Falkland Islands:

- 1986 Falkland Islands status referendum – 96.45% for continued British sovereignty
- 2001 Falkland Islands electoral system referendum – 56.65% no to a single constituency for the whole of the Islands
- 2011 Falkland Islands electoral system referendum – 58.78% no to a single constituency
- 2013 Falkland Islands sovereignty referendum – 99.80% yes to remain an Overseas Territory of the United Kingdom
- 2020 Falkland Islands electoral system referendum – 50.67% yes to a single constituency, but fails to reach required two-thirds majority in both constituencies Stanley and Camp
