= List of country outlines =

This is a list of outlines of present-day nations, states, and dependencies. Countries are listed in bold under their respective pages, whereas territories and dependencies are not. Disputed and unrecognized countries are italicized.

== A ==
- Islamic Emirate of Afghanistan **Outline of Afghanistan** – Islamic Emirate of Afghanistan
- Albania **Outline of Albania** – Republic of Albania
- Algeria **Outline of Algeria** – People's Democratic Republic of Algeria
- Andorra **Outline of Andorra** – Principality of Andorra
- Angola **Outline of Angola** – Republic of Angola
- Antigua and Barbuda **Outline of Antigua and Barbuda** – Antigua and Barbuda
- Argentina **Outline of Argentina** – Argentine Republic
- Armenia **Outline of Armenia** – Republic of Armenia
- Aruba **Outline of Aruba** – Aruba (Dutch crown dependency)
- Australia **Outline of Australia** – Commonwealth of Australia
- Austria **Outline of Austria** – Republic of Austria
- Azerbaijan **Outline of Azerbaijan** – Republic of Azerbaijan

== B ==
- Bahamas **Outline of the Bahamas** – Commonwealth of The Bahamas
- Bahrain **Outline of Bahrain** – Kingdom of Bahrain
- Bangladesh **Outline of Bangladesh** – People's Republic of Bangladesh
- Barbados **Outline of Barbados** – Barbados
- Belarus **Outline of Belarus** – Republic of Belarus
- Belgium **Outline of Belgium** – Kingdom of Belgium
- Belize **Outline of Belize** – Belize
- Benin **Outline of Benin** – Republic of Benin
- Bhutan **Outline of Bhutan** – Kingdom of Bhutan
- Bolivia **Outline of Bolivia** – Plurinational State of Bolivia
- Bosnia and Herzegovina **Outline of Bosnia and Herzegovina** – Bosnia and Herzegovina
- Botswana **Outline of Botswana** – Republic of Botswana
- Brazil **Outline of Brazil** – Federative Republic of Brazil
- Brunei **Outline of Brunei** – State of Brunei Darussalam
- Bulgaria **Outline of Bulgaria** – Republic of Bulgaria
- Burkina Faso **Outline of Burkina Faso** – Burkina Faso
- Burundi **Outline of Burundi** – Republic of Burundi

== C ==
- Cambodia **Outline of Cambodia** – Kingdom of Cambodia
- Cameroon **Outline of Cameroon** – Republic of Cameroon
- Canada **Outline of Canada** – Canada
- Cape Verde **Outline of Cape Verde** – Republic of Cape Verde
- Cayman Islands **Outline of the Cayman Islands** – Cayman Islands (UK overseas territory)
- Central African Republic **Outline of the Central African Republic** – Central African Republic
- Chad **Outline of Chad** – Republic of Chad
- Chile **Outline of Chile** – Republic of Chile
- China **Outline of China** – People's Republic of China
- Colombia **Outline of Colombia** – Republic of Colombia
- Comoros **Outline of Comoros** – Union of the Comoros
- Democratic Republic of the Congo **Outline of the Democratic Republic of the Congo** – Democratic Republic of the Congo
- Republic of the Congo **Outline of the Republic of the Congo** – Republic of the Congo
- Costa Rica **Outline of Costa Rica** – Republic of Costa Rica
- Côte d'Ivoire **Outline of Côte d'Ivoire** – Republic of Côte d'Ivoire
- Croatia **Outline of Croatia** – Republic of Croatia
- Cuba **Outline of Cuba** – Republic of Cuba
- Cyprus **Outline of Cyprus** – Republic of Cyprus
- Czech Republic **Outline of the Czech Republic** – Czech Republic

== D ==
- Denmark **Outline of Denmark** – Kingdom of Denmark
- Djibouti **Outline of Djibouti** – Republic of Djibouti
- Dominica **Outline of Dominica** – Commonwealth of Dominica
- Dominican Republic **Outline of the Dominican Republic** – Dominican Republic

== E ==
- East Timor **Outline of East Timor (Timor-Leste)** – Democratic Republic of Timor-Leste
- Ecuador **Outline of Ecuador** – Republic of Ecuador
- Egypt **Outline of Egypt** – Arab Republic of Egypt
- El Salvador **Outline of El Salvador** – Republic of El Salvador
- Equatorial Guinea **Outline of Equatorial Guinea** – Republic of Equatorial Guinea
- Eritrea **Outline of Eritrea** – State of Eritrea
- Estonia **Outline of Estonia** – Republic of Estonia
- Eswatini **Outline of Eswatini (Swaziland)** – Kingdom of Eswatini
- Ethiopia **Outline of Ethiopia** – Federal Democratic Republic of Ethiopia

== F ==
- Falkland Islands **Outline of the Falkland Islands** – Falkland Islands (British overseas territories)
- Faroe Islands **Outline of the Faroe Islands** – Faroe Islands (Self-governing country in the Kingdom of Denmark)
- Fiji **Outline of Fiji** – Republic of the Fiji Islands
- Finland **Outline of Finland** – Republic of Finland
- France **Outline of France** – French Republic
- French Guiana **Outline of French Guiana** – French Guiana (French overseas community)
- French Polynesia **Outline of French Polynesia** – French Polynesia (French overseas community)

== G ==
- Gabon **Outline of Gabon** – Gabonese Republic
- Gambia **Outline of the Gambia** – Republic of The Gambia
- See Outline of Palestine for Gaza Strip
- Georgia **Outline of Georgia** – Georgia
- Germany **Outline of Germany** – Federal Republic of Germany
- Ghana **Outline of Ghana** – Republic of Ghana
- Gibraltar **Outline of Gibraltar** – Gibraltar (UK overseas territory)
- Greece **Outline of Greece** – Hellenic Republic
- Greenland **Outline of Greenland** – Greenland (Self-governing country in the Kingdom of Denmark)
- Grenada **Outline of Grenada** – Grenada
- Guadeloupe **Outline of Guadeloupe** – Guadeloupe (French overseas community)
- Guam **Outline of Guam** – Territory of Guam (US overseas territory)
- Guatemala **Outline of Guatemala** – Republic of Guatemala
- Guinea **Outline of Guinea** – Republic of Guinea
- Guinea-Bissau **Outline of Guinea-Bissau** – Republic of Guinea-Bissau
- Guyana **Outline of Guyana** – Co-operative Republic of Guyana

== H ==
- Haiti **Outline of Haiti** – Republic of Haiti
- Honduras **Outline of Honduras** – Republic of Honduras
- Hong Kong **Outline of Hong Kong** – Hong Kong Special Administrative Region of the People's Republic of China (Area of special sovereignty)
- Hungary **Outline of Hungary** – Republic of Hungary

== I ==
- Iceland **Outline of Iceland** – Republic of Iceland
- India **Outline of India** – Republic of India
- Indonesia **Outline of Indonesia** – Republic of Indonesia
- Iran **Outline of Iran** – Islamic Republic of Iran
- Iraq **Outline of Iraq** – Republic of Iraq
- Ireland **Outline of the Republic of Ireland** – Republic of Ireland
- See Outline of the Falkland Islands for Islas Malvinas
- Isle of Man **Outline of the Isle of Man** – Isle of Man (British Crown dependency)
- Israel **Outline of Israel** – State of Israel
- Italy **Outline of Italy** – Italian Republic

== J ==
- Jamaica **Outline of Jamaica** – Jamaica
- Japan **Outline of Japan** – Japan
- Jersey **Outline of Jersey** – Jersey (British crown dependency)
- Jordan **Outline of Jordan** – Hashemite Kingdom of Jordan

== K ==
- Kazakhstan **Outline of Kazakhstan** – Republic of Kazakhstan
- Kenya **Outline of Kenya** – Republic of Kenya
- Kiribati **Outline of Kiribati** – Republic of Kiribati
- North Korea **Outline of North Korea** – Democratic People's Republic of Korea
- South Korea **Outline of South Korea (Republic of)** – Republic of Korea
- Kosovo **Outline of Kosovo** – Kosovo Republic
- Kuwait **Outline of Kuwait** – State of Kuwait
- Kyrgyzstan **Outline of Kyrgyzstan** – Kyrgyz Republic

== L ==
- Laos **Outline of Laos** – Lao People's Democratic Republic
- Latvia **Outline of Latvia** – Republic of Latvia
- Lebanon **Outline of Lebanon** – Republic of Lebanon
- Lesotho **Outline of Lesotho** – Kingdom of Lesotho
- Liberia **Outline of Liberia** – Republic of Liberia
- Libya **Outline of Libya** – State of Libya
- Liechtenstein **Outline of Liechtenstein** – Principality of Liechtenstein
- Lithuania **Outline of Lithuania** – Republic of Lithuania
- Luxembourg **Outline of Luxembourg** – Grand Duchy of Luxembourg

== M ==
- Madagascar **Outline of Madagascar** – Republic of Madagascar
- Malawi **Outline of Malawi** – Republic of Malawi
- Malaysia **Outline of Malaysia** – Malaysia
- Maldives **Outline of the Maldives** – Republic of Maldives
- Mali **Outline of Mali** – Republic of Mali
- Malta **Outline of Malta** – Republic of Malta
- Marshall Islands **Outline of the Marshall Islands** – Republic of the Marshall Islands
- Mauritania **Outline of Mauritania** – Islamic Republic of Mauritania
- Mauritius **Outline of Mauritius** – Republic of Mauritius
- Mayotte **Outline of Mayotte** – Mayotte (French overseas community)
- Mexico **Outline of Mexico** – United Mexican States
- FSM **Outline of the Federated States of Micronesia** – Federated States of Micronesia
- Moldova **Outline of Moldova** – Republic of Moldova
- Monaco **Outline of Monaco** – Principality of Monaco
- Mongolia **Outline of Mongolia** – Mongolia
- Montenegro **Outline of Montenegro** – Republic of Montenegro
- Montserrat **Outline of Montserrat** – Montserrat (UK overseas territory)
- Morocco **Outline of Morocco** – Kingdom of Morocco
- Mozambique **Outline of Mozambique** – Republic of Mozambique
- Myanmar **Outline of Myanmar** – Republic of the Union of Myanmar

== N ==
- Namibia **Outline of Namibia** – Republic of Namibia
- Nauru **Outline of Nauru** – Republic of Nauru
- Nepal **Outline of Nepal** – Federal Democratic Republic of Nepal
- Netherlands **Outline of the Netherlands** – Kingdom of the Netherlands
- Netherlands Antilles **Outline of the Netherlands Antilles** – Netherlands Antilles (Former self-governing country in the Kingdom of the Netherlands)
- New Caledonia **Outline of New Caledonia** – Territory of New Caledonia and Dependencies (French community sui generis)
- New Zealand **Outline of New Zealand** – New Zealand
- Nicaragua **Outline of Nicaragua** – Republic of Nicaragua
- Niger **Outline of Niger** – Republic of Niger
- Nigeria **Outline of Nigeria** – Federal Republic of Nigeria
- Niue **Outline of Niue** – Niue (Associated state of New Zealand)
- Northern Cyprus **Outline of Northern Cyprus** – Turkish Republic of Northern Cyprus
- Northern Mariana Islands **Outline of the Northern Mariana Islands** – Commonwealth of the Northern Mariana Islands (US overseas commonwealth)
- North Macedonia **Outline of North Macedonia** – North Macedonia
- Norway **Outline of Norway** – Kingdom of Norway

== O ==
- Oman **Outline of Oman** – Sultanate of Oman

== P ==
- Pakistan **Outline of Pakistan** – Islamic Republic of Pakistan
- Palau **Outline of Palau** – Republic of Palau
- Palestinian territories **Outline of Palestine** – State of Palestine
- Panama **Outline of Panama** – Republic of Panama
- Papua New Guinea **Outline of Papua New Guinea** – Independent State of Papua New Guinea
- Paraguay **Outline of Paraguay** – Republic of Paraguay
- Peru **Outline of Peru** – Republic of Peru
- Philippines **Outline of the Philippines** – Republic of the Philippines
- Pitcairn Islands **Outline of the Pitcairn Islands** – Pitcairn, Henderson, Ducie, and Oeno Islands (UK overseas territory)
- Poland **Outline of Poland** – Republic of Poland
- Portugal **Outline of Portugal** – Portuguese Republic
- Puerto Rico **Outline of Puerto Rico** – Commonwealth of Puerto Rico (US overseas commonwealth)

== Q ==
- Qatar **Outline of Qatar** – State of Qatar

== R ==
- Romania **Outline of Romania** – Romania
- Russia **Outline of Russia** – Russian Federation
- Rwanda **Outline of Rwanda** – Republic of Rwanda

== S ==
- Saint Kitts and Nevis **Outline of Saint Kitts and Nevis** – Federation of Saint Christopher and Nevis
- Saint Lucia **Outline of Saint Lucia** – Saint Lucia
- SPM **Outline of Saint-Pierre and Miquelon** – Saint Pierre and Miquelon (French overseas community)
- Saint Vincent and the Grenadines **Outline of Saint Vincent and the Grenadines** – Saint Vincent and the Grenadines
- Samoa **Outline of Samoa** – Independent State of Samoa
- San Marino **Outline of San Marino** – Most Serene Republic of San Marino
- São Tomé and Príncipe **Outline of São Tomé and Príncipe** – Democratic Republic of São Tomé and Príncipe
- Saudi Arabia **Outline of Saudi Arabia** – Kingdom of Saudi Arabia
- Senegal **Outline of Senegal** – Republic of Senegal
- Serbia **Outline of Serbia** – Republic of Serbia
- Seychelles **Outline of Seychelles** – Republic of Seychelles
- Sierra Leone **Outline of Sierra Leone** – Republic of Sierra Leone
- Singapore **Outline of Singapore** – Republic of Singapore
- Slovakia **Outline of Slovakia** – Slovak Republic
- Slovenia **Outline of Slovenia** – Republic of Slovenia
- Solomon Islands **Outline of the Solomon Islands** – Solomon Islands
- Somalia **Outline of Somalia** – Federal Republic of Somalia
- Somaliland **Outline of Somaliland** – Republic of Somaliland
- South Africa **Outline of South Africa** – Republic of South Africa
- South Ossetia **Outline of South Ossetia** – Republic of South Ossetia
- South Sudan **Outline of South Sudan** – Republic of South Sudan
- Spain **Outline of Spain** – Kingdom of Spain
- Sri Lanka **Outline of Sri Lanka** – Democratic Socialist Republic of Sri Lanka
- Sudan **Outline of Sudan** – Republic of the Sudan
- Suriname **Outline of Suriname** – Republic of Suriname
- Svalbard **Outline of Svalbard** – Svalbard (Territory of Norway)
- Sweden **Outline of Sweden** – Kingdom of Sweden
- Switzerland **Outline of Switzerland** – Swiss Confederation
- Syria **Outline of Syria** – Syrian Arab Republic

== T ==
- Taiwan **Outline of Taiwan** – Republic of China
- Tajikistan **Outline of Tajikistan** – Republic of Tajikistan
- Tanzania **Outline of Tanzania** – United Republic of Tanzania
- Thailand **Outline of Thailand** – Kingdom of Thailand
- Togo **Outline of Togo** – Togolese Republic
- Tokelau **Outline of Tokelau** – Tokelau (Territory of New Zealand)
- Tonga **Outline of Tonga** – Kingdom of Tonga
- Transnistria **Outline of Transnistria** – Pridnestrovian Moldavian Republic
- Trinidad and Tobago **Outline of Trinidad and Tobago** – Republic of Trinidad and Tobago
- Tunisia **Outline of Tunisia** – Tunisian Republic
- Turkey **Outline of Turkey** – Republic of Türkiye
- Turkmenistan **Outline of Turkmenistan** – Turkmenistan
- Turks and Caicos Islands **Outline of the Turks and Caicos Islands** – Turks and Caicos Islands (UK overseas territory)
- Tuvalu **Outline of Tuvalu** – Tuvalu

== U ==
- Uganda **Outline of Uganda** – Republic of Uganda
- Ukraine **Outline of Ukraine** – Ukraine
- United Arab Emirates **Outline of the United Arab Emirates** – United Arab Emirates
- United Kingdom **Outline of the United Kingdom** – United Kingdom of Great Britain and Northern Ireland
- United States **Outline of the United States** – United States of America
- Uruguay **Outline of Uruguay** – Oriental Republic of Uruguay
- Uzbekistan **Outline of Uzbekistan** – Republic of Uzbekistan

== V ==
- Vanuatu **Outline of Vanuatu** – Republic of Vanuatu
- Vatican City **Outline of Vatican City** - Vatican City State
- Venezuela **Outline of Venezuela** – Bolivarian Republic of Venezuela
- Vietnam **Outline of Vietnam** – Socialist Republic of Vietnam
- U.S. Virgin Islands **Outline of the Virgin Islands** – United States Virgin Islands (US overseas territory)

== W ==
- Outline of Western Sahara
- Outline of Western Samoa
- Outline of Wales
- Outline of Wallis and Futuna

== Y ==
- Outline of Yemen
- Outline of Yugoslavia

== Z ==
- Outline of Zaire
- Outline of Zambia
- Outline of Zimbabwe

== See also ==
- World history (field)
- Lists by country
- List of countries
