= 2020 Falkland Islands electoral system referendum =

Falkland Islands electoral system referendum
- 24 September 2020
- Should there be two constituencies, Stanley and Camp, or should there be one constituency for the whole of the Falkland Islands?

Results
Choice	Votes	%
One constituency	417	50.67%
Two constituencies	406	49.33%
Valid votes	823	99.16%
Invalid or blank votes	7	0.84%
Total votes	830	100.00%
Registered voters/turnout	1,592	52.14%

A referendum on reforming the electoral system was held in the Falkland Islands on 24 September 2020, after being postponed from 26 March 2020 following the Coronavirus pandemic. Voters were asked if they wanted to replace the two existing electoral constituencies (Camp and Stanley) with a single constituency for the whole of the Islands. Although a majority of those who voted supported the change, the required two-thirds majority in both of the islands' constituencies was not achieved.

== Background ==
Under section 27 of the Falkland Islands Constitution, any change to the constituencies on the islands must be supported in a referendum by at least two-thirds of those who are registered as electors in each constituency.

Elections in the Falkland Islands are held every four years to elect eight members to the Legislative Assembly using multiple non-transferable vote. The Camp constituency is currently heavily over-represented in the Legislative Assembly, electing three of the eight seats (38% of the total) with the remaining five seats being elected from the Stanley constituency (62.5%). However, according to the 2016 census, 87% of the islands' population live in Stanley, compared to 13% in Camp.

It is the third time in 18 years that the Falkland Islanders were asked to vote on creating a single constituency for the whole of the Islands. The first referendum was held on 22 November 2001, to coincide with that year's general election, and asked "Do you agree that there should be a single constituency for the Falkland Islands, with a new voting system for proportional representation?". This was rejected by 56.65% to 43.35% overall and there were majorities against in both constituencies, with the 'No' vote in Camp being over 70%.

Another referendum was held ten years later on 3 November 2011, but this time only asked voters if they wanted a single constituency and did not include provisions for changing the voting system. The question was again rejected, this time by 58.78% to 41.22% overall. A narrow majority of voters in Stanley (50.2% to 49.8%) voted in favour but over 80% in Camp voted against.

In August 2018 the Falkland Islands Government announced that another referendum on creating a single constituency would be held on 7 November 2019. However, on 24 July 2019 the Executive Council of the Falkland Islands agreed that polling day should be moved to 26 March 2020 and then in March 2020, polling day was pushed back to 24 September 2020 owing to the coronavirus pandemic. The original date of November 2019 was chosen to allow sufficient preparation time for the referendum and also (in the event the referendum question is approved) have enough time to make appropriate amendments to the Electoral Ordinance and Constitution before the next election, expected to take place in November 2021.

== Referendum question ==
The proposed question to appear on ballot papers for the referendum was set out at a meeting of the Executive Council on 26 June 2019 under Standing Order 23(2) and published on 8 July 2019. Eight variations of the referendum question were proposed at the meeting, with the following being approved:

Should there be two constituencies, Stanley and Camp, or should there be one constituency for the whole of the Falkland Islands?

with the responses to the question to be (to be marked with a single (X)):

There should be one constituency. I support the Single Constituency Bill

There should continue to be two constituencies. I do not support the Single Constituency Bill

== Results ==
2020 Falkland Islands electoral system referendum
Choice	Votes	%
One constituency	417	50.67
Two constituencies	406	49.33
Total	823	100.00
Valid votes	823	99.16
Invalid/blank votes	7	0.84
Total votes	830	100.00
Registered voters/turnout	1,592	52.14
Source: Mercopress

=== By constituency ===
Region	One constituency		Two constituencies	
Region	Votes	%	Votes	%
Camp constituency	71	31.70	153	68.30
Stanley constituency	346	57.76	253	42.24
Total	417	50.67	406	49.33
Source: Mercopress

Under Chapter III of the Constitution of the Falkland Islands, a two-thirds majority was required in both of the islands' constituencies for the changes to come into force. Although a majority of voters supported the change, only 58% of Stanley voters were in favour and in Camp a majority voted against the changes.
