= Telecommunications in the Falkland Islands =

Telecommunications in the Falkland Islands includes radio, television, fixed and mobile telephones, and the Internet.

== Radio and television ==
- Radio: Radio services provided by the public broadcaster, Falkland Islands Radio Service, broadcasting on both AM and FM frequencies, and by the British Forces Broadcasting Service (BFBS) (2007).
- Radio sets: 1,000 (1997).
- Television: TV service provided by a multi-channel service provider (2007).
- Television sets: 1,008 (2001).

Six free-to-air digital channels are provided by BFBS: BBC One, BBC Two, ITV, Channel 4, Sky News and BFBS Extra for non-military audiences. Entitled personnel within British Forces South Atlantic can also receive Sky Sports 1, Sky Sports 2 and BFBS Sport.

A local subscription service, KTV carries satellite channels such as ESPN, Discovery, CNN International and Turner Classic Movies (from the United States) along with BBC World News from the United Kingdom.

== Telephones ==
- Calling code: +500
- International call prefix: 00
- Main lines: 1,980 lines in use (2012), 218th in the world.
- Mobile cellular: 3,450 lines, 216th in the world (2012); Cable & Wireless launched "Touch" a GSM 900 mobile service during December 2005; Roaming became partially available in April 2007 depending on providers.
- Domestic: Government-operated radiotelephone and private VHF/CB radiotelephone networks provide effective service to almost all points on both islands (2011). Services in Stanley are delivered via fibre optic and copper. Telephone penetration by household is 100%.
- Satellite earth station: 1 Intelsat (Atlantic Ocean) with links through the United Kingdom to other countries (2011).

== Internet ==
- Top-level domain: .fk
- Internet users: 2,842 users, 208th in the world; 96.9% of the population, 1st in the world (2012).
- Fixed broadband: 1,187 subscriptions, 179th in the world; 40.5% of the population, 5th in the world (2012).
- Wireless broadband: unknown (2012).
- Internet hosts: 110 hosts, 207th in the world (2012).
- Internet service providers (ISPs): Sure South Atlantic (formerly Cable & Wireless). ADSL services were launched in Stanley in mid-2006. Starlink became legal in 2025.
