= List of mammals of the Falkland Islands =

This is a list of the mammal species recorded in the Falkland Islands. There are 28 mammal species in and around the Falkland Islands, of which two are endangered and two are vulnerable. The Falkland Island wolf is the only species on the islands which has gone extinct.

The following tags are used to highlight each species' conservation status as assessed by the International Union for Conservation of Nature:

EX	Extinct	No reasonable doubt that the last individual has died.
EW	Extinct in the wild	Known only to survive in captivity or as a naturalized populations well outside its previous range.
CR	Critically endangered	The species is in imminent risk of extinction in the wild.
EN	Endangered	The species is facing an extremely high risk of extinction in the wild.
VU	Vulnerable	The species is facing a high risk of extinction in the wild.
NT	Near threatened	The species does not meet any of the criteria that would categorise it as risking extinction but it is likely to do so in the future.
LC	Least concern	There are no current identifiable risks to the species.
DD	Data deficient	There is inadequate information to make an assessment of the risks to this species.

Some species were assessed using an earlier set of criteria. Species assessed using this system have the following instead of near threatened and least concern categories:

LR/cd	Lower risk/conservation dependent	Species which were the focus of conservation programmes and may have moved into a higher risk category if that programme was discontinued.
LR/nt	Lower risk/near threatened	Species which are close to being classified as vulnerable but are not the subject of conservation programmes.
LR/lc	Lower risk/least concern	Species for which there are no identifiable risks.

== Order: Chiroptera (bats) ==
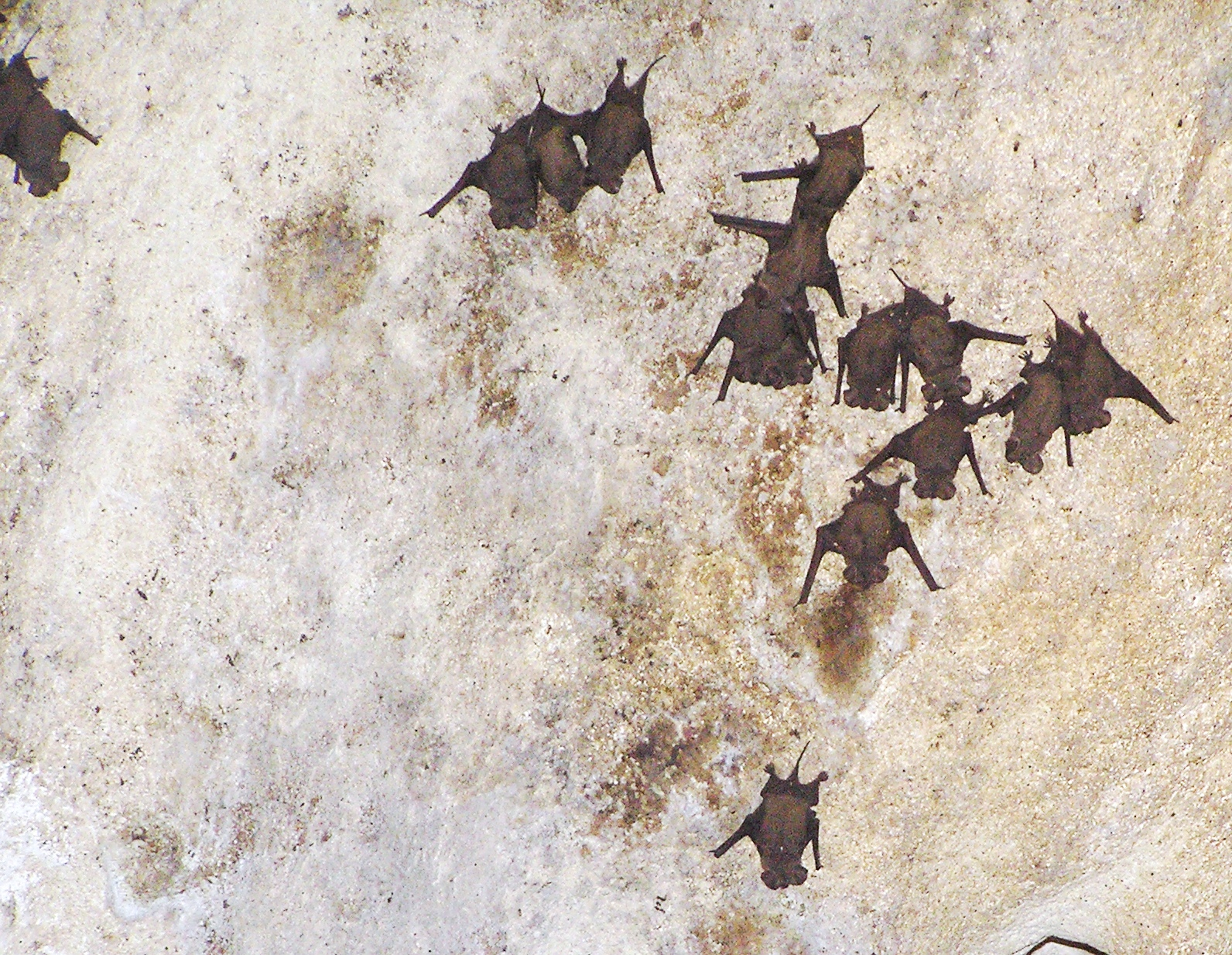
Mexican free-tailed bats

The bats' most distinguishing feature is that their forelimbs are developed as wings, making them the only mammals capable of flight. Bat species account for about 20% of all mammals.

- Family: Molossidae
  - Genus: Tadarida
    - Mexican free-tailed bat, T. brasiliensis LC

== Order: Cetacea (whales) ==
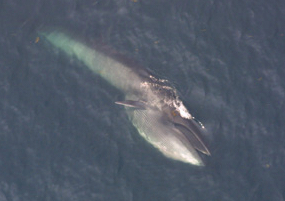
Sei whale

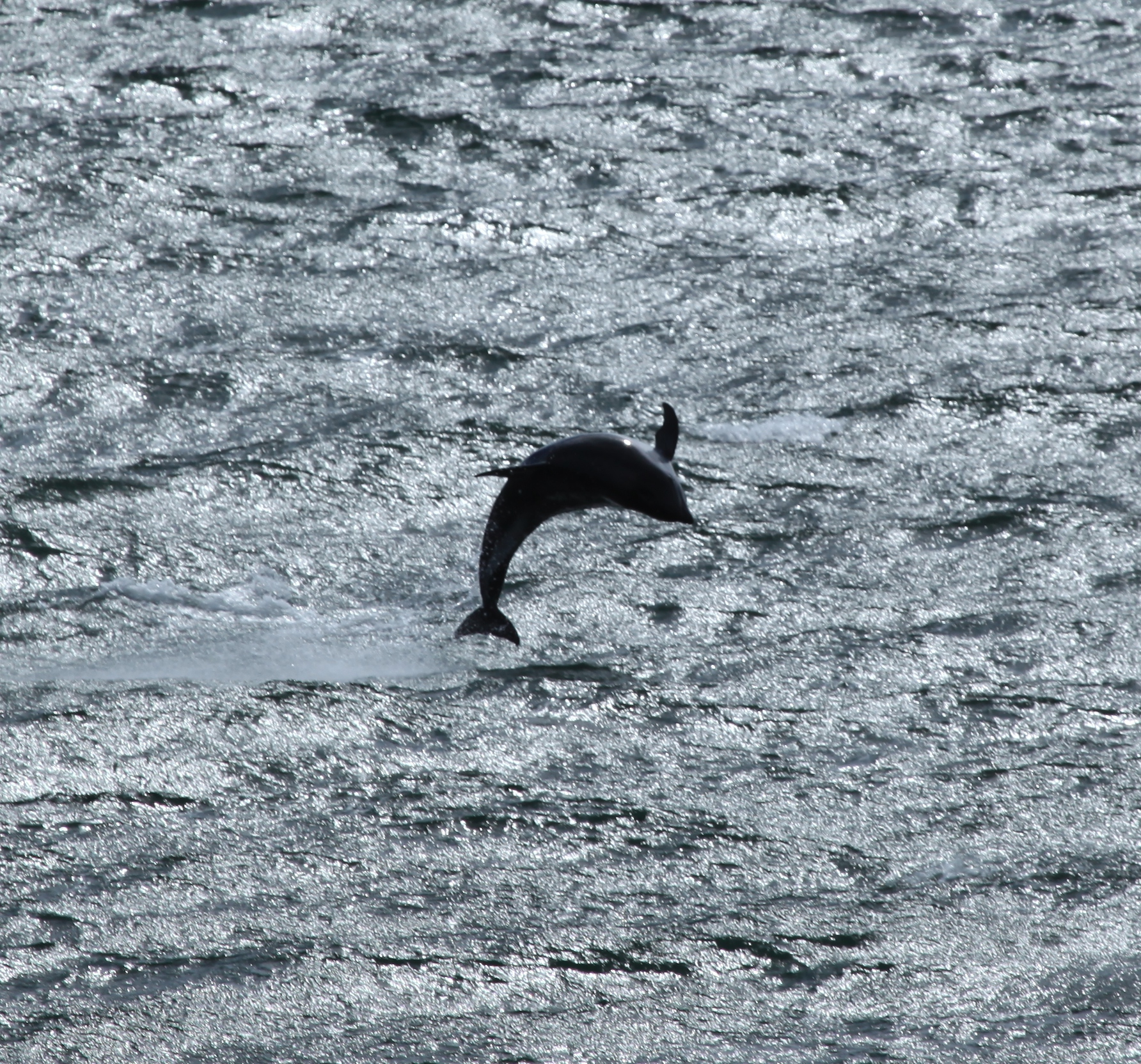
Peale's dolphin jumping near Stanley

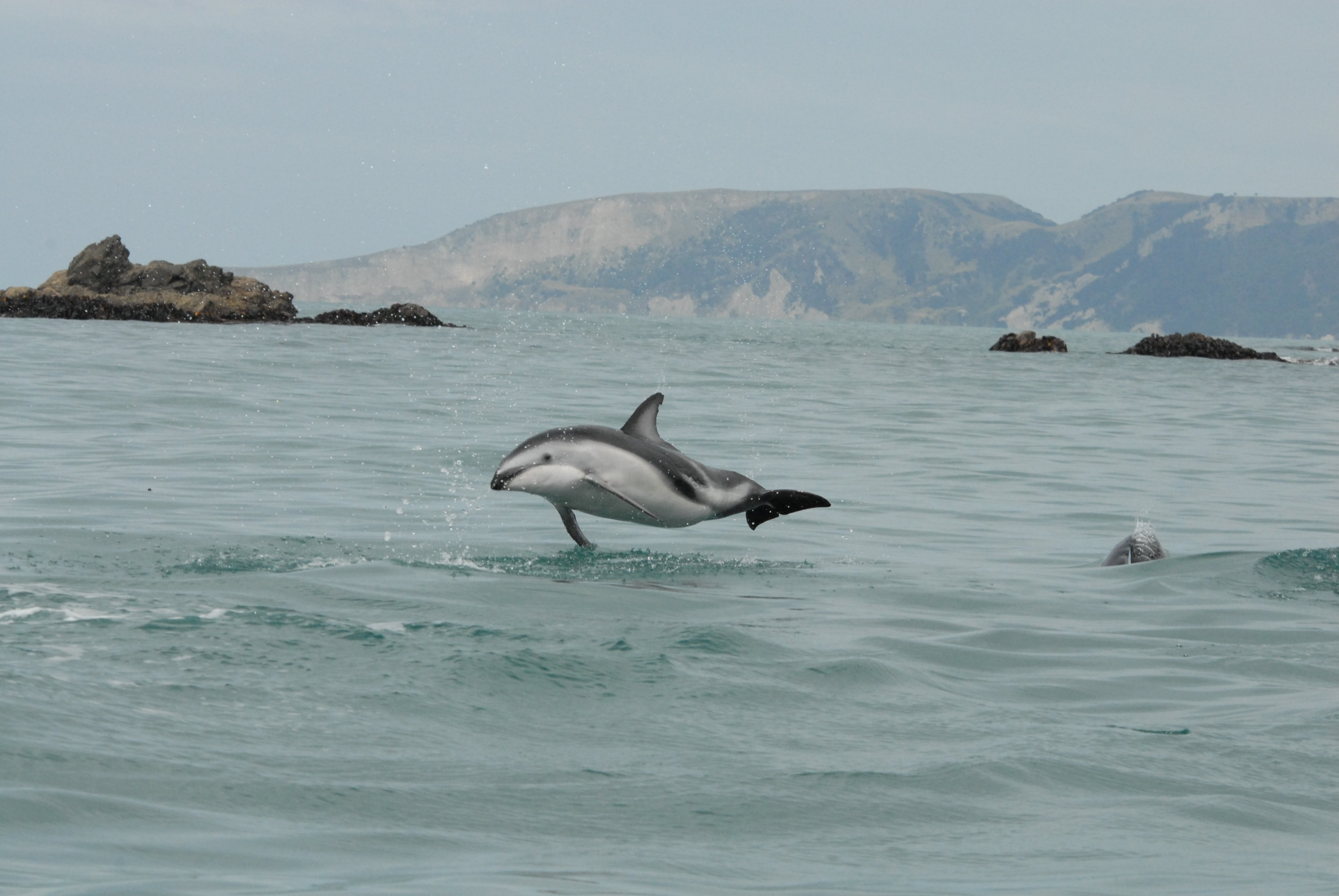
Dusky dolphin

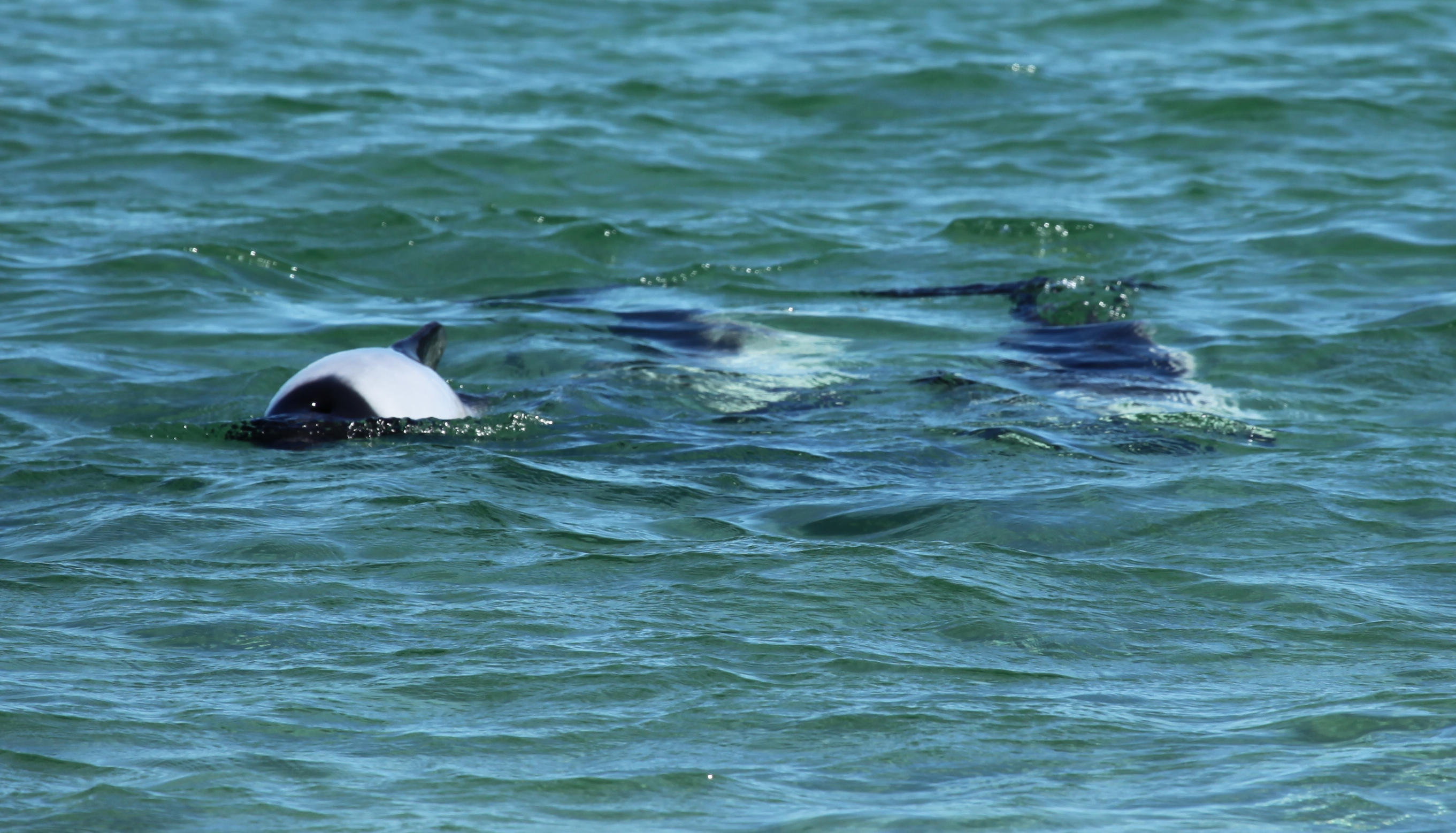
Commerson's dolphins at Saunders Island

The order Cetacea includes whales, dolphins and porpoises. They are the mammals most fully adapted to aquatic life with a spindle-shaped nearly hairless body, protected by a thick layer of blubber, and forelimbs and tail modified to provide propulsion underwater.

- Suborder: Mysticeti
    - Family: Balaenidae
      - Genus: Eubalaena
        - Southern right whale, Eubalaena australis LR/cd
    - Family: Balaenopteridae
      - Subfamily: Balaenopterinae
        - Genus: Balaenoptera
            - Sei whale, B. borealis EN
            - Southern sei whale, B. b. schlegelii
            - Blue whale, B. musculus EN
            - Southern blue whale, B. m. intermedia
            - Fin whale, B. physalus VU
            - Southern fin whale, B. p. quoyi
      - Subfamily: Megapterinae
        - Genus: Megaptera
          - Humpback whale, Megaptera novaeangliae LC
    - Family: Neobalaenidae
      - Genus: Caperea
        - Pygmy right whale, Caperea marginata LR/lc
- Suborder: Odontoceti
  - Superfamily: Platanistoidea
    - Family: Phocoenidae
      - Genus: Phocoena
        - Spectacled porpoise, Phocoena dioptrica DD
    - Family: Physeteridae
      - Genus: Physeter
        - Sperm whale, Physeter macrocephalus VU
    - Family: Ziphidae
      - Genus: Ziphius
        - Cuvier's beaked whale, Ziphius cavirostris DD
      - Genus: Berardius
        - Arnoux's beaked whale, Berardius arnuxii DD
      - Subfamily: Hyperoodontinae
        - Genus: Hyperoodon
          - Southern bottlenose whale, Hyperoodon planifrons LC
        - Genus: Mesoplodon
          - Gray's beaked whale, Mesoplodon grayi DD
          - Hector's beaked whale, Mesoplodon hectori DD
          - Layard's beaked whale, Mesoplodon layardii DD
    - Family: Delphinidae (marine dolphins)
      - Genus: Cephalorhynchus
        - Commerson's dolphin, Cephalorhynchus commersonii DD
      - Genus: Lagenorhynchus
        - Peale's dolphin, Lagenorhynchus australis DD
        - Hourglass dolphin, Lagenorhynchus cruciger LR/lc
        - Dusky dolphin, Lagenorhynchus obscurus DD
      - Genus: Lissodelphis
        - Southern right whale dolphin, Lissodelphis peronii DD
      - Genus: Orcinus
        - Orca, Orcinus orca LR/cd
      - Genus: Globicephala
        - Long-finned pilot whale, Globicephala melas DD

== Order: Carnivora (carnivorans) ==
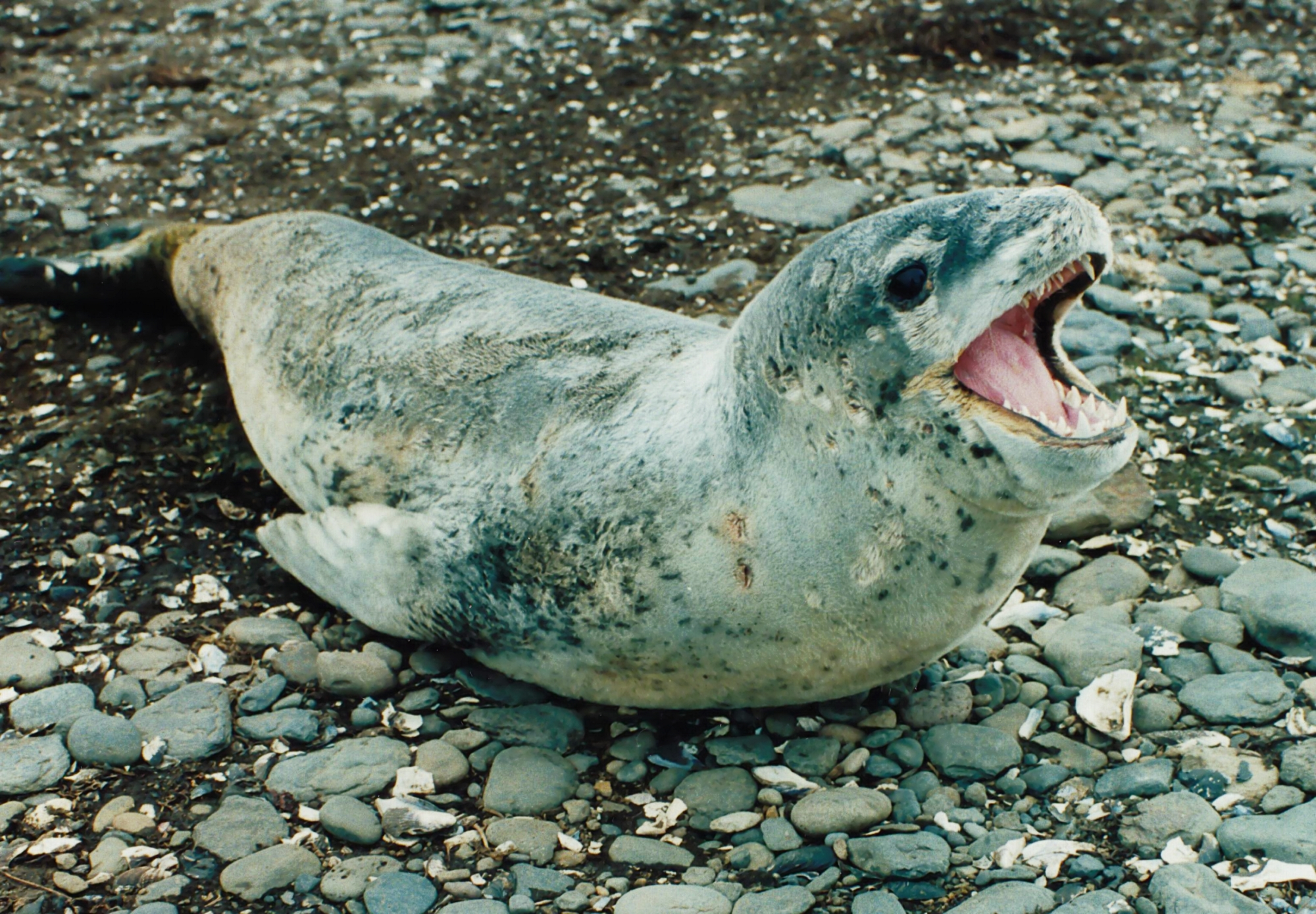
Leopard seal

There are over 260 species of carnivorans, the majority of which feed primarily on meat. They have a characteristic skull shape and dentition.

- Suborder: Caniformia
  - Family: Canidae (dogs, foxes)
    - Genus: Dusicyon
      - Falkland Island wolf, D. australis EX
    - Genus: Lycalopex
      - South American grey fox, L. griseus LR/lc introduced
  - Family: Otariidae (eared seals, sealions)
    - Genus: Arctophoca
      - South American fur seal, Arctophoca australis LR/lc
    - Genus: Otaria
      - South American sea lion, Otaria flavescens LR/lc
  - Family: Phocidae (earless seals)
    - Genus: Hydrurga
      - Leopard seal, Hydrurga leptonyx LR/lc
    - Genus: Leptonychotes
      - Weddell seal, Leptonychotes weddellii LR/lc
    - Genus: Lobodon
      - Crabeater seal, Lobodon carcinophagus LR/lc
    - Genus: Mirounga
      - Southern elephant seal, Mirounga leonina LR/ VU
  - Family: Mustelidae
    - Genus: Lontra (otters)
      - Marine otter, Lontra felina, EX (occasional vagrant sightings from Patagonia.)

== Order: Artiodactyla (even-toed ungulates) ==
The even-toed ungulates are ungulates whose weight is borne about equally by the third and fourth toes, rather than mostly or entirely by the third as in perissodactyls. There are about 220 artiodactyl species, including many that are of great economic importance to humans.

- Family: Cervidae (deer)
  - Subfamily: Capreolinae
    - Genus: Rangifer
      - Reindeer, R. tarandus VU introduced
- Family: Bovidae (bovids)
    - Genus: Ovis
      - Feral sheep, O. aries NE introduced
- Family: Camelidae (camelids)
    - Genus: Lama
      - Guanaco, L. guanicoe LC introduced

== See also ==
- List of chordate orders
- Lists of mammals by region
- List of prehistoric mammals
- Mammal classification
- List of mammals described in the 2000s
