= Climate of the Falkland Islands =

Map of the Falkland Islands showing the elevations of different parts of the archipelago

The climate of the Falkland Islands is cool and temperate, regulated by the large oceans which surround it. The Falkland Islands are a British Overseas Territory located over 480 kilometres (298 mi) from South America, to the north of the Antarctic Convergence, where cooler waters from the south mix with warmer waters from the north.

Winds mostly come from the west, creating a difference between the relative levels of precipitation between the eastern islands and the western islands. The total annual rainfall is only about 573.6 mm (23 in). Although snow falls, strong winds mean it often fails to settle.

The temperature of the islands fluctuates within a narrow band, not reaching higher than 24 °C (75 °F) or lower than −5 °C (23 °F). There are long hours of daylight in the summer, although the actual number of hours of sunlight is limited by cloud cover.

== Köppen classification ==

The Falkland Islands have a maritime climate in the transition region between the tundra and subpolar zones (Köppen classifications ET and Cfc respectively). The climate is very much influenced by the cool South Atlantic Ocean and its northerly Patagonian current. The oceanic climatic type is characterised by both low seasonal and diurnal temperature ranges and no marked wet and dry season while in the sub-arctic zone, the average monthly maximum temperature exceeds 10 °C (50 °F) for no more than four months of the year and the average monthly minimum does not drop below −3 °C (27 °F).

In addition to parts of the Falklands, a maritime subarctic climatic zone is found in parts of coastal Iceland, Faroe Islands, northwestern coastal Norway, southern islands of Alaska and parts of the Alaskan Panhandle, the southern tip of South America and mountainous areas of Europe including the Scottish Highlands and southwestern Norway.

== Sunshine ==
During summer the Falklands experience long daylight hours. During summer, the islands run on Daylight Saving Time, at UTC −3 as opposed to the normal time of UTC −4, entering summer time at 2 am on the first Sunday of September and leaving it at 2 am on the third Sunday of April. However, due to cloud cover, the average number of hours in summer with direct sunlight is only 6 hours. The average number in winter is only 2–3. In 2011, the Falkland Islands government announced that the islands would remain in the summer time during the winter when the clocks would normally be set back.

== Winds ==
The winds moving over the islands are mostly westerly winds. There is almost no seasonal variation in wind direction, which is less than 17 knots (31 km/h) for 60 percent of the time, from 22 to 33 knots (41 to 61 km/h) for 20–25 percent of the time, and 34 knots (63 km/h) and above 8–12 percent of the time. Gales are frequent, especially during winter. The average wind speed in Stanley is 16 knots (30 km/h).

== Temperature ==
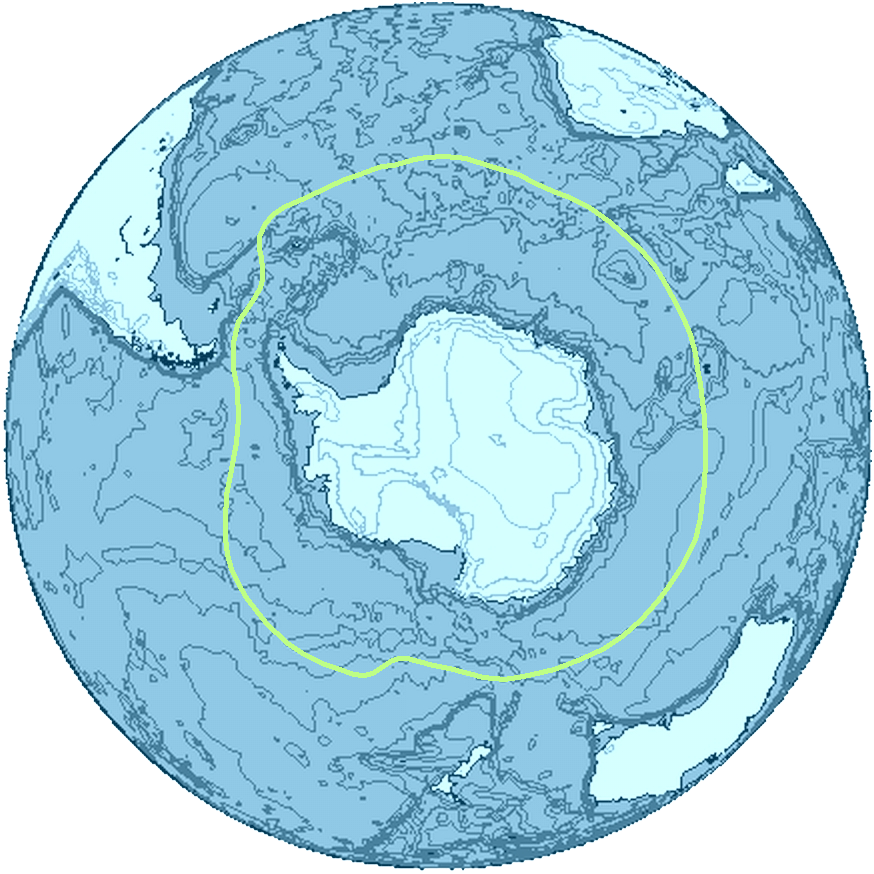
The Antarctic Convergence, where cold waters from the south mix with warm waters from the north helping to regulate temperature

The islands have cool temperatures, which fluctuate in a narrow range. Average monthly temperatures range from around 9 °C (48 °F) in January and February to around 2 °C (36 °F) in June and July, corresponding with summer and winter. The maximum temperature reached is around 24 °C (75 °F) in January, and the minimum is −5 °C (23 °F) in July. The annual average is around 5.6 °C (42 °F).

The archipelago is located 300 miles (483 km) from the coast of South America, between 51° and 52°S. The location of the archipelago, to the north of the Antarctic Convergence, helps to moderate the temperature as cool waters from Antarctica mix with warmer waters from the Atlantic.

== Precipitation ==
Rainfall remains almost constant throughout the year, although it is low because of the archipelago's location to the east of South America. Owing to the westerlies and the shielding effect of the Andes, the western side of the archipelago is much drier than the eastern side, and mountain ranges are much wetter on their eastern slopes than their western slopes. Port Stanley and Port Howard on the eastern islands both receive about 630 mm (25 in) of rainfall every year, as opposed to islands such as Westpoint which only receives 430 mm (17 in) a year. The overall rainfall for the archipelago is around 573.6 mm (23 in). The flat areas, in particular Lafonia are the driest areas of the islands with precipitation in the range of 273–485 mm (11–19 in) a year. Other writers have recorded an average of 310 mm per year in the west of the islands.

The rainfall in 2009 as recorded from 17 different stations in The Wool Press varied between 356 mm at Cape Dolphin and 898 mm at Port Howard.

During winter sleet and snow does fall, but it is temporary and does not often settle for long. Due to vegetation on the islands resembling a tundra, the ground remains damp as it is often impermeable to water.

== Climate changes ==
The climate has become drier and warmer over the past 50 years, but it is predicted that the islands will become cooler with more rain and cloud cover. This is because melting Antarctic ice is predicted to result in cooler air from the south, counteracting warmer air from the north. Sea temperature has also risen steadily since the 1960s. Rainfall data suggests that it increased from 1910 to 1940, decreased until 1995, then began to increase again. Storms are predicted to increase in frequency and intensity.

This information has been determined through meteorological data from 1923 to 1981, with most recent data not being fully analysed. The temperature of the sea around the archipelago fluctuates greatly around predicted values.

== Climate statistics ==
Climate data for Stanley, Falkland Islands, 2m asl, 1929–1970
Month	Jan	Feb	Mar	Apr	May	Jun	Jul	Aug	Sep	Oct	Nov	Dec	Year
Record high °C (°F)	24.4 (75.9)	23.3 (73.9)	21.1 (70.0)	17.2 (63.0)	14.1 (57.4)	10.6 (51.1)	10.0 (50.0)	11.1 (52.0)	15.0 (59.0)	17.8 (64.0)	21.7 (71.1)	21.7 (71.1)	24.4 (75.9)
Mean daily maximum °C (°F)	13.3 (55.9)	12.8 (55.0)	11.7 (53.1)	9.4 (48.9)	6.7 (44.1)	5.0 (41.0)	4.4 (39.9)	5.0 (41.0)	7.2 (45.0)	8.9 (48.0)	11.1 (52.0)	12.2 (54.0)	9.0 (48.2)
Daily mean °C (°F)	9.5 (49.1)	8.9 (48.0)	8.1 (46.6)	6.1 (43.0)	3.9 (39.0)	2.2 (36.0)	1.9 (35.4)	2.2 (36.0)	3.9 (39.0)	5.3 (41.5)	7.0 (44.6)	8.1 (46.6)	5.6 (42.1)
Mean daily minimum °C (°F)	5.6 (42.1)	5.0 (41.0)	4.4 (39.9)	2.8 (37.0)	1.1 (34.0)	0.0 (32.0)	−0.6 (30.9)	−0.6 (30.9)	0.6 (33.1)	1.7 (35.1)	2.8 (37.0)	3.9 (39.0)	2.2 (36.0)
Record low °C (°F)	−1.1 (30.0)	−1.1 (30.0)	−2.8 (27.0)	−6.1 (21.0)	−6.7 (19.9)	−11.1 (12.0)	−8.9 (16.0)	−11.1 (12.0)	−10.6 (12.9)	−5.6 (21.9)	−3.3 (26.1)	−1.7 (28.9)	−11.1 (12.0)
Average precipitation mm (inches)	71 (2.8)	58 (2.3)	64 (2.5)	66 (2.6)	66 (2.6)	53 (2.1)	51 (2.0)	51 (2.0)	38 (1.5)	41 (1.6)	51 (2.0)	71 (2.8)	681 (26.8)
Average precipitation days (≥ 0.1 mm)	15	12	10	11	13	11	12	9	9	7	10	14	133
Average relative humidity (%)	78	79	82	86	88	89	89	87	84	80	75	77	83
Mean monthly sunshine hours	198	161	169	115	77	57	69	90	128	189	200	198	1,651
Source 1: Globalbioclimatics/Salvador Rivas-Martínez
Source 2: DMI/Danish Meteorology Institute (sun, humidity, and precipitation days 1931–1960)

Climate data for Mount Pleasant EGYP, East Falkland, 74m asl, 1999–2019
Month	Jan	Feb	Mar	Apr	May	Jun	Jul	Aug	Sep	Oct	Nov	Dec	Year
Record high °C (°F)	26.0 (78.8)	26.8 (80.2)	25.5 (77.9)	26.1 (79.0)	17.8 (64.0)	15.7 (60.3)	12.3 (54.1)	15.11 (59.20)	22.2 (72.0)	17.8 (64.0)	21.7 (71.1)	25.3 (77.5)	26.8 (80.2)
Mean daily maximum °C (°F)	16.8 (62.2)	15.9 (60.6)	14.6 (58.3)	10.9 (51.6)	8.1 (46.6)	5.9 (42.6)	5.4 (41.7)	6.6 (43.9)	8.8 (47.8)	11.7 (53.1)	13.5 (56.3)	15.4 (59.7)	11.1 (52.0)
Mean daily minimum °C (°F)	6.2 (43.2)	6.1 (43.0)	5.1 (41.2)	3.3 (37.9)	1.6 (34.9)	0.4 (32.7)	−0.3 (31.5)	0.3 (32.5)	1.0 (33.8)	2.2 (36.0)	3.4 (38.1)	5.0 (41.0)	2.9 (37.2)
Record low °C (°F)	−0.1 (31.8)	−0.8 (30.6)	−0.6 (30.9)	−2.8 (27.0)	−6.1 (21.0)	−10.1 (13.8)	−10.3 (13.5)	−6.5 (20.3)	−9.8 (14.4)	−3.1 (26.4)	−5.5 (22.1)	−1.5 (29.3)	−10.1 (13.8)
Source: NCDC
