= Demographics of the Falkland Islands =

- Population: 3,662 ▲ (2021)
- Density: 0.30/km^{2} (0.78/sq mi)
- Immigrant share: 67.2% (2024)

Age structure
- 0–14 years: 15.7% (2021)
- 15–64 years: 72.3%
- 65 and over: 12.0%

Nationality
- Nationality: Falkland Islander: 52.3% British: 37.0% St. Helenian: 10.9% Filipino: 5.6% Chilean: 4.8% Zimbabwean: 1.8% South African: 1.8% Peruvian: 0.9% Australian: 0.3% Brazilian: 0.3% New Zealander: 0.3% Indian: 0.3%

Language
- Spoken: Falkland Islands English

The demographics of the Falkland Islands have been measured by census since 1851.

== Population ==
Population pyramid 2021
%	Males	Age	Females	%
0.3		90+		0.6
0.5		85–89		0.7
1.8		80–84		1.3
2.1		75–79		2.2
3.2		70–74		3.0
4.6		65–69		3.7
5.8		60–64		5.9
7.7		55–59		7.0
9.7		50–54		8.2
9.6		45–49		9.2
9.5		40–44		9.6
8.6		35–39		9.0
7.8		30–34		8.1
6.4		25–29		6.9
4.4		20–24		3.8
3.1		15–19		4.1
4.1		10–14		4.9
7.2		5–9		7.1
3.5		0–4		4.7

Year	Total population	Population on census night	Male	Female	Ratio
1851	287				
1861	541				
1871	811				
1881	1,510				
1891	1,789				
1901	2,043				
1911	2,272				
1921	2,094				
1931	2,392				
1946	2,239				
1953	2,230				
1962	2,172				
1972	1,957				
1980	1,813				
1986	1,885				
1991	2,050				
1996	2,564				
2001	2,913				
2006	2,955	2,955	1,569	1,386	1.13:1
2012	2,931	2,840	1,491	1,349	1.11:1
2016	3,398	3,200	1,687	1,511	1.12:1
2021	3,662	3,541	1,847	1,694	1.1:1

=== Non-census estimates ===
Date	Method	Total population
1990	CIA estimate	1,958
2000	Treasury of the Falkland Islands Govt estimate	2,826
2007	CIA estimate	3,105

== By region ==
Stanley has the majority of the Falklands' population.

Year	Stanley		RAF Mount Pleasant		Rest of East Falkland		West Falkland		Outer islands		Total
Year	Pop.	%	Pop.	%	Pop.	%	Pop.	%	Pop.	%	Total
1986	1,232	65.4%	N/A		388	20.6%	265	14.1%	N/A		1,885
1991	1,557	76.0%	N/A		245	12.0%	196	9.6%	52	2.5%	2,050
1996	1,636	63.8%	483	18.9%	233	9.1%	174	6.8%	38	1.5%	2,564
2001	1,636	63.8%	483	18.9%	233	9.1%	174	6.8%	38	1.5%	2,913
2006	2,115	71.6%	477	16.1%	194	6.6%	127	4.3%	42	1.4%	2,955
2012	2,120	74.6%	369	13.0%	202	7.1%	127	4.5%	22	0.8%	2,840
2016	2,460	76.9%	359	11.2%	190	5.9%	151	4.7%	40	1.3%	3,200
2021	2,538	80.8%	324	10.3%	149	4.7%	95	3.0%	36	1.1%	3,142
