= Fauna of the Falkland Islands =

Native animals of the Falkland Islands

== Coleoptera ==
- Carabidae
  - Migadopini
    - Lissopterus hyadesii falklandicus
    - Lissopterus quadrinotatus
    - Migadops latus lebruni
    - Pseudomigadops falklandicus
    - Pseudomigadops fuscus fuscus
    - Pseudomigadops fuscus sericeus
    - Pseudomigadops handkei handkei
    - Pseudomigadops handkei punctatus
  - etc.
- Curculionidae
  - Cyclominae
    - Antarctobius abditus
    - Antarctobius bidentatus
    - Antarctobius falklandicus
    - Antarctobius malvinensis
    - Antarctobius vulsus
    - Falklandiellus suffodens
    - Falklandius antarcticus
    - Falklandius goliath
    - Falklandius kuscheli
    - Falklandius turbificatus
    - Germainiellus salebrosus
    - Haversiella albolimbata
    - Lanteriella microphtalma [endemic genus/species]
    - Puranius championi
    - Puranius exculpticollis
    - Puranius scaber
  - Entiminae
    - Caneorhinus biangulatus
    - Cylydrorhinus caudiculatus
    - Cylydrorhinus lemniscatus
    - Malvinius compressiventris [endemic genus/species]
    - Malvinius nordenskioeldi [endemic genus/species]
    - Morronia brevirostris [endemic genus/species]
- etc.
