= 2013 Falkland Islands sovereignty referendum =

- 10–11 March 2013
- Do you wish the Falkland Islands to retain their current political status as an Overseas Territory of the United Kingdom?

Results
Choice	Votes	%
Yes	1,513	99.80%
No	3	0.20%
Valid votes	1,516	99.87%
Invalid or blank votes	2	0.13%
Total votes	1,518	100.00%
Registered voters/turnout	1,650	92%

A referendum on political status was held in the Falkland Islands on 10–11 March 2013. The Falkland Islanders were asked whether or not they supported the continuation of their status as an Overseas Territory of the United Kingdom in view of Argentina's call for negotiations on the islands' sovereignty.

On a turnout of 92%, 99.8% voted to remain a British territory, with only three votes against. Had the islanders rejected the continuation of their current status, a second referendum on possible alternatives would have been held. Brad Smith, the leader of the international observer group, announced that the referendum was free and fair and executed in accordance with international standards and international laws.

== History ==
=== Background ===
Negotiations over the sovereignty of the islands took place between Argentina and the United Kingdom in the 1960s and 1970s, but no agreement was ever reached. In 1982 the Argentine military junta, which ruled Argentina at the time, invaded and occupied the islands, beginning the Falklands War at the end of which the islands came back under British control. Since the war, Argentina has continued to call for the resumption of negotiations, but the United Kingdom refuses such requests, stating that the Falkland Islanders have the right to self-determination.

On the fourth anniversary of the start of the war, the Falkland Islands Association and the Marplan Institute conducted the Falkland Island Sovereignty Survey of all registered voters on the islands, the result of which showed that 96.45% of the islanders supported remaining a British territory. Eight years later, in an Argentine-inspired poll, 87% of the islanders rejected any form of discussion of sovereignty in any circumstances, preferring to remain British.

=== Recent tensions ===
Tensions over the status of the islands began to increase with approach of the 30th anniversary of the Falklands war and the decision of the Falkland Islands government to start oil exploration in Falklands territorial waters. This led to the government of Argentina banning Falklands flagged ships and vessels linked to the Falklands' oil industry from docking at Argentine ports. The Argentine government also began a diplomatic campaign, calling on several international groups to support the resumption of negotiations, gaining support from organisations such as the Union of South American Nations and the Rio Group.

In 2011 the Argentine defence minister, Arturo Puricelli, stated that the Falkland Islanders were kept as "hostages" on the islands and later suggested that the British military "is the only element that upholds the usurpation of that part of our national territory". This led to the Governor of the Falkland Islands, Nigel Haywood, proposing a referendum to see whether islanders want to remain British or not "so we can solve the issue once and for all".

=== Announcement and responses ===
On 12 June 2012, Gavin Short, a Member of the Falkland Islands Legislative Assembly, announced the intention of the Falkland Islands Government to hold a referendum in the first half of 2013, saying that:

We have thought carefully about how to convey a strong message to the outside world that expresses the views of the Falklands people in a clear, democratic and incontestable way. So we have decided, with the full support of the British Government, to hold a referendum on the Falkland Islands to eliminate any possible doubt about our wishes.

He made the announcement during a visit to the islands by Foreign Office Minister Jeremy Browne to mark the 30th anniversary of the Falklands War. Browne supported the holding of the referendum, calling it a "truly significant moment", saying that "It will give the Falkland Islands people the opportunity to send a clear message... that the Islanders, and they alone are masters of their fate." British Prime Minister David Cameron said that his Government supported the holding of the referendum and would "respect and defend" the result.

The Argentine government said the outcome of the referendum would not affect the country's claim to the islands. Daniel Filmus, chairman of the Argentine Senate Foreign Affairs committee, said it "does not change at all the Argentine position", while Guillermo Carmona, chairman of the Foreign Affairs Committee of Argentina's Chamber of Deputies, said "This has no value at all since Argentina rejects the possibility of self-determination for an implanted population, such as the implanted British population in the Malvinas".

At the 2012 G-20 Mexico summit Cameron confronted Argentine President Christina Fernandez de Kirchner and called on her to respect the referendum, while she said that the issue should be resolved in line with United Nations General Assembly resolution 40/21 November 1985. President Kirchner had earlier refused an invitation from the Falkland Islands Government to speak with a delegation of islanders.

On 28 November 2012, it was reported that Argentina had launched a campaign to "undermine the legitimacy" of the referendum. This consisted of dissuading British politicians from acting as observers in the referendum, and sending two diplomats on a tour of the Caribbean and Africa to argue for Argentina's claim to the islands and convince governments of the "inconvenience" of sending observers to monitor the referendum. During a visit to London on 6 February 2013 the Argentine Foreign minister, Hector Timerman, claimed that the Falkland Islanders "do not exist" as such, they are British citizens in disputed islands.

== Referendum details ==
The current political status of the Falkland Islands is that of an Overseas Territory of the United Kingdom. The Islands are internally self-governing, with the United Kingdom being responsible for defence and foreign affairs. Under Chapter 1 of the Falkland Islands Constitution, the people of the Falkland Islands have the right to self-determination. The referendum was called following Argentina's calls for negotiations over the sovereignty of the Falkland Islands and was undertaken to consult the people regarding their views on the political status of the Falkland Islands.

The final wording of the question was proposed by the Legislative Assembly in October 2012 and adopted by the Executive Council on 21 November 2012. The question posed by the referendum was:

Do you wish the Falkland Islands to retain their current political status as an Overseas Territory of the United Kingdom? YES or NO

In order to vote in the referendum, electors had to be resident in the islands, aged 18 or over and have Falkland Islands status. According to the 2012 census, 11% of the electorate were not born in either the Falkland Islands or the UK; this included 18 Argentine-born electors. Polls were open from 10:00 to 18:00 FKST (UTC−3) on Sunday 10 and Monday 11 March 2013 in the two constituencies of the islands (Stanley and Camp).

== Observers ==
Following the announcement of the referendum, British Minister of State for Foreign and Commonwealth Affairs, Jeremy Browne, said that the Falkland Islands Government would invite independent international observers to verify the outcome of the referendum. The Referendum International Observation Mission during the referendum was led by Brad Smith from the United States and included representatives from Canada, Mexico, Uruguay, Paraguay, Chile and New Zealand. Following the declaration of the results, Smith announced "the international observation mission has concluded that the voting process was executed in accordance with international standards and local laws. The process was technically sound, with a systematic adherence to established voting procedures... It is our finding that the Falkland Islands referendum process was free and fair, reflecting the democratic will of the voters of the Falkland Islands."

== Results ==
The results were announced by Keith Padgett, the Chief Executive of the Falkland Islands, at 22:40 in Stanley Town Hall. The high vote to remain a British territory was widely expected, with even the small Argentine population on the islands saying they would vote "yes". Out of the 1,518 ballots cast, only three were against keeping the islands' current status. Turnout was over 90% with 1,650 islanders eligible to vote in a population of 2,841. It was reported by The Guardian that at least one person may have voted "no" out of a desire for complete independence.

There was one blank vote and one invalid vote, the latter coming from a voter who both ticked the Yes box and crossed the No one. Despite recognising the intent for a yes vote, the officials considered it invalid, as the rules written directly above on the ballot clearly forbade making signs in both boxes. Around twenty to thirty "doubtful" votes with signs others than ticks or crosses in the yes box were examined during the count and deemed valid yes votes.

Shortly after the vote was announced, several islanders gathered in Victory Green, in the centre of Stanley, to celebrate the result.

Choice	Votes	%
For	1,513	99.80
Against	3	0.20
Total	1,516	100.00
Valid votes	1,516	99.87
Invalid votes	1	0.07
Blank votes	1	0.07
Total votes	1,518	100.00
Registered voters/turnout	1,650	92.00
Source: Final report, Guardian

== Reactions ==
Following the declaration, British Prime Minister David Cameron said "the Falkland Islanders have spoken so clearly about their future, and now other countries right across the world, I hope, will respect and revere this very, very clear result." Argentine President Cristina Fernández de Kirchner rejected the result and described the referendum as a "parody", saying "It is as if a consortium of squatters had voted on whether to continue illegally occupying a building."

On 18 April 2013, U.S. Congressman Mario Díaz-Balart introduced a resolution to the United States House of Representatives calling on the United States Government to officially recognise the referendum result. The resolution was cosponsored by 18 Republican and 7 Democratic members of the House and was referred to the House Committee on Foreign Affairs but not advanced further.

== See also ==
- 1980 Quebec referendum
- 1995 Quebec referendum
- 2002 Gibraltar sovereignty referendum
