= 2011 Falkland Islands electoral system referendum =

- 3 November 2011
- Do you want a single constituency for the whole of the Islands?

Results
Choice	Votes	%
Yes	284	41.22%
No	405	58.78%

A referendum on reforming the voting system was held in the Falkland Islands on 3 November 2011. Voters were asked "Do you want a single constituency for the whole of the Islands?" The proposal required a two-thirds majority in both of the islands' constituencies, but was rejected by 58.78% of voters overall; in Stanley it was narrowly approved by 50.2% of voters but in Camp it was widely rejected, with 84% voting against. Turnout was 70% in Camp and just 39% in Stanley.

== Background ==
Under section 27 of the Falkland Islands Constitution, any change to the constituencies on the islands must be supported in a referendum by at least two-thirds of the vote.

The proposal to create a single constituency for the islands was a response to Camp being heavily over-represented in the Legislative Assembly, electing three of the eight seats (38% of the total), whilst the remaining five seats were elected from Stanley (62.5%). In 2011 there were 262 voters (17%) in Camp and 1,315 (83%) in Stanley, meaning the current arrangements provided for one MLA for every 87 voters in Camp and one for every 263 in Stanley.

Originally the two constituencies had had equal representation, but had been changed as the population of Stanley increased. The proposal had already been put to voters in a referendum in 2001, and had been rejected. A second referendum was approved by the Assembly on 26 August 2011 by a vote of four to three.

== Results ==
The question posed by the referendum was:

Do you want a single constituency for the whole of the Islands?

Choice	Votes	%
For	284	41.22
Against	405	58.78
Total	689	100.00
Registered voters/turnout	1,571	–

=== Results by constituency ===
Region	No vote	No %	Yes vote	Yes %
Stanley constituency	253	49.8	255	50.2
Camp constituency	152	84.0	29	16.0
