= Song of the Falklands =

Unofficial anthem of the Falkland Islands

- Territorial anthem of Falkland Islands
- Lyrics: Christopher Lanham
- Music: Christopher Lanham

"Song of the Falklands" is the Territorial anthem of the Falkland Islands ("God Save the King" being the official). It was written in the 1930s by Christopher Lanham, a Hampshire schoolteacher, while working on West Falkland.

== Lyrics ==
I
In my heart there's a call for the isles far away
Where the wind from the Horn often wanders at play.
Where the kelp moves and swells to the wind and the tide
And penguins troop down from the lonely hillside.

Chorus:
Those isles of the sea are calling to me,
The smell of the camp fire a dear memory.
Though far I may roam, some day I’ll come home
To the islands, the Falklands, the isles of the sea.

II
There's a camp house down yonder I'm longing to see,
Though it's no gilded palace it's there I would be.
Just to be there again I would race o’er the foam,
For that lone house so far is my own home sweet home.

Chorus

III
Now we’re off to the Falklands, so wild and so free,
Where there's tussock and kelp and the red diddle-dee,
And the wild rugged beauty that thrills more than me
Is bred in the bones on the isles of the sea.

Chorus

== See also ==
- List of British anthems
