= 1986 Falkland Islands status referendum =

Unofficial Falkland referendum

- 2 April 1986
- What kind of sovereignty do you want for the Falkland Islands?
- Voting system: Postal questionnaire

Results
British	96.45%
Independence	1.66%
Argentine	0.33%
United Nations	0.33%
Other	1.22%

An unofficial status referendum was held in the Falkland Islands on 2 April 1986. The result was 96% in favour of continued British sovereignty, with 88% of registered voters taking part.

== Background ==
The referendum was carried out via a questionnaire sent out by the Falkland Islands Association and the Marplan Institute to all registered voters on the islands. The results of the "Falkland Island Sovereignty Survey" were released by Marplan on 2 April.

== Results ==
Choice	Votes	%
British sovereignty	869	96.45
Independence	15	1.66
Argentine sovereignty	3	0.33
United Nations Trust Territory	3	0.33
Other	11	1.22
Total	901	100.00
Valid votes	901	98.79
Invalid/blank votes	11	1.21
Total votes	912	100.00
Registered voters/turnout	1,033	88.29
Source: Direct Democracy
