= .fk =

Internet country code top-level domain for the Falkland Islands

- Introduced: 26 March 1997
- TLD type: Country code top-level domain
- Status: Active
- Registry: Sure South Atlantic Ltd.
- Sponsor: Falkland Islands Government
- Intended use: Entities connected with Falkland Islands
- Registered domains: 185 (31 December 2021)
- Registration restrictions: Residence in the Falkland Islands compulsory for registration
- Structure: Second-level registrations prohibited; registration is at third level under second level domains
- Documents: Management policy
- Registry website: regulatorfi.org.fk/fk-domain

.fk is the country code top-level domain (ccTLD) for the Falkland Islands.

== Registration ==
Registrants must be Falkland Islands residents.

Only registrations at third levels are possible under these second-level sub-domains:

Domain	Intended purpose
.co.fk	Commercial organisations
.org.fk	Non-commercial organisations
.gov.fk	Government
.ac.fk	Academic organisations
.nom.fk	Individuals
.net.fk	Network infrastructure
