= 2001 Falkland Islands electoral system referendum =

- 22 November 2001
- Do you agree that there should be a SINGLE CONSTITUENCY for the Falkland Islands, with a new voting system for proportional representation?

Results
Yes	43.35%
No	56.65%

The 2001 Falkland Islands electoral system referendum was held in the Falkland Islands on 22 November 2001, at the same time as the general election. Voters were asked whether or not they wanted to replace the two existing electoral constituencies (Camp and Stanley) with a single constituency for the whole of the Islands. Both constituencies voted against the proposal.

== Background ==
Under section 27 of the Falkland Islands Constitution, any change to the constituencies on the islands must be supported in a referendum by at least two-thirds of those who are registered as electors in each constituency.

Elections in the Falkland Islands are held every four years to elect eight members to the Legislative Assembly using multiple non-transferable vote. The Camp constituency is currently heavily over-represented in the Legislative Assembly, electing three of the eight seats (38% of the total) with the remaining five seats being elected from the Stanley constituency (62.5%). However, nearly 90% of the islands' population live in Stanley, compared to just over 10% in Camp.

== Question ==
The question posed by the referendum was:

Do you agree that there should be a SINGLE CONSTITUENCY for the Falkland Islands, with a new voting system for proportional representation?

== Results ==
Falkland Islands electoral system referendum, 2001
Choice	Votes	%
For	456	43.35
Against	596	56.65
Total	1,052	100.00
Valid votes	1,052	98.50
Invalid/blank votes	16	1.50
Total votes	1,068	100.00
Registered voters/turnout	1,502	71.11
Source: Falkland News

=== By constituency ===
Region	Yes		No	
Region	Votes	%	Votes	%
Camp constituency	61	24.69	187	75.40
Stanley constituency	395	49.13	409	50.87
Total	417	43.35	596	56.65
Source:Falkland News

Under Chapter III of the Constitution of the Falkland Islands, a two-thirds majority was required in both of the islands' constituencies for the changes to come into force. This is the last referendum in which Stanley voted against forming one constituency.
