= Falkland Islands =

Archipelago in the South Atlantic Ocean

- British Overseas Territory
- Flag Coat of arms
- Motto: "Desire the Right"
- Anthem: "God Save the King" (Note: "God Save the King" is the national anthem by custom, not statute, and there is no authorised version. Typically only the first verse is usually sung, although the second verse is also often sung as well at state and public events. The words King, he, him, his, used at present, are replaced by Queen, she, her when the monarch is female.)
- Territorial anthem: "Song of the Falklands"
- Location of the Falkland Islands
- Sovereignty: United Kingdom
- First settlement: 1764
- British rule reasserted: 3 January 1833
- Falklands War: 2 April to 14 June 1982
- Current constitution: 1 January 2009
- Named after: Anthony Cary, 5th Viscount Falkland
- Capital and largest settlement: Stanley; 51°41′43″S 57°50′58″W
- Official languages: English
- Demonym(s): Falkland Islander, Falklander
- Government: Dependency under a constitutional monarchy
  - Monarch: Charles III
  - Governor: Colin Martin-Reynolds
  - Chief Executive: Andrea Clausen
- Legislature: Legislative Assembly

Government of the United Kingdom
  - Minister: Uma Kumaran

Area
  - Total: 12,173 km^{2} (4,700 sq mi)
  - Water (%): negligible
- Highest elevation: 705 m (2,313 ft)

Population
  - 2021 census: 3,662 (not ranked)
  - Density: 0.30/km^{2} (0.8/sq mi) (not ranked)
- GDP (nominal): 2024 estimate
  - Total: FKP£288 million (US$368 million)
  - Per capita: FKP£86,050 (US$109,980) (not ranked)
- Gini (2015): ▲36.0 medium
- HDI (2010): 0.874 very high · not ranked
- Currency: Falkland Islands pound (£; FKP); Sterling (£; GBP)
- Time zone: UTC– 03:00 (FKST)
- Calling code: +500
- UK postcode: FIQQ 1ZZ
- ISO 3166 code: FK
- Internet TLD: .fk
- Website: gov.fk

The Falkland Islands (/ˈfɔː(l)klənd, ˈfɒlk-/; Spanish: Islas Malvinas [ˈislas malˈβinas]), commonly referred to as the Falklands, is an archipelago in the South Atlantic Ocean on the Patagonian Shelf. The principal islands are about 300 mi (500 km) east of South America's southern Patagonian coast and 752 mi (1,210 km) from Cape Dubouzet at the northern tip of the Antarctic Peninsula, at a latitude of about 52°S. The archipelago, with an area of 4,700 sq mi (12,000 km^{2}), comprises East Falkland, West Falkland, and 776 smaller islands. As a British Overseas Territory, the Falklands have internal self-governance, while the United Kingdom takes responsibility for their defence and foreign affairs. The capital and largest settlement is Stanley on East Falkland.

The islands are believed to have been uninhabited prior to European discovery in the 17th century. Controversy exists over the Falklands' discovery and subsequent colonisation by Europeans. At various times, the islands have had French, British, Spanish, and Argentine settlements. Britain reasserted its rule in 1833, but Argentina maintains its claim to the islands. In April 1982, Argentine military forces invaded the islands. British administration was restored two months later at the end of the Falklands War. In a 2013 sovereignty referendum, almost all of the votes cast were in favour of remaining a UK overseas territory. The territory's sovereignty status is part of an ongoing dispute between Argentina and the UK.

The 2021 census recorded a population of 3,662 inhabitants, around 30% of which are temporary residents, on short-term work visas or working at the RAF Mount Pleasant military base. English is the official and predominant language. Under the British Nationality (Falkland Islands) Act 1983, Falkland Islanders are British citizens.

The islands lie at the boundary of the subantarctic oceanic and tundra climate zones, and both major islands have mountain ranges reaching 2,300 ft (700 m). They are home to large bird populations, although many no longer breed on the main islands owing to predation by introduced species. Major economic activities include fishing, tourism, and sheep farming, with an emphasis on high-quality wool exports. Oil exploration, licensed by the Falkland Islands Government, remains controversial as a result of maritime disputes with Argentina.

== Etymology ==
The name Falkland Islands comes from Falkland Sound, the strait that separates the two main islands. The name Falkland was applied to the channel by John Strong, captain of an English expedition that landed on the islands in 1690. Strong named the strait in honour of Anthony Cary, 5th Viscount Falkland, the Treasurer of the Navy who sponsored his journey. The Viscount's title originates from the town of Falkland, Scotland—the town's name probably comes from a Gaelic term referring to an enclosure (lann), (Note: According to researcher Simon Taylor, the exact Gaelic etymology is unclear as the falk in the name could have stood for 'hidden' (falach), 'wash' (failc), or 'heavy rain' (falc).) but it could less plausibly be from the Anglo-Saxon term folkland (land held by folk-right). The name Falklands was not applied to the islands until 1765, when British captain John Byron of the Royal Navy claimed them for King George III as "Falkland's Islands". The term Falklands is a standard abbreviation used to refer to the islands.

The common Spanish name for the archipelago, Islas Malvinas, derives from the French Îles Malouines—the name given to the islands by French explorer Louis-Antoine de Bougainville in 1764. Bougainville, who founded the islands' first settlement, named the area after the port of Saint-Malo (the point of departure for his ships and colonists). The port, located in the Brittany region of western France, was named after St. Malo (or Maclou), the Christian evangelist who founded the city.

In 1965, at the 20th session of the United Nations General Assembly, the Fourth Committee determined that, in all languages other than Spanish, all UN documentation would designate the territory as Falkland Islands (Malvinas). In Spanish, the territory was designated as Islas Malvinas (Falkland Islands). The nomenclature used by the United Nations for statistical processing purposes is Falkland Islands (Malvinas).

== History ==
Although Fuegians from Patagonia may have visited the Falkland Islands in prehistoric times, the islands were uninhabited when Europeans first explored them. European claims of discovery date back to the 16th century, but no consensus exists on whether early explorers sighted the Falklands or other islands in the South Atlantic. (Note: Based on his analysis of Falkland Islands discovery claims, historian John Dunmore concludes that "[a] number of countries could therefore lay some claim to the archipelago under the heading of first discoverers: Spain, Holland, Britain, and even Italy and Portugal – although the last two claimants might be stretching things a little.") The first undisputed landing on the islands is attributed to English captain John Strong, who, en route to Peru and Chile's littoral in 1690, explored the Falkland Sound and noted the islands' water and game.

The Falklands remained uninhabited until the 1764 establishment of Port Louis on East Falkland by French captain Louis Antoine de Bougainville and the 1765 foundation of Port Egmont on Saunders Island by British captain John Byron; the latter settlement being expanded by British captain John MacBride a year later. (Note: In 1764, Bougainville claimed the islands in the name of King Louis XV of France. In 1765, British captain John Byron claimed the islands in the name of King George III of Great Britain.) Whether or not the settlements were aware of each other's existence is debated by historians. In 1766, France surrendered its claim on the Falklands to Spain, which renamed the French colony Puerto Soledad the following year. Problems began when Spain detected and captured Port Egmont in 1770. War was narrowly avoided by its restitution to Britain in 1771.

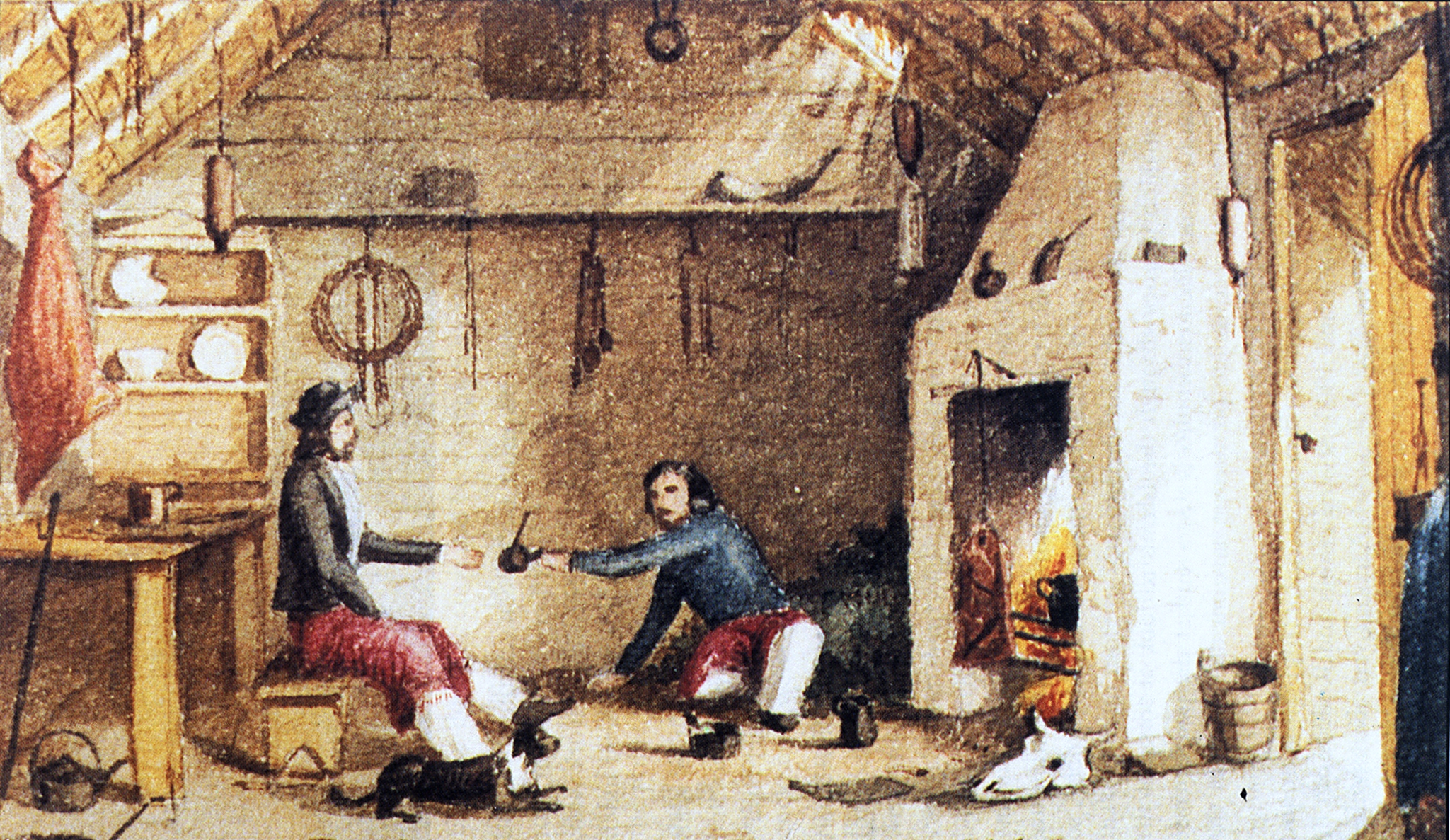
Gauchos drinking mate at a salting plant in Valle Esperanza, located in the centre of East Falkland in the 1850s.

The British and Spanish settlements coexisted in the archipelago until 1774, when Britain's new economic and strategic considerations led it to withdraw the garrison from the islands, leaving a plaque claiming the Falklands for King George III. Spain's Viceroyalty of the Río de la Plata became the only formal presence in the territory. West Falkland was left abandoned, and Puerto Soledad became a penal colony. Amid the British invasions of the Río de la Plata during the Napoleonic Wars in Europe, the islands' governor evacuated the archipelago in 1806; Spain's remaining colonial garrison followed suit in 1811, except for gauchos and fishermen who remained voluntarily.

Thereafter, the archipelago was visited only by fishing ships; its political status was undisputed until 1820, when Colonel David Jewett, an American privateer working for the United Provinces of the Río de la Plata, informed anchored ships about Buenos Aires' 1816 claim to Spain's territories in the South Atlantic. (Note: According to Argentine legal analyst Roberto Laver, the United Kingdom disregards Jewett's actions because the government he represented "was not recognised either by Britain or any other foreign power at the time" and "no act of occupation followed the ceremony of claiming possession".) Since the islands had no permanent inhabitants, in 1823 Buenos Aires granted German-born merchant Luis Vernet permission to conduct fishing activities and exploit feral cattle in the archipelago. (Note: Before leaving for the Falklands Vernet stamped his grant at the British Consulate, repeating this when Buenos Aires extended his grant in 1828. The cordial relationship between the consulate and Vernet led him to express "the wish that, in the event of the British returning to the islands, HMG would take his settlement under their protection".) Vernet settled at the ruins of Puerto Soledad in 1826, and accumulated resources on the islands until the venture was secure enough to bring settlers and form a permanent colony. Buenos Aires named Vernet military and civil commander of the islands in 1829, and he attempted to regulate sealing to stop the activities of foreign whalers and sealers. Vernet's venture lasted until a dispute related to fishing and hunting rights led to a raid by the American warship USS Lexington in 1831, (Note: The log of the "Lexington" only reports the destruction of arms and a powder store, but Vernet made a claim for compensation from the US Government stating that the entire settlement was destroyed.) when United States Navy commander Silas Duncan declared the dissolution of the island's government.

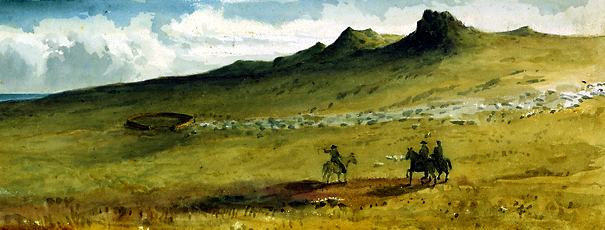
Depiction of a Falklands corral, shepherds and sheep in 1849 (painting by Royal Navy Admiral Edward Fanshawe)

Buenos Aires attempted to gain influence over the settlement by installing a garrison in October 1832, which mutinied within a month and was followed the next year by the arrival of British forces, who reasserted Britain's rule. The Argentine Confederation (headed by Buenos Aires Governor Juan Manuel de Rosas) protested against Britain's actions, (Note: As discussed by Roberto Laver, not only did Rosas not break relations with Britain because of the "essential" nature of "British economic support", but he offered the Falklands "as a bargaining chip ... in exchange for the cancellation of Argentina's million-pound debt with the British bank of Baring Brothers". In 1850, Rosas' government ratified the Arana–Southern Treaty, which put "an end to the existing differences, and of restoring perfect relations of friendship" between the United Kingdom and Argentina.) and Argentine governments have continued since then to register official protests against Britain. (Note: Argentina protested in 1841, 1849, 1884, 1888, 1908, 1927 and 1933, and has made annual protests to the United Nations since 1946.) The British troops departed after completing their mission, leaving the area without formal government. Vernet's deputy, the Scotsman Matthew Brisbane, returned to the islands that year to restore the business, but his efforts ended after, amid unrest at Port Louis, gaucho Antonio Rivero led a group of dissatisfied individuals to murder Brisbane and the settlement's senior leaders; survivors hid in a cave on a nearby island until the British returned and restored order. In the late 1830s, an appeal was made to the Colonial Office in London by businessmen seeing potential profit, for organised settlement of the islands. In 1840, the Falklands became a Crown colony and Scottish settlers subsequently established an official pastoral community. Four years later, nearly everyone relocated to Port Jackson, considered a better location for the government, and merchant Samuel Lafone began a venture to encourage British colonisation.

Stanley, as Port Jackson was soon renamed, officially became the seat of government in 1845. Early in its history, Stanley had a negative reputation due to cargo-shipping losses; only in emergencies would ships rounding Cape Horn stop at the port. Nevertheless, the Falklands' geographic location proved ideal for ship repairs and the "Wrecking Trade", the business of selling and buying shipwrecks and their cargoes. Aside from this trade, commercial interest in the archipelago was minimal due to the low-value hides of the feral cattle roaming the pastures. Economic growth began only after the Falkland Islands Company, which bought out Lafone's failing enterprise in 1851, (Note: There were continual tensions with the colonial administration over Lafone's failure to establish any permanent settlers, and over the price of beef supplied to the settlement. Moreover, although his concession required Lafone to bring settlers from the UK, most of the settlers he brought were gauchos from Uruguay.) successfully introduced Cheviot sheep for wool farming, spurring other farms to follow suit. The high cost of importing materials, combined with the shortage of labour and consequent high wages, meant the ship repair trade became uncompetitive. After 1870 it declined as the replacement of sail ships by steamships was accelerated by the low cost of coal in South America; by 1914, with the opening of the Panama Canal, the trade effectively ended. In 1881, the Falkland Islands became financially independent of Britain. For more than a century, the Falkland Islands Company dominated the trade and employment of the archipelago; in addition, it owned most housing in Stanley, which greatly benefited from the wool trade with the UK.

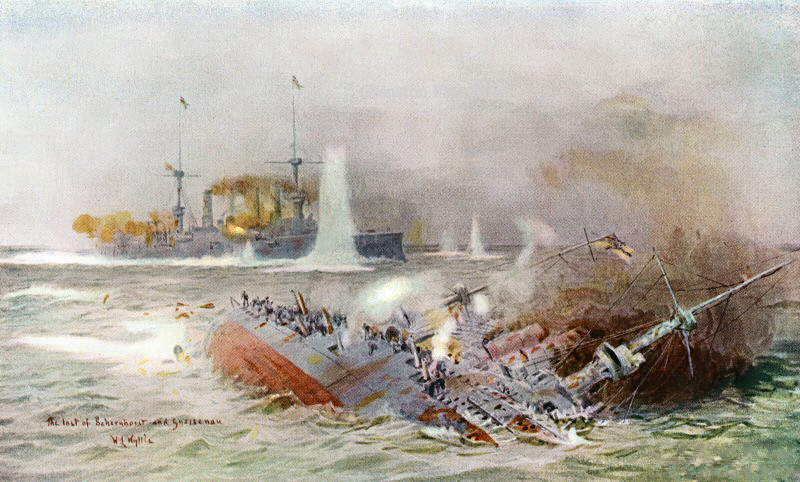
Depiction of the sinking of the Scharnhorst during the 1914 Battle of the Falkland Islands (painting by William Lionel Wyllie)

In the first half of the 20th century, the Falklands served an important role in Britain's territorial claims to subantarctic islands and a section of Antarctica. The Falklands governed these territories as the Falkland Islands Dependencies starting in 1908 and retained them until their dissolution in 1985. The Falklands also played a minor role in the two world wars as a military base aiding control of the South Atlantic. In the Battle of the Falkland Islands in December 1914 during the First World War, a Royal Navy fleet defeated an Imperial German squadron. In the Second World War, following the December 1939 Battle of the River Plate, the battle-damaged HMS Exeter steamed to the Falklands for repairs. In 1942, a battalion en route to India was redeployed to the Falklands as a garrison amid fears of a Japanese seizure of the archipelago. After the war ended, the Falklands economy was affected by declining wool prices and the political uncertainty resulting from the revived sovereignty dispute between the United Kingdom and Argentina.

Simmering tensions between the UK and Argentina increased during the second half of the century, when Argentine President Juan Perón asserted sovereignty over the archipelago. The sovereignty dispute intensified during the 1960s, shortly after the United Nations passed a resolution on decolonisation which Argentina interpreted as favourable to its position. In 1965, the UN General Assembly passed Resolution 2065, calling for both states to conduct bilateral negotiations to reach a peaceful settlement of the dispute. From 1966 until 1968, the UK confidentially discussed with Argentina the transfer of the Falklands, assuming its judgement would be accepted by the islanders. An agreement on trade ties between the archipelago and the mainland was reached in 1971 and, consequently, Argentina built a temporary airfield at Stanley in 1972. Nonetheless, Falklander dissent, as expressed by their strong lobby in the UK Parliament, and tensions between the UK and Argentina effectively limited sovereignty negotiations until 1977.

Concerned at the expense of maintaining the Falkland Islands in an era of budget cuts, the UK again considered transferring sovereignty to Argentina in the early Thatcher government. Substantive sovereignty talks again ended by 1981, and the dispute escalated with passing time. In April 1982 the Falklands War began when Argentine military forces invaded the Falklands and other British territories in the South Atlantic, briefly occupying them until a UK expeditionary force retook the territories in June. After the war the UK expanded its military presence, building RAF Mount Pleasant and increasing the size of its garrison. The war also left some 117 minefields containing nearly 20,000 mines of various types, including anti-vehicle and anti-personnel mines. Due to the large number of deminer casualties, initial attempts to clear the mines ceased in 1983. (Note: The minefields were fenced off and marked; there remain unexploded ordnance and improvised explosive devices. Detection and clearance of mines in the Falklands has proven difficult as some were air-delivered and not in marked fields; approximately 80% lie in sand or peat, where the position of mines can shift, making removal procedures difficult.) Landmine clearance work restarted in 2009, in accordance with the UK's obligations under the Ottawa Treaty, and Sapper Hill Corral was cleared of mines in 2012, allowing access to an important historical landmark for the first time in 30 years. Demining of the Falklands was completed in October 2020.

Based on Lord Shackleton's recommendations, the Falklands diversified from a sheep-based monoculture into an economy of tourism and, with the establishment of the Falklands exclusive economic zone, fisheries. (Note: In 1976, Lord Shackleton produced a report into the economic future of the islands; but his recommendations were not implemented because Britain sought to avoid confronting Argentina over sovereignty. Lord Shackleton was once again tasked, in 1982, to produce a report into the economic development of the islands. His new report criticised the large farming companies, and recommended transferring ownership of farms from absentee landlords to local landowners. Shackleton also suggested diversifying the economy into fishing, oil exploration, and tourism; moreover, he recommended the establishment of a road network, and conservation measures to preserve the islands' natural resources.) The road network was also made more extensive, and the construction of RAF Mount Pleasant allowed access to long haul flights. Oil exploration also began in the 2010s, with indications of possible commercially exploitable deposits in the Falklands basin. Argentina and the UK re-established diplomatic relations in 1990, but neither has agreed on the terms of future sovereignty discussions.

== Government ==
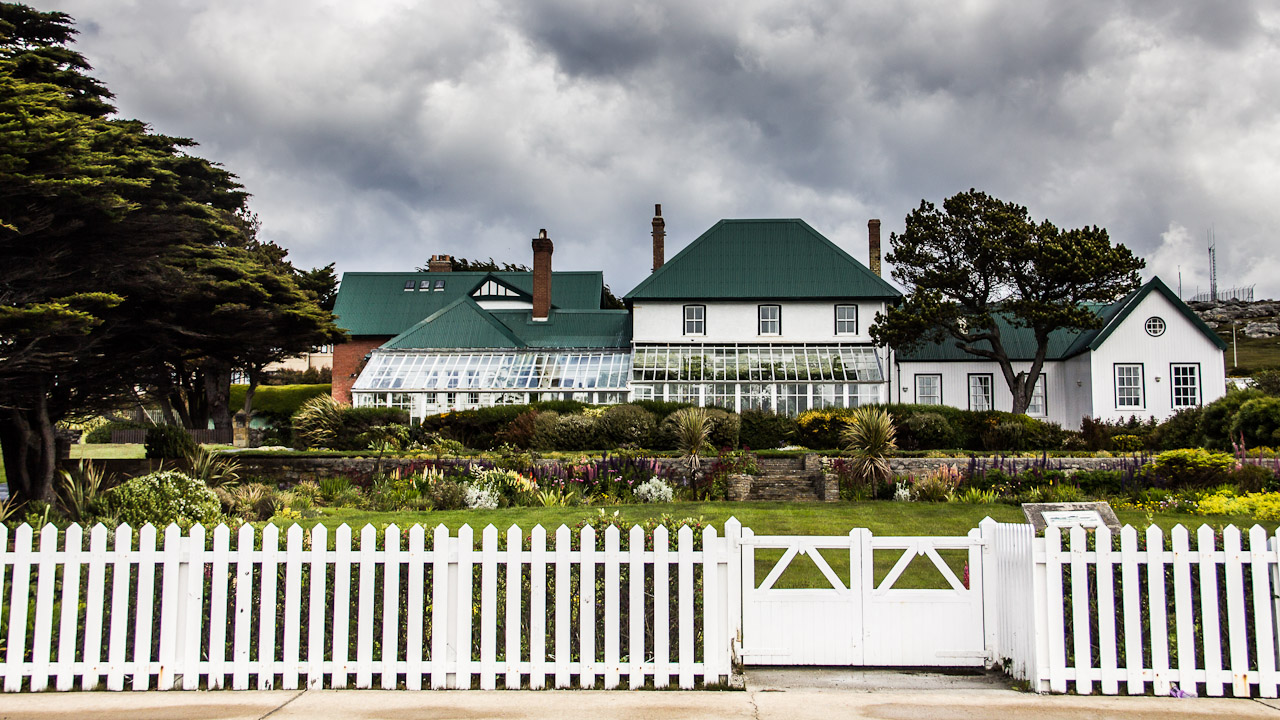
Government House in Stanley is the Governor's official residence.

The Falkland Islands are a self-governing British Overseas Territory. Under the 2009 Constitution, the islands have full internal self-government; the UK is responsible for foreign affairs, retaining the power "to protect UK interests and to ensure the overall good governance of the territory". The Monarch of the United Kingdom is the head of state, and executive authority is exercised on the monarch's behalf by the governor, who appoints the islands' chief executive on the advice of members of the Legislative Assembly. Both the governor and the chief executive serve as the head of government.

Governor Colin Martin-Reynolds was appointed in July 2025 and Chief Executive Andrea Clausen took up the post on 1 April 2025. Dr. Clausen is the first woman and the first Falkland Islander to become Chief Executive of the Government. The UK minister responsible for the Falkland Islands since 2024, Stephen Doughty, administers British foreign policy regarding the islands.

The governor acts on the advice of the islands' Executive Council, composed of the chief executive, the Director of Finance and three elected members of the Legislative Assembly (with the governor as chairman). The Legislative Assembly, a unicameral legislature, consists of the chief executive, the director of finance and eight members (five from Stanley and three from Camp) elected to four-year terms by universal suffrage. All politicians in the Falkland Islands are independent; no political parties exist on the islands. Since the 2013 general election, members of the Legislative Assembly have received a salary and are expected to work full-time and give up all previously held jobs or business interests.

As a territory of the United Kingdom, the Falklands were part of the overseas countries and territories of the European Union until 2020. The islands' judicial system, overseen by the Foreign and Commonwealth Office, is largely based on English law, and the constitution binds the territory to the principles of the European Convention on Human Rights. Residents have the right of appeal to the European Court of Human Rights and the Privy Council. Law enforcement is the responsibility of the Royal Falkland Islands Police (RFIP).

=== Defence ===
Defence of the islands is provided by the United Kingdom. A British military garrison is stationed on the islands, and the Falkland Islands government funds the Falkland Islands Defence Force, an additional platoon to company-sized light infantry. The Falklands claim an exclusive economic zone (EEZ) extending 200 nmi (370 km) from its coastal baselines, based on the United Nations Convention on the Law of the Sea; this zone overlaps with the EEZ of Argentina.

=== Sovereignty dispute ===
The UK and Argentina both assert sovereignty over the Falkland Islands. The UK bases its position on its continuous administration of the islands since 1833 and the islanders' "right to self-determination as set out in the UN Charter". Argentina claims that, when it achieved independence in 1816, it acquired the Falklands from Spain. The incident of 1833 is particularly contentious; Argentina considers it proof of "Britain's usurpation" whereas the UK discounts it as a mere reassertion of its claim. (Note: Argentina considers that, in 1833, the UK established an "illegal occupation" of the Falklands after expelling Argentine authorities and settlers from the islands with a threat of "greater force" and, afterwards, barring Argentines from resettling the islands. The Falkland Islands' government considers that only Argentina's military personnel was expelled in 1833, but its civilian settlers were "invited to stay" and did so except for 2 and their wives. International affairs scholar Lowell Gustafson considers that "[t]he use of force by the British on the Falkland Islands in 1833 was less dramatic than later Argentine rhetoric has suggested".)

In 2009, the British prime minister, Gordon Brown, had a meeting with the Argentine president, Cristina Fernández de Kirchner, and said that there would be no further talks over the sovereignty of the Falklands. In March 2013, the Falkland Islands held a referendum on its political status: 99.8% of votes cast favoured remaining a British overseas territory. Argentina does not recognise the Falkland Islanders as a partner in negotiations.

== Geography ==
Map of the Falkland Islands

The Falkland Islands have a land area of 4,700 sq mi (12,000 km^{2}) and a coastline estimated at 800 mi (1,300 km). The archipelago consists of two main islands, West Falkland and East Falkland, and 776 smaller islands. The islands are predominantly mountainous and hilly, with the major exception being the depressed plains of Lafonia (a peninsula forming the southern part of East Falkland). The Falklands consist of continental crust fragments resulting from the break-up of Gondwana and the opening of the South Atlantic that began 130 million years ago. The islands are located in the South Atlantic Ocean, on the Patagonian Shelf, about 300 mi (480 km) east of Patagonia in southern Argentina.

The Falklands' approximate location is latitude 51°40′– 53°00′ S and longitude 57°40′– 62°00′ W. The archipelago's two main islands are separated by the Falkland Sound, and its deep coastal indentations form natural harbours. East Falkland houses Stanley (the capital and largest settlement), the UK military base at RAF Mount Pleasant, and the archipelago's highest point: Mount Usborne, at 2,313 ft (705 m). Outside of these significant settlements is the area colloquially known as "Camp", which is derived from the Spanish term for countryside (Campo).

The climate of the islands is cold, windy, and humid maritime. Variability of daily weather is typical throughout the archipelago. Rainfall is common over half of the year, averaging 610 mm (24 in) in Stanley, and sporadic light snowfall occurs nearly all year. The temperature has historically stayed between 21.1 and −11.1 °C (70.0 and 12.0 °F) in Stanley, with mean monthly temperatures varying from 9 °C (48 °F) in January and February (summer) to −1 °C (30 °F) in July (winter). Strong westerly winds and cloudy skies are common. Although numerous storms are recorded each month, conditions are normally calm.

== Biodiversity ==
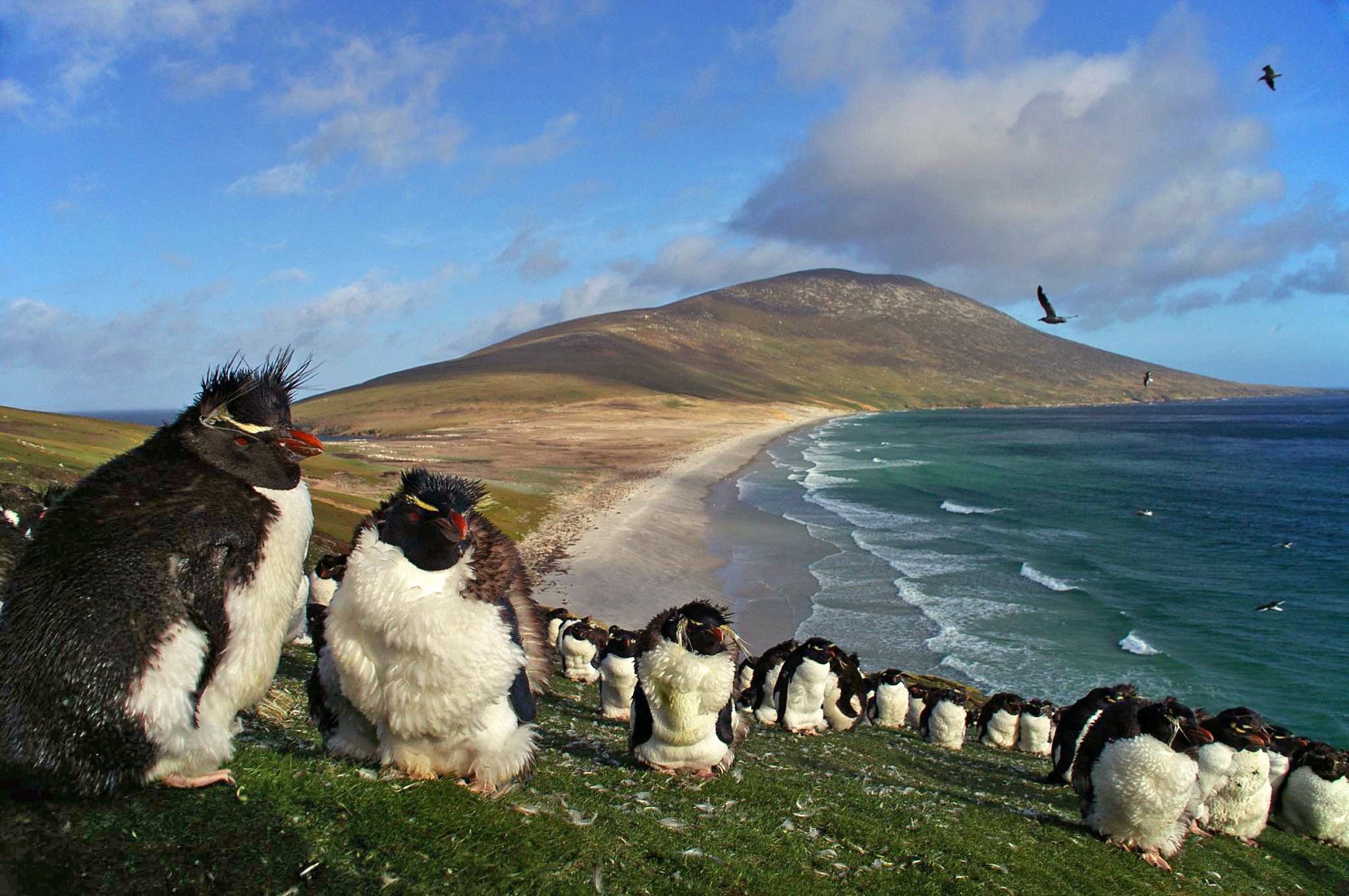
Colony of southern rockhopper penguins on Saunders Island

King penguins at Cowbay. By Koushik Ranjan Das.

The Falkland Islands are biogeographically part of the Antarctic zone, with strong connections to the flora and fauna of Patagonia in mainland South America. Land birds make up most of the Falklands' avifauna. The only endemic bird species on the Falkland Islands are the flightless Falkland steamer duck and Cobb's wren.

Magellan geese

Sixty-three species breed on the islands, including 14 endemic subspecies.

Turkey vulture at the rocky slope of Saunders Island

Abundant arthropod diversity occurs on the islands. The Falklands' flora consists of 163 native vascular plant species. More than 400 species of lichens and lichen-dwelling fungi have been recorded. The islands' only native terrestrial mammal, the warrah, was hunted to extinction by European settlers.

The islands are frequented by marine mammals, such as the southern elephant seal and the South American fur seal, and various types of cetaceans; offshore islands house the rare striated caracara.

Straited Caracara at Saunders Island.

There are also five different penguin species and a few of the largest albatross colonies on the planet.

Flight of an Albatross at Saunders Island.

Endemic fish around the islands are primarily from the genus Galaxias. The Falklands are treeless and have a wind-resistant vegetation predominantly composed of a variety of dwarf shrubs.

Virtually the entire land area of the islands is used as pasture for sheep. Introduced species include reindeer, hares, rabbits, Patagonian foxes, brown rats, and cats. Several of these species have harmed native flora and fauna, so the government has tried to contain, remove or exterminate foxes, rabbits and rats. Endemic land animals have been the most affected by introduced species, and several bird species have been extirpated from the larger islands. The extent of human impact on the Falklands is unclear, since there is little long-term data on habitat change.

== Economy ==
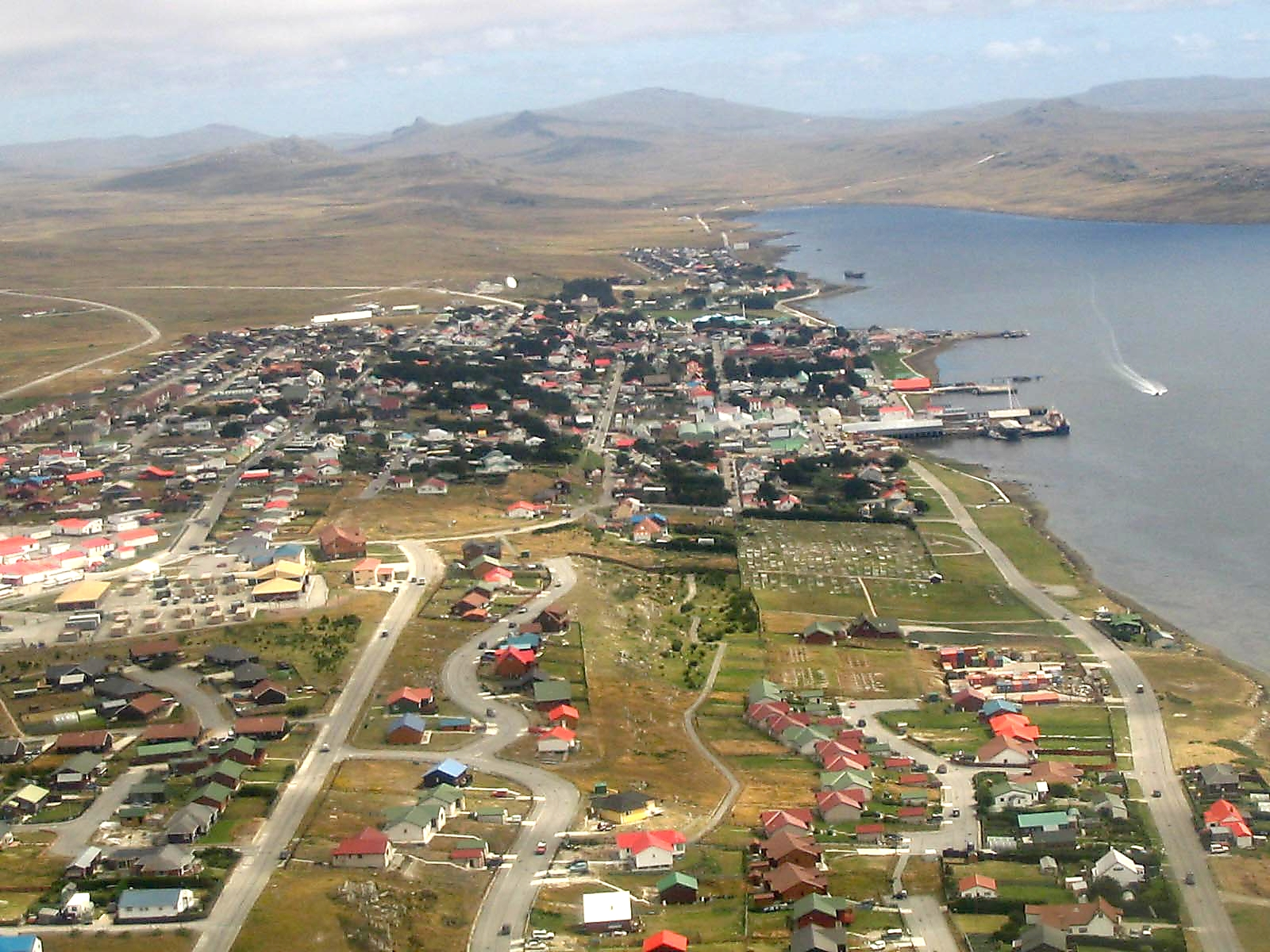
Stanley, now officially a city, is the financial centre of the Falkland Islands' economy.

As of 2023, the economy of the Falkland Islands is ranked the 221st largest out of 229 in the world by GDP (PPP), but ranks 10th worldwide by GDP (PPP) per capita. The unemployment rate was 1% in 2016, and inflation was calculated at 1.4% in 2014. Based on 2010 data, the islands have a high Human Development Index of 0.874 and a moderate Gini coefficient for income inequality of 34.17. The local currency is the Falkland Islands pound, which is pegged to the British pound sterling.

Economic development was advanced by ship resupplying and sheep farming for high-quality wool. The main sheep breeds in the Falkland Islands are Polwarth and Corriedale. During the 1980s, although ranch under-investment and the use of synthetic fibres damaged the sheep-farming sector, the government secured a major revenue stream by the establishment of an exclusive economic zone and the sale of fishing licences to "anybody wishing to fish within this zone". Since the end of the Falklands War in 1982, the islands' economic activity increasingly focused on oil field exploration and tourism. All large settlements are now connected by road and, since 2008, a ferry links West and East Falkland. The islands' major exports include wool, hides, venison, fish and squid; its main imports include fuel, building materials and clothing.

The port settlement of Stanley has regained the islands' economic focus, with an increase in population as workers migrate from Camp. Fear of dependence on fishing licences and threats from overfishing, illegal fishing and fish market price fluctuations led to increased interest in oil drilling as an alternative source of revenue. As of 2001, exploration efforts had yet to find "exploitable reserves". By 2023, oil exploration was still proceeding off the shelf of the islands with a deepwater project led by Rockhopper Exploration. Development projects in education and sports have been funded by the Falklands government, without aid from the United Kingdom.

In December 2025, it was indicated that, after prolonged consideration, Rockhopper Exploration and Navitas Petroleum had taken the final investment decisions for the development of Phase 1 of the Sea Lion Field and sanctioned the project. Phase 1, aims to produce 170 million barrels (27 million m^{3}) at a peak production of approximately 50,000 barrels per day (8 million litres per day). The first oil from Phase 1 was planned for 2028. Argentina immediately rejected these plans with the Argentine foreign ministry stating that Argentina would: “deepen its action plan to adopt all additional measures, in accordance with international law, that it deems necessary to safeguard its sovereign rights and interests.”

The primary sector of the economy accounts for most of the Falkland Islands' gross domestic product, with the fishing industry alone contributing between 50% and 60% of annual GDP; agriculture also contributes significantly to GDP and employs about a tenth of the population. A little over a quarter of the workforce serves the Falkland Islands government, making it the archipelago's largest employer. Tourism, part of the service economy, has been spurred by increased interest in Antarctic exploration and the creation of direct air links with the United Kingdom and South America. Tourists, mostly cruise ship passengers, are attracted by the archipelago's wildlife and environment, as well as activities such as fishing and wreck diving; the majority find accommodation in Stanley. The main international airport, located at RAF Mount Pleasant on East Falkland, provides flights to RAF Brize Norton in the UK and mainland South America. Port Stanley Airport provides internal flights. Despite COVID-19 pandemic restrictions causing suspensions of flights from Santiago and São Paulo and prohibiting cruise ship tourism, the economy of the islands remained stable and healthy.

== Demographics ==
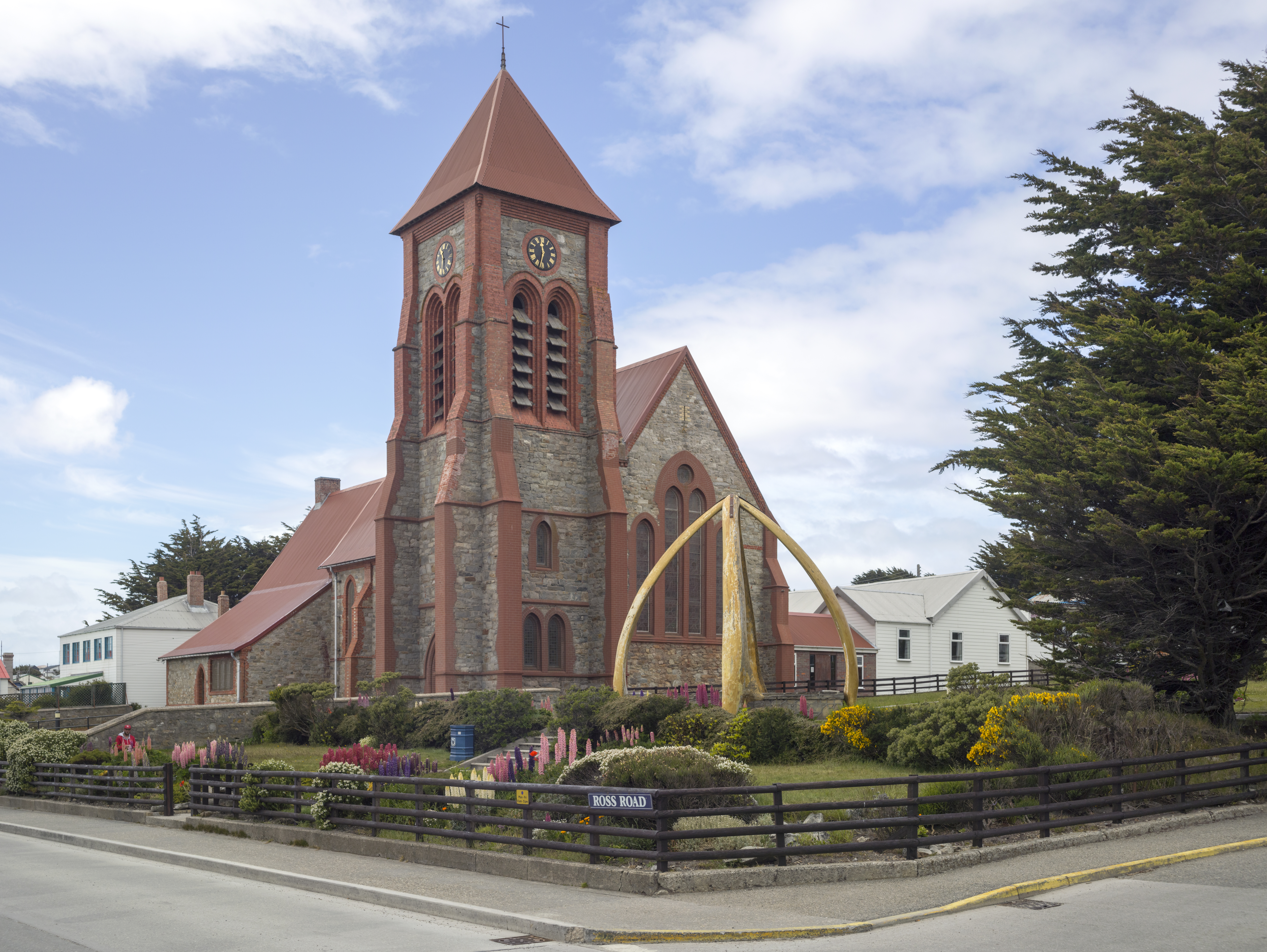
Christ Church Cathedral, the local parish church of the Anglican Communion. Most Falklanders identify as Christian.

The Falkland Islands population is homogeneous, mostly descended from Scottish and Welsh immigrants who settled in the territory after 1833, and also from English and French people, Gibraltarians, Scandinavians, and South Americans. The 2016 census indicated that 43% of residents were born in the archipelago, with foreign-born residents assimilated into local culture. The legal term for the right of residence is "belonging to the islands". In 1983, full British citizenship was given to Falkland Islanders under the British Nationality (Falkland Islands) Act 1983.

A significant population decline affected the archipelago in the 20th century, with many young islanders moving overseas in search of education, a modern lifestyle, and better job opportunities, particularly to the British city of Southampton, which came to be known in the islands as "Stanley North". In recent years, the islands' population decline has reduced, thanks to immigrants from the United Kingdom, Saint Helena, and Chile. In the 2012 census, a majority of residents listed their nationality as Falkland Islander (59 per cent), followed by British (29 per cent), Saint Helenian (9.8 per cent), and Chilean (5.4 per cent). A small number of Argentines also live on the islands.

The Falkland Islands have a very low population density. According to the 2012 census, the average daily population of the Falklands was 2,932, excluding military personnel serving in the archipelago and their dependents. (Note: At the time of the 2012 census, 91 Falklands residents were overseas.) A 2012 report counted 1,300 uniformed personnel and 50 British Ministry of Defence civil servants present in the Falklands. Stanley (with 2,121 residents) is the most populous location on the archipelago, followed by Mount Pleasant (369 residents, primarily air-base contractors) and Camp (351 residents). The islands' age distribution is skewed towards working age (20–60). Males outnumber females (53 to 47 per cent), and this discrepancy is most prominent in the 20–60 age group.

In the 2012 census, most islanders identified themselves as Christian (66 per cent), followed by those with no religious affiliation (32 per cent). The remaining 2 per cent identified as adherents of other religions, including the Baháʼí Faith, Buddhism, and Islam. The main Christian denominations are Anglicanism and other Protestantism, and Roman Catholicism.

== Education ==
Education in the Falkland Islands follows England's system and is free and compulsory for residents aged between 5 and 16 years. Primary education is available at Stanley, RAF Mount Pleasant (for children of service personnel) and a number of rural settlements. Secondary education is only available in Stanley, which offers boarding facilities and 12 subjects to General Certificate of Secondary Education (GCSE) level. Students aged 16 or older may study at colleges in England for their GCE Advanced Level or vocational qualifications. The Falkland Islands government pays for older students to attend institutions of higher education, usually in the United Kingdom.

== Culture ==
Falklands culture is based on the cultural traditions of its British settlers but has also been influenced by Hispanic South America. Falklanders still use some terms and place names from the former Gaucho inhabitants. The Falklands' predominant and official language is English, with the foremost dialect being Falkland Islands English; nonetheless, some inhabitants also speak Spanish. According to naturalist Will Wagstaff, "the Falkland Islands are a very social place, and stopping for a chat is a way of life".

The islands have one weekly newspaper, The Penguin News, and television and radio broadcasts generally feature programming from the United Kingdom. Wagstaff describes the local cuisine as "very British in character with much use made of the home-grown vegetables, local lamb, mutton, beef, and fish". Common between meals are "homemade cakes and biscuits with tea or coffee". Social activities are, according to Wagstaff, "typical of that of a small British town with a variety of clubs and organisations covering many aspects of community life".

=== Sport ===
Despite its small size, the Falkland Islands competes in the Commonwealth Games and Island Games. The Falkland Islands national cricket team is a member of the International Cricket Council.

== See also ==
- Index of Falkland Islands–related articles
- List of islands of the Falkland Islands
- List of settlements in the Falkland Islands
- Outline of the Falkland Islands
- 2025 Falkland Islands general election

== Bibliography ==
- Aldrich, Robert; Connell, John (1998). The Last Colonies. New York: Cambridge University Press. ISBN 978-0-521-41461-6.
- Avakov, Alexander (2013). Quality of Life, Balance of Powers, and Nuclear Weapons. New York: Algora Publishing. ISBN 978-0-87586-963-6.
- Balmaceda, Daniel (2011). Historias Inesperadas de la Historia Argentina (in Spanish). Buenos Aires: Editorial Sudamericana. ISBN 978-950-07-3390-8.
- Bell, Brian (2007). "Introduced Species". In Beau Riffenburgh (ed.). Encyclopedia of the Antarctic. Vol. 1. New York: Routledge. ISBN 978-0-415-97024-2.
- Bernhardson, Wayne (2011). Patagonia: Including the Falkland Islands. Altona, Manitoba: Friesens. ISBN 978-1-59880-965-7.
- Bertram, Esther; Muir, Shona; Stonehouse, Bernard (2007). "Gateway Ports in the Development of Antarctic Tourism". Prospects for Polar Tourism. Oxon, England: CAB International. ISBN 978-1-84593-247-3.
- Blouet, Brian; Blouet, Olwyn (2009). Latin America and the Caribbean. Hoboken, New Jersey: John Wiley and Sons. ISBN 978-0-470-38773-3.
- Buckman, Robert (2012). Latin America 2012. Ranson, West Virginia: Stryker-Post Publications. ISBN 978-1-61048-887-7.
- Cahill, Kevin (2010). Who Owns the World: The Surprising Truth About Every Piece of Land on the Planet. New York: Grand Central Publishing. ISBN 978-0-446-55139-7.
- Calvert, Peter (2004). A Political and Economic Dictionary of Latin America. London: Europa Publications. ISBN 978-0-203-40378-5.
- Carafano, James Jay (2005). "Falkland/Malvinas Islands". In Will Kaufman; Heidi Slettedahl Macpherson (eds.). Britain and the Americas: Culture, Politics, and History. Santa Barbara, California: ABC–CLIO. ISBN 978-1-85109-431-8.
- Cawkell, Mary (2001). The History of the Falkland Islands. Oswestry, England: Anthony Nelson Ltd. ISBN 978-0-904614-55-8.
- Central Intelligence Agency (2011). The CIA World Factbook 2012. New York: Skyhorse Publishing, Inc. ISBN 978-1-61608-332-8.
- Clark, Malcolm; Dingwall, Paul (1985). Conservation of Islands in the Southern Ocean. Cambridge, England: IUCN. ISBN 978-2-88032-503-9.
- Day, David (2013). Antarctica: A Biography (Reprint ed.). Oxford, England: Oxford University Press. ISBN 978-0-19-967055-0.
- Dotan, Yossi (2010). Watercraft on World Coins: America and Asia, 1800–2008. Vol. 2. Portland, Oregon: The Alpha Press. ISBN 978-1-898595-50-2.
- Dunmore, John (2005). Storms and Dreams. Auckland, New Zealand: Exisle Publishing Limited. ISBN 978-0-908988-57-0.
- Foreign Office (1961). Report on the Proceedings of the General Assembly of the United Nations. London: H.M. Stationery Office.
- Gibran, Daniel (1998). The Falklands War: Britain Versus the Past in the South Atlantic. Jefferson, North Carolina: McFarland & Company, Inc. ISBN 978-0-7864-0406-3.
- Goebel, Julius (1971) [1927]. The Struggle for the Falkland Islands: A Study in Legal and Diplomatic History. Port Washington, New York: Kennikat Press. ISBN 978-0-8046-1390-3.
- Graham-Yooll, Andrew (2002). Imperial Skirmishes: War and Gunboat Diplomacy in Latin America. Oxford, England: Signal Books Limited. ISBN 978-1-902669-21-2.
- Guo, Rongxing (2007). Territorial Disputes and Resource Management. New York: Nova Science Publishers, Inc. ISBN 978-1-60021-445-5.
- Gustafson, Lowell (1988). The Sovereignty Dispute Over the Falkland (Malvinas) Islands. New York: Oxford University Press. ISBN 978-0-19-504184-2.
- Haddelsey, Stephen; Carroll, Alan (2014). Operation Tabarin: Britain's Secret Wartime Expedition to Antarctica 1944–46. Stroud, England: The History Press. ISBN 978-0-7509-5511-9.
- Headland, Robert (1989). Chronological List of Antarctic Expeditions and Related Historical Events. New York: Cambridge University Press. ISBN 978-0-521-30903-5.
- Heawood, Edward (2011). F. H. H. Guillemard (ed.). A History of Geographical Discovery in the Seventeenth and Eighteenth Centuries (Reprint ed.). New York: Cambridge University Press. ISBN 978-1-107-60049-2.
- Hemmerle, Oliver Benjamin (2005). "Falkland Islands". In R. W. McColl (ed.). Encyclopedia of World Geography. Vol. 1. New York: Golson Books, Ltd. ISBN 978-0-8160-5786-3.
- Hertslet, Lewis (1851). A Complete Collection of the Treaties and Conventions, and Reciprocal Regulations, At Present Subsisting Between Great Britain and Foreign Powers, and of the Laws, Decrees, and Orders in Council, Concerning the Same. Vol. 8. London: Harrison and Son.
- Hince, Bernadette (2001). The Antarctic Dictionary. Collingwood, Melbourne: CSIRO Publishing. ISBN 978-0-9577471-1-1.
- Jones, Roger (2009). What's Who? A Dictionary of Things Named After People and the People They are Named After. Leicester, England: Matador. ISBN 978-1-84876-047-9.
- Jónsdóttir, Ingibjörg (2007). "Botany during the Swedish Antarctic Expedition 1901–1903". In Jorge Rabassa; Maria Laura Borla (eds.). Antarctic Peninsula and Tierra del Fuego. Leiden, Netherlands: Taylor & Francis. ISBN 978-0-415-41379-4.
- Klügel, Andreas (2009). "Atlantic Region". In Rosemary Gillespie; David Clague (eds.). Encyclopedia of Islands. Berkeley: University of California Press. ISBN 978-0-520-25649-1.
- Lansford, Tom (2012). Thomas Muller; Judith Isacoff; Tom Lansford (eds.). Political Handbook of the World 2012. Los Angeles, California: CQ Press. ISBN 978-1-60871-995-2.
- Laver, Roberto (2001). The Falklands/Malvinas Case. The Hague: Martinus Nijhoff Publishers. ISBN 978-90-411-1534-8.
- Marley, David (2008). Wars of the Americas (2nd ed.). Santa Barbara, California: ABC-CLIO. ISBN 978-1-59884-100-8.
- Minahan, James (2013). Ethnic Groups of the Americas. Santa Barbara, California: ABC-CLIO. ISBN 978-1-61069-163-5.
- Paine, Lincoln (2000). Ships of Discovery and Exploration. New York: Mariner Books. ISBN 978-0-395-98415-4.
- Pascoe, Graham; Pepper, Peter (2008). "Luis Vernet". In David Tatham (ed.). The Dictionary of Falklands Biography (Including South Georgia): From Discovery Up to 1981. Ledbury, England: David Tatham. ISBN 978-0-9558985-0-1.
- Peterson, Harold (1964). Argentina and the United States 1810–1960. New York: University Publishers Inc. ISBN 978-0-87395-010-7.
- Prideaux, Bruce (2008). "Falkland Islands". In Michael Lück (ed.). The Encyclopedia of Tourism and Recreation in Marine Environments. Oxon, England: CAB International. ISBN 978-1-84593-350-0.
- Reginald, Robert; Elliot, Jeffrey (1983). Tempest in a Teapot: The Falkland Islands War. Wheeling, Illinois: Whitehall Co. ISBN 978-0-89370-267-0.
- Room, Adrian (2006). Placenames of the World (2nd ed.). Jefferson, North Carolina: McFarland & Company, Inc. ISBN 978-0-7864-2248-7.
- Royle, Stephen (2001). A Geography of Islands: Small Island Insularity. New York: Routledge. ISBN 978-0-203-16036-7.
- Royle, Stephen (2006). "The Falkland Islands". In Godfrey Baldacchino (ed.). Extreme Tourism: Lessons from the World's Cold Water Islands. Amsterdam: Elsevier. ISBN 978-0-08-044656-1.
- Sainato, Vincenzo (2010). "Falkland Islands". In Graeme Newman; Janet Stamatel; Hang-en Sung (eds.). Crime and Punishment around the World. Vol. 2. Santa Barbara, California: ABC-CLIO. ISBN 978-0-313-35133-4.
- Segal, Gerald (1991). The World Affairs Companion. New York: Simon & Schuster/Touchstone. ISBN 978-0-671-74157-0.
- Sicker, Martin (2002). The Geopolitics of Security in the Americas. Westport, Connecticut: Praeger Publishers. ISBN 978-0-275-97255-4.
- Strange, Ian (1987). The Falkland Islands and Their Natural History. Newton Abbot, England: David & Charles. ISBN 978-0-7153-8833-4.
- Taylor, Simon; Márkus, Gilbert (2005). The Place-Names of Fife: Central Fife between the Rivers Leven and Eden. Donington, England: Shaun Tyas. ISBN 978-1900289-93-1.
- Thomas, David (1991). "The View from Whitehall". In Wayne Smith (ed.). Toward Resolution? The Falklands/Malvinas Dispute. Boulder, Colorado: Lynne Rienner Publishers. ISBN 978-1-55587-265-6.
- Trewby, Mary (2002). Antarctica: An Encyclopedia from Abbott Ice Shelf to Zooplankton. Richmond Hill, Ontario: Firefly Books. ISBN 978-1-55297-590-9.
- Wagstaff, William (2001). Falkland Islands: The Bradt Travel Guide. Buckinghamshire, England: Bradt Travel Guides, Ltd. ISBN 978-1-84162-037-4.
- Zepeda, Alexis (2005). "Argentina". In Will Kaufman; Heidi Slettedahl Macpherson (eds.). Britain and the Americas: Culture, Politics, and History. Santa Barbara, California: ABC–CLIO. ISBN 978-1-85109-431-8.
