= Transport in the Falkland Islands =

The Falkland Islands currently have three primary means of transport – road, sea and air. However, in 1946, when Sir Miles Clifford arrived as governor, there were no air services, no roads outside Stanley and an indifferent sea service. Sir Miles was instrumental in starting the Falkland Islands Government Air Service in December 1948. The inaugural flight involved a mercy flight from North Arm Settlement to Stanley to bring a girl with peritonitis to life-saving medical help in Stanley. There is now an international airport, a domestic airport, a number of airstrips, a growing road network and a much-improved ferry service between the two main islands.

== Road ==
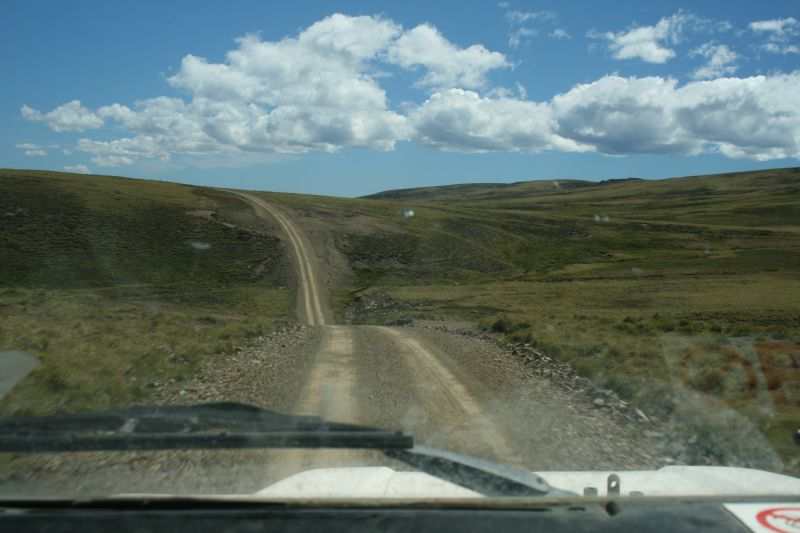
Typical Falkland Islands road

In 1982, the Falkland Islands had no roads outside Stanley, only tracks. By 2007, the Falkland Islands had a road network of 488 miles (786 km) with further roads planned for construction to link all occupied mainland settlements by 2013. In 2012, the Falkland Islands Government classified the 536 miles (862 km) road network – East Falkland 304 miles (489 km) and West Falkland 232 miles (373 km) – into "A" roads, "B" roads and "C" roads for purposes of Highways Asset Management Plan. The "A" roads are the 75 miles (121 km) link between Stanley and New Haven (East Falkland) and the 48 miles (78 km) link between Port Howard and Fox Bay (West Falkland). All roads within Stanley are asphalted as are the ones at Mount Pleasant Airport (MPA). The road between Stanley and MPA is mostly gravel all-weather roads (as like the rest of the roads in the islands) with some short asphalted sections. The road between Stanley and MPA has a large trench on either side, which will ground any vehicle driving into it. These trenches were allegedly dug deeper than they needed to be as annual rainfall was taken as a number for the monthly rainfall.

Stanley has two taxi services which can be used for travel within the town and the surrounding areas. A variety of four-wheel drive vehicles can be hired in Stanley, which are essential for travel along unpaved roads that are potentially badly potholed. A bus service ferries passengers between the main airport for international flights at Mount Pleasant and Stanley. Bicycles can also be hired, though because of the unsealed roads and hilly terrain, these are more suitable for use around the Stanley area.

Speed limits are 25 mph (40 km/h) in built-up areas and 40 mph (64 km/h) elsewhere.

== Sea ==
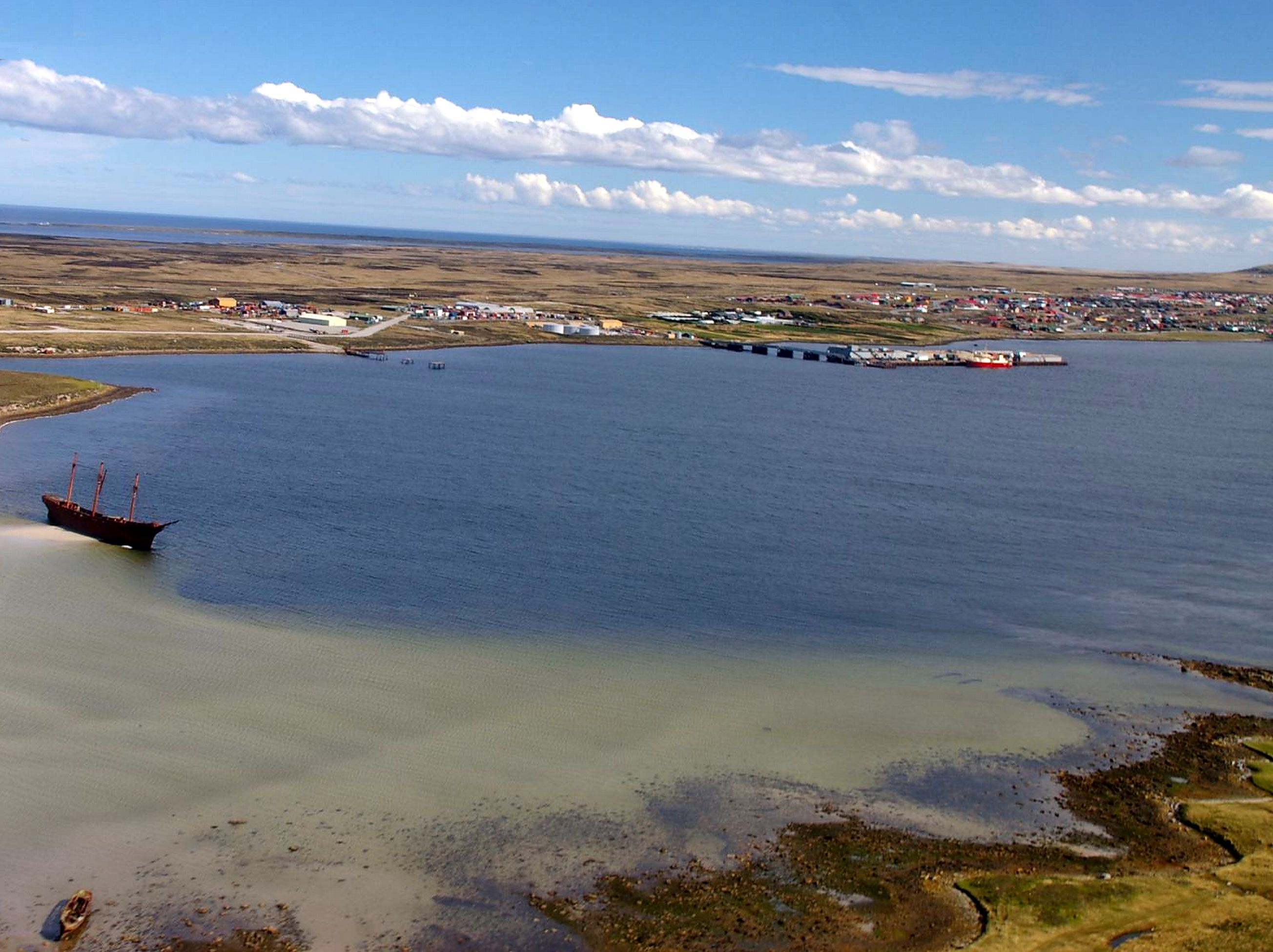
Stanley Harbour

There are two seaports in the Falkland Islands, Stanley (East Falkland) and Fox Bay (West Falkland). Additionally, British forces in the islands use a port facility at Mare Harbour. The designated harbours in Stanley area include Berkeley Sound, Port William and Stanley Harbour itself. Fox Bay is also a customs entry point for West Falkland. In 2020 the government awarded a contract to BAM Nuttall to design and build a new port for the Falklands. The Falkland Islands do not have a merchant navy.

Since November 2008, a regular ferry service has linked the two main islands, carrying cars, passengers and cargo. The ferry, MV Concordia Bay, a 42.45 m twin-screw shallow draft (2.59 m) landing craft runs between Port Howard in West Falkland and New Haven in East Falkland. She has a deck, 30 m in length and 10 m in width which is sufficient for 16 one-ton Land Rovers (or equivalent) and accommodation for 30 passengers. She also has a crane that is capable of lifting 10 tonnes at 7 m. She also visits some of the smaller islands.

Other smaller boats may be chartered in advance.

Tourist cruise ships often visit many of the islands, making use of inflatable boats where adequate docking facilities are not available.

== Rail ==
A 2-foot (610 mm) gauge railway, known as the Camber Railway, was built along the north side of Stanley Harbour in 1915-1916 and used until the 1920s. It was about 3.5 miles (5.6 km) long. The trackbed is still visible.

== Air ==
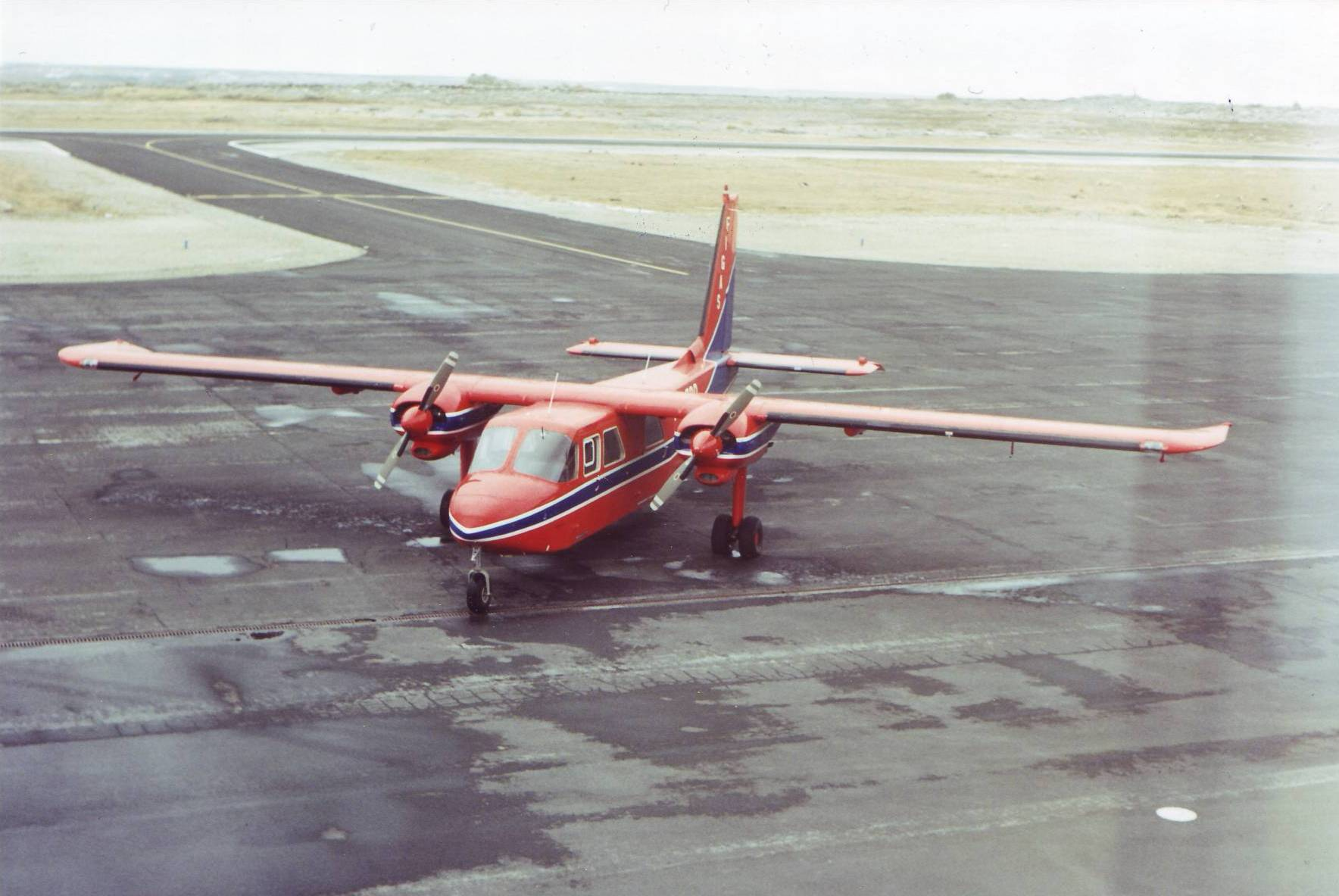
BN-2B Islander VP-FBD operated by the Falkland Islands Government Air Service, Stanley, 1994

The Falkland Islands have two airports with paved runways. The main international airport is RAF Mount Pleasant, 27 miles (43 km) west of Stanley. LATAM Airlines operate weekly flights to Punta Arenas. Once a month, this flight also stops in Río Gallegos, Argentina.

The Royal Air Force operates flights from RAF Mount Pleasant to RAF Brize Norton in Oxfordshire, England, with a refuelling stop at RAF Ascension Island. This service is called the South Atlantic Airbridge.

Bristow Helicopters also operate two Sikorsky S-92 helicopters, based at RAF Mount Pleasant, under contract to the United Kingdom Ministry of Defence, primarily for moving military personnel, equipment and supplies around the islands. Additionally, two AgustaWestland AW189 helicopters are operated from RAF Mount Pleasant by AAR Corp and Bristow in the search and rescue role.

A Britten-Norman Islander owned by FIGAS touching down at a landing strip on Sea Lion Island

The smaller Port Stanley Airport, outside the city, is used mainly for internal flights. The Falkland Islands Government Air Service (FIGAS) operates Islander aircraft that can use the grass airstrips that most settlements have. Flight schedules are decided a day in advance according to passenger needs and the next day's timetable is published every evening. The schedules are based on three routes - a Northern Shuttle and the Southern Shuttle that each have one flight a day and the East - West Shuttle that has a morning and an evening flight every day.

The British Antarctic Survey operates a transcontinental air link between Port Stanley Airport and the Rothera Research Station on the Antarctic Peninsula and servicing also other British bases in the British Antarctic Territory using a de Havilland Canada Dash 7.
