= Shag Cove =

Bay in the east of West Falkland

Coordinates: 51.596°S 59.569°W

Shag Cove is a bay in the east of West Falkland, between Mount Maria and Mount Moody on Falkland Sound.

During the Falklands War, two Pumas and an Agusta A109 Hirundo helicopters were destroyed by British GR3 Harrier jets here, when trying to extract the Argentine 601 Commando Company.
