= Pebble Island raid =

Military raid during the Falklands War

Coordinates: 51°18′32″S 59°36′37″W

- Part of the Falklands War
- Location of Pebble Island (in red), north of the West Falkland island.
Date	14–15 May 1982
Location	Pebble Island, Falkland Islands
Result	British victory

Belligerents
United Kingdom	Argentina

Strength
45 SAS troopers 1 naval gunfire observer 1 destroyer (HMS Glamorgan); 2 helicopters	150 troops

Casualties and losses
2 wounded	1 killed 11 aircraft destroyed

The raid on Pebble Island was a raid by British Special Forces on Pebble Island's airfield during the Falklands War. The raid on Pebble Island took place on the night of 14–15 May 1982. Pebble Island is one of the smaller Falkland Islands (4 miles across its widest point and just 40 square miles in total), lying north of West Falkland. The site was being used as a forward operating base for T-34 Mentor and Pucara aircraft by the Argentine Air Force; British Special Air Service (SAS) operatives were tasked with destroying the aircraft on the ground, in an operation that echoed back to some of the unit's first missions during the North African Campaign of World War II. SAS elements, then embarked on HMS Hermes, were tasked with eliminating the airfield, with naval support from the Type 22 frigate HMS Broadsword as Hermes defensive escort and the County-class destroyer HMS Glamorgan to provide naval gunfire support with its Mark 6 4.5 inch guns.

During the night of 14 May, three Westland Sea King HC4 helicopters of 846 Naval Air Squadron departed with 45 members of D Squadron, 22 SAS on board. The force infiltrated the airfield to lay charges on the aircraft, with their mortar teams and HMS Glamorgan providing distracting fire. The aircraft were attacked using thermite grenades wrapped in PE-4 explosives with 4 second fuses, the cockpit glass was broken and the charges were thrown inside. Five of the aircraft were destroyed in this manner, whilst the rest were damaged with small arms fire. Following this cue Glamorgan began shelling the Argentine positions on the airfield using high-explosive rounds, hitting the ammunition dump and fuel stores. The defending force did not engage until the entire raiding party had re-grouped and were preparing to move out. One British soldier was wounded by an Argentine improvised explosive device (IED) while the raiding party returned fire, resulting in the death of the Argentine commanding officer (according to British assessments) and the suppression of any defensive effort. The wounded man was hauled back to the recovery site with the raiding party reaching the aircraft by the required time for transportation back to Hermes before daybreak.

== Background ==
Immediately after the Argentinians had seized the Falkland Islands they established a small airbase, Aeródromo Auxiliar Calderón, on Pebble Island (Argentine name: Isla Borbón) using the local airstrip on which were based Argentine Air Force's FMA IA 58 Pucará and some Argentine Naval Aviation's T-34 Mentor light ground attack aircraft. Reconnaissance by these aircraft could have compromised the Royal Navy's manoeuvres before its intended landing on East Falkland.

SAS elements, then embarked on HMS Hermes, were tasked with eliminating the threat, with naval support from the Type 22 frigate HMS Broadsword as Hermes' defensive escort and the County class destroyer HMS Glamorgan to provide naval gunfire support with its Mark 6 4.5 inch guns. The Naval Gunfire Support Forward Observer (NGSFO) who was responsible for co-ordinating the naval gunfire support was Captain Chris Brown RA of 148 Battery 29 Commando Regiment Royal Artillery.

== Planning ==
=== Initial intentions ===
Initial intentions were for a squadron-strength air insertion from Hermes using personnel from D Squadron, 22 Regiment. The raiding party would destroy the deployed aircraft, radar site, ground crew, and force protection garrison before helicopter exfiltration to return to Hermes before daybreak.

=== Reconnaissance ===
Reconnaissance for the raid was conducted on 10 May by 8 members from the Boat Troop, D Squadron, who infiltrated by Klepper canoe. The patrol found that strong headwinds would increase the time taken to fly in from Hermes, delaying time on target and reducing the available offensive window to thirty minutes from the planned ninety. In light of this information, the planning emphasised the importance of destroying the aircraft as a priority, with support personnel as a secondary priority.

== The raid ==
During the night of 14 May, three Westland Sea King HC4 helicopters of 846 Naval Air Squadron departed with 45 members of D Squadron on board. The delivery point was 3.7 mi (6 km) from the airstrip on Pebble Island. Mountain Troop was tasked with the destruction of the Argentine aircraft, while the remaining personnel acted as a protection force, securing approaches to the airstrip, and forming an operational reserve.

The raiding party unloaded over 100 L16 81mm Mortar bombs, explosive charges, and Rocket 66mm HEAT L1A1 Light Anti-tank Weapons to carry into the engagement zone from the helicopters, with each man in the raiding party carrying at least two mortar bombs. For small arms, M16 rifles were used, some with underslung M203 grenade launchers. Approach navigation was conducted by a member of the Boat Troop who had carried out the reconnaissance.

=== Action ===
Post-raid photo taken from an RAF Harrier showing a T-34 Mentor and a Pucara on the airstrip

As the raiding party approached the target, they spotted a sentry but were not seen, allowing them to lay charges on seven of the aircraft. Once all the aircraft had been prepared, the raiding team opened fire on the aircraft with small arms and rockets. All of the aircraft were damaged, with some having their undercarriages shot away. Following this cue, Glamorgan began shelling the Argentine positions on the airfield using high-explosive rounds, hitting the ammunition dump and fuel stores.

The defending force did not engage until the entire raiding party had re-grouped and were preparing to move out. One British soldier was wounded by an Argentine IED. The raiding party returned fire using small arms and M203 grenade launchers, resulting in the death of the Argentine commanding officer (according to British assessments) and the suppression of any defensive effort.

The Argentine version states that their marines remained in shelters during the shelling by Glamorgan, so they were unable to face the SAS in combat. The British trooper's injury was the result of shrapnel from exploding charges planted by the Argentines under the airstrip in order to deny its use to the enemy. The blasts were triggered in the belief that the operation was a full-scale assault to take over the air base.

=== Exfiltration ===
The casualty was hauled back to the recovery site with the raiding party, who reached the aircraft in time for transportation back to Hermes before daybreak. The party decided to proceed with exfiltration instead of returning to attack the defending force.

== Aftermath ==
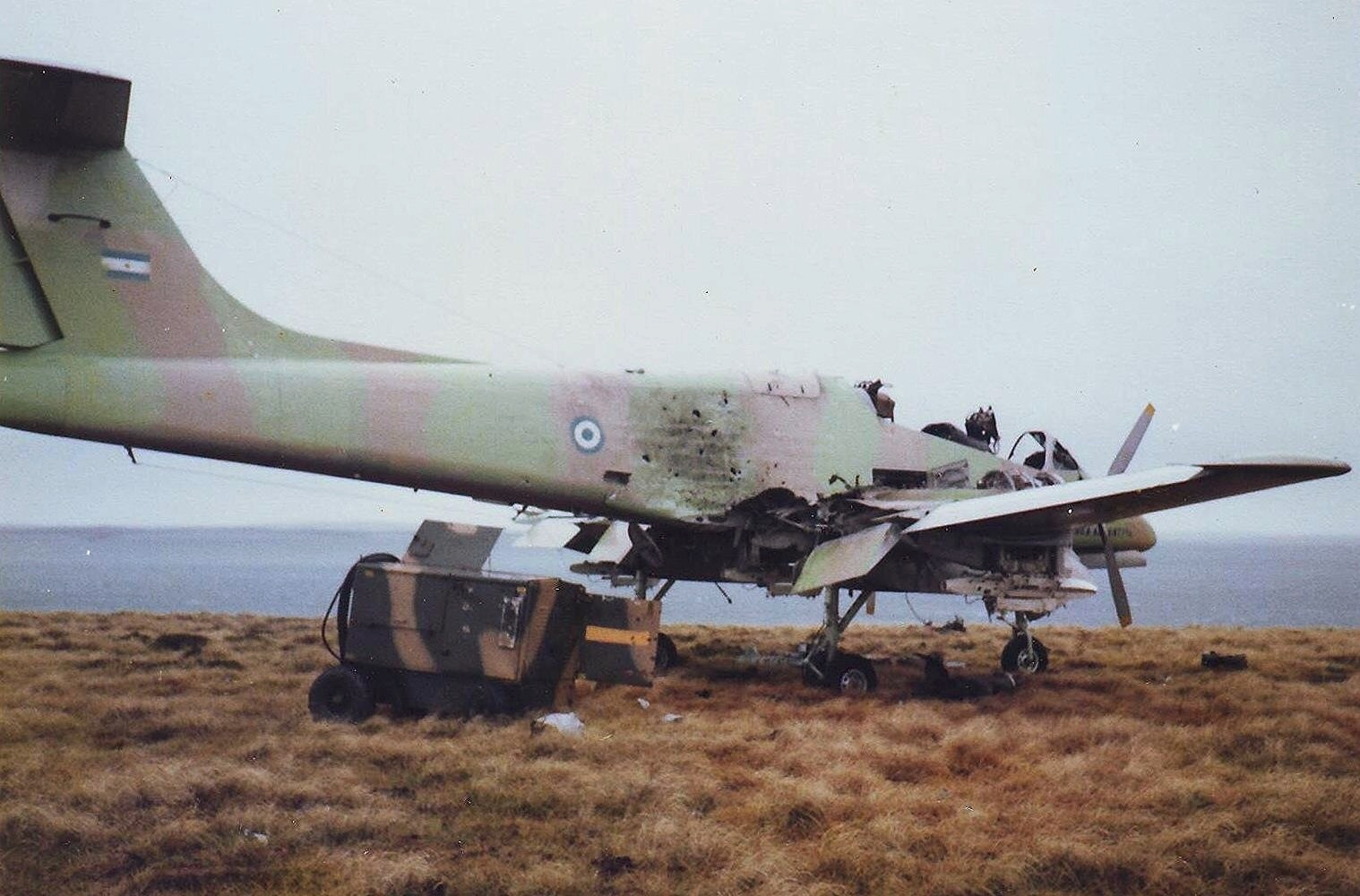
Damaged IA 58 "Pucará" at Pebble Island, 1982

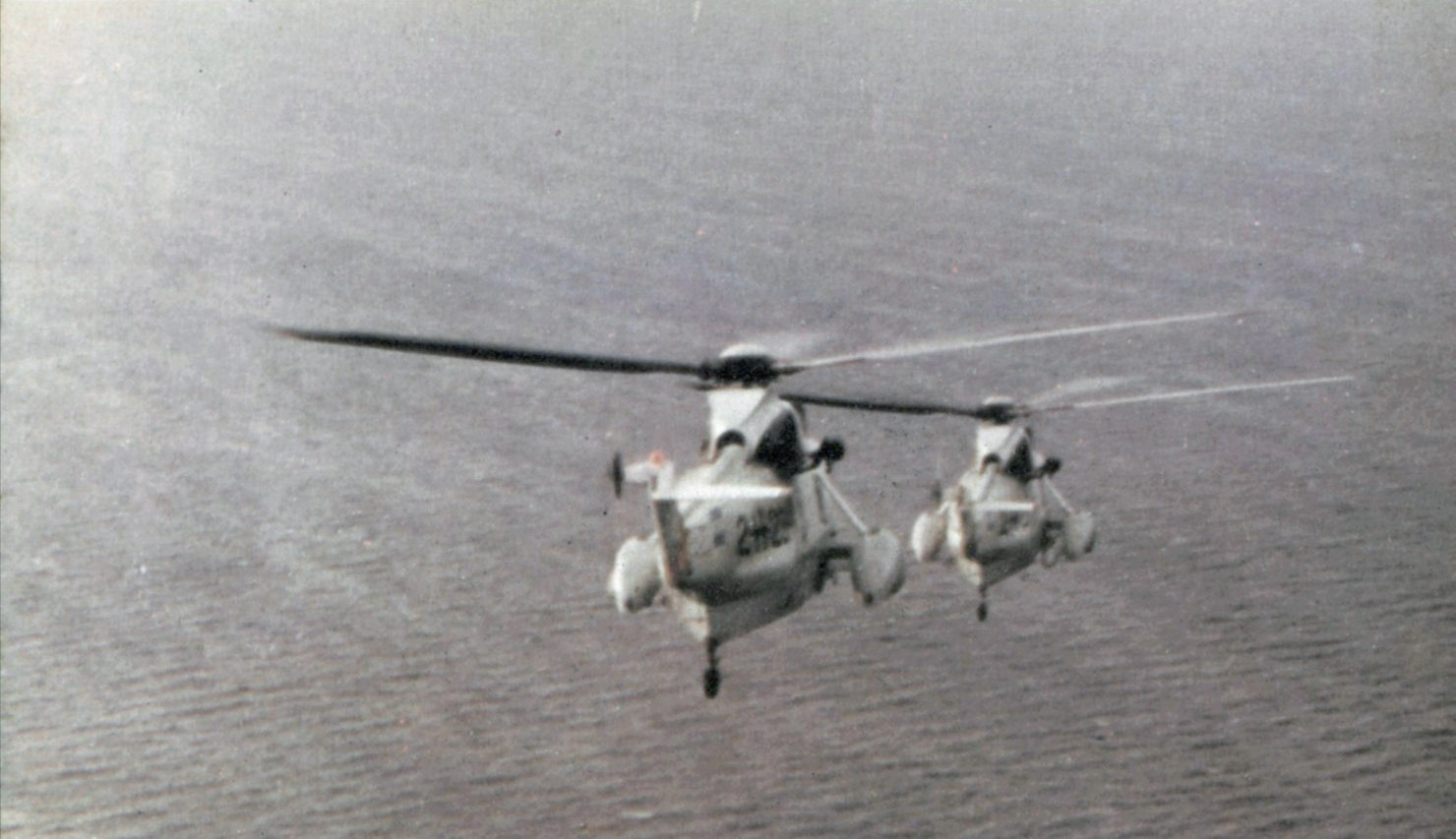
Argentine "Sea King" helicopters departing to rescue the troops at Pebble Island, June 1982

Assets destroyed during the raid totalled:

- Six FMA IA 58 Pucarás (Note: A-502, A-523, A-529, A-552, A-556) (Air Force)
- Four Turbo Mentor trainer/light attack aircraft (Navy)
- One Short SC.7 Skyvan utility transport aircraft (Coast Guard)
- The Pebble Island ammunition dump
- The Pebble Island fuel dump

The raid was considered a complete success, reminiscent of the type of operation carried out by the SAS in the Second World War. One of the officers involved, Captain Gavin Hamilton, was later killed at the Skirmish at Many Branch Point, near Port Howard. The Argentine forces continued occupying the position until they were evacuated later in the war. The troops were evacuated on 1 June 1982 by two Argentine Navy Sea King helicopters.

== See also ==
- Raid on Cortley Ridge
