= Gavin Hamilton (British Army officer) =

British Army officer

Gavin John Hamilton
- Born: 15 May 1953; Harrogate, Yorkshire
- Died: 10 June 1982 (aged 29); Many Branch Point, near Port Howard, Falkland Islands
- Burial place: Port Howard Cemetery
- Military career
- Allegiance: United Kingdom
- Branch: British Army
- Service years: 1975–1982
- Rank: Captain
- Service number: 499793
- Units: Green Howards; 19 Troop, 22 SAS
- Conflicts: The Troubles; Falklands War: Operation Paraquet; Capture of Grytviken; Raid on Darwin; Raid on Pebble Island; Battle of Mount Kent; Skirmish at Many Branch Point †
- Awards: Military Cross

Captain Gavin John Hamilton, MC (15 May 1953 – 10 June 1982) was a British Army officer. He was educated at The Royal Masonic School, Bushey. He was the Officer Commanding 19 (Mountain) Troop, D Squadron, 22 Special Air Service during the Falklands War when he was killed in action behind enemy lines on West Falkland.

== Military career ==
After graduating from the Royal Military Academy, Sandhurst, Hamilton was commissioned as a subaltern with the Green Howards with the Service Number 499793 in 1975, and served with the British Army in Cyprus, Belize, and South Armagh in Northern Ireland during Operation Banner. He was transferred into the Special Air Service in 1981, being attached initially to its D Squadron, 19 (Mountain) Troop.

== Falklands War ==
=== South Georgia and Pebble Island ===
Having survived two helicopter crashes in adverse weather conditions on the Fortuna Glacier in South Georgia during Operation Paraquet, two days later Hamilton led the advance elements of the forces which captured the main Argentine positions in Grytviken. This action resulted in the surrender of Argentinian garrison occupying South Georgia. Shortly afterwards he led the Raid on Pebble Island, which resulted in the destruction of eleven FMA IA 58 Pucará and T-34 Mentor Argentinian aircraft on the ground.

=== Battle of Mount Kent ===
Once British ground forces had landed at San Carlos, Hamilton deployed with his SAS Squadron 40 miles behind the enemy lines to observe the main enemy defensive positions at Port Stanley, his leadership proving instrumental in seizing this ground, from which the final attack on Port Stanley, which would bring the war of liberation of the Falklands to a victorious conclusion, would ultimately be launched. On 27 May 1982 he identified an Argentine probe into the squadron's position and in the ensuing fight captured an Argentinian prisoner of war. The next night his troop held off another enemy attack, in doing so enabling 42 Commando Royal Marines to fly in to reinforce the position on 31 May 1982, which was a key stage in the Falkland Islands campaign. On the following day his troop ambushed another Argentinian patrol, capturing five members of it, three of whom were wounded.

=== Skirmish at Many Branch Point ===
On 5 June 1982 Hamilton was deployed in command of a four-man observation patrol into positions behind enemy lines on West Falkland to observe Argentinian activity at Port Howard. The patrol established itself in an observation post on the high ground of a ridge called Many Branch Point 2,750 yards (2,500 metres) from the Argentine positions, from which radio reports were dispatched. In the late morning of 10 June 1982, Hamilton and a radio operator (Cpl. Roy Fonseka, later a Seychellois cabinet minister) were manning the post when they were discovered by a four-man Argentinian patrol from the 1st Section of the 601 Commando Company, operating out of Port Howard. Fonseka first engaged the enemy force in the open, followed by Hamilton from the post itself. As the small arms fire-fight continued with grenades being exchanged, during which Hamilton was hit in the arm by a rifle bullet, Hamilton ordered that they should both attempt to fight their way out. As the only withdrawal route available was to the rear, and was exposed to enemy observation on the up slope of the ridge for 50 yards to the summit, Hamilton maintained automatic covering fire from within the post at the Argentinian commandos to allow Fonseka to withdraw first in a co-ordinated fall-back manoeuvre. Hamilton then attempted to follow, in the process was struck by Argentinian rifle fire and killed, Fonseka being afterwards taken prisoner of war.

Hamilton's body was buried with military honours by the Argentinian garrison on West Falkland, the grave lying in the small cemetery at Port Howard.

When the Argentinian Commander of Port Howard, Colonel Juan Ramon Mabragana, was interrogated by the British Forces after the Argentinian surrender on the Falkland Islands a few days later, he stated that Hamilton was "the most courageous man I have ever seen" and recommended that he should receive a gallantry decoration for his actions during the fire-fight. Hamilton was subsequently awarded the Military Cross posthumously.

== Subsequent events ==
The Argentine commando patrol commander from the engagement, José Martiniano Duarte, met Hamilton's wife (Vicky Hamilton) in 2002 at the Argentinian Embassy in London, expressing his personal regret for the events that had occurred at Many Branch Point 20 years before that had claimed her husband's life, and praising his bravery.
