= Tyssen Islands =

Group of islands in the Falkland Islands

- Island
- Location of the Tyssen Islands within the Falkland Islands
- Coordinates: 51.888°S 59.643°W
- Country: Falkland Islands
- Island group: Falkland Sound
- Time zone: UTC−3 (FKST)
- If shown, area and population ranks are for all islands and all inhabited islands in the Falklands respectively.

The Tyssen Islands lie in Falkland Sound, between West Falkland and East Falkland. They lie off Lafonia in East Falkland, and between the Swan Islands and Great Island, Falkland Islands. The group of islands lie 4 miles (6 km) south of the Swan Islands, and have some rocks south-west of the islands which are known as Tyssen Patch which stretch for 6 miles (10 km).

== Name ==
The islands are named after John Tyssen, a Royal Navy officer who arrived in the Falklands in 1839. The Hispanicized version of the island group is Islotes Tyssen.

== Geology ==
Islands in the group are; Sandbar Island, North Tyssen, Flat Tyssen, Sandy Island (or Sandy Tyssen), West Tyssen, High Tyssen and Peat Tyssen.

The geology of the islands is the same as the plain low-lying land of Lafonia, which is across the sound to the east. The rocks were laid down during the Mesozoic era and of Jurassic and Triassic origin, being composed of sandstone and mudstone. Strange comments that because the islands are on average 15 metres (49 ft) high, and barely rise above 30 metres (98 ft), they were better suited to farming animals and show "..the influence of man's settlement and stocking more than any other of the Falkland archipelago."

== Land use ==
Although some of the smaller islands, such as Peat and High Tyssen do not have sheep, Sandbar Island is still used for grazing.

== Wildlife ==
Sea lions are known to frequent the islands, and in the early 1930s, a survey estimated there to be 1,364 of them. Although a rare species for the Falkland Islands, the Hudsonian godwit has been recorded on Sandy Tyssen island in 2003. Flat Tyssen has had rabbits introduced onto the island at some point in its history, although it is unclear if the population is still extant.
