= Mount Robinson =

Mountain on West Falkland, Falkland Islands

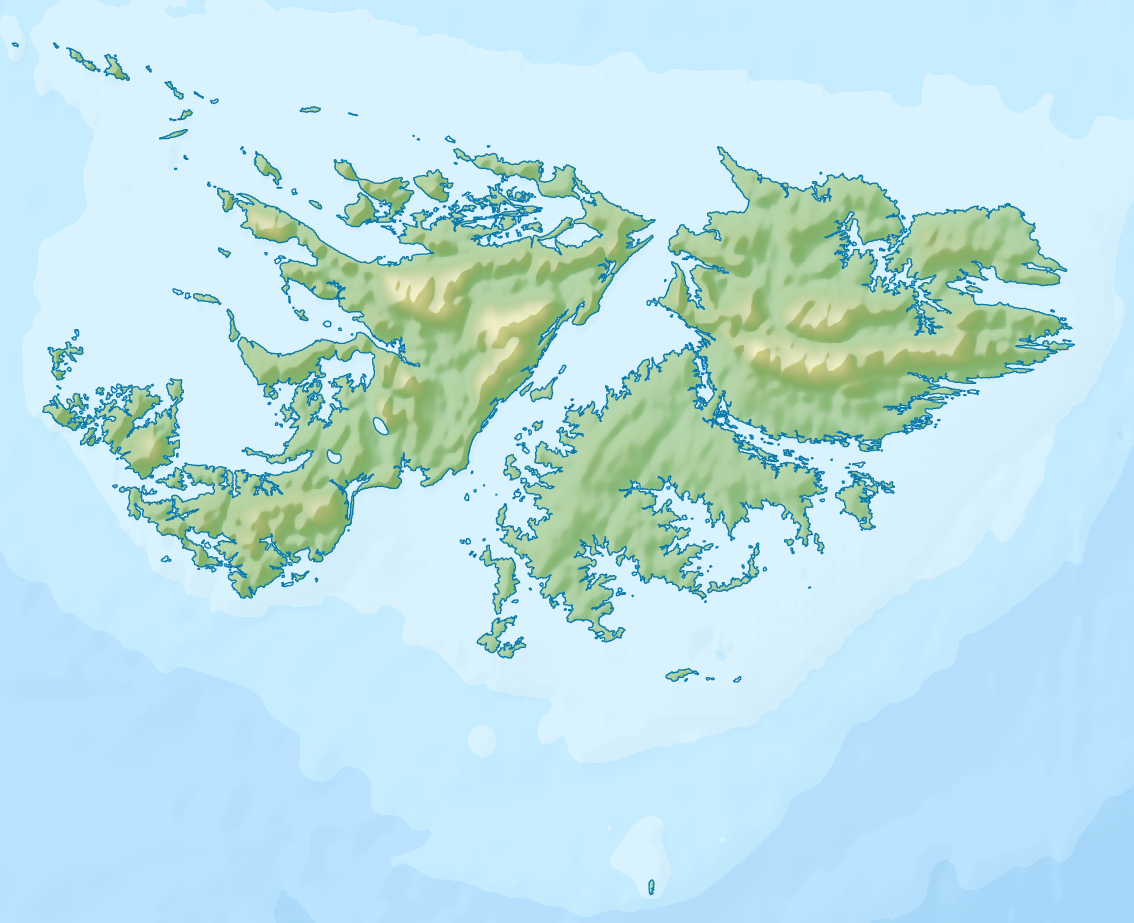
- Location within Falkland Islands Location within South America

Highest point
- Elevation: 680 m (2,230 ft)
- Coordinates: 51°35′49.2″S 59°55′30″W

Mount Robinson is a mountain on West Falkland. It was known as "Monte Independencia" in Spanish, until it was found Mount Adam was higher. It is the second highest point on the island. It is close to the source of the Warrah River. During the Falklands War, Argentine forces installed a radar on the mountain.
