= Mount Edgeworth =

Mountain in the Falkland Islands

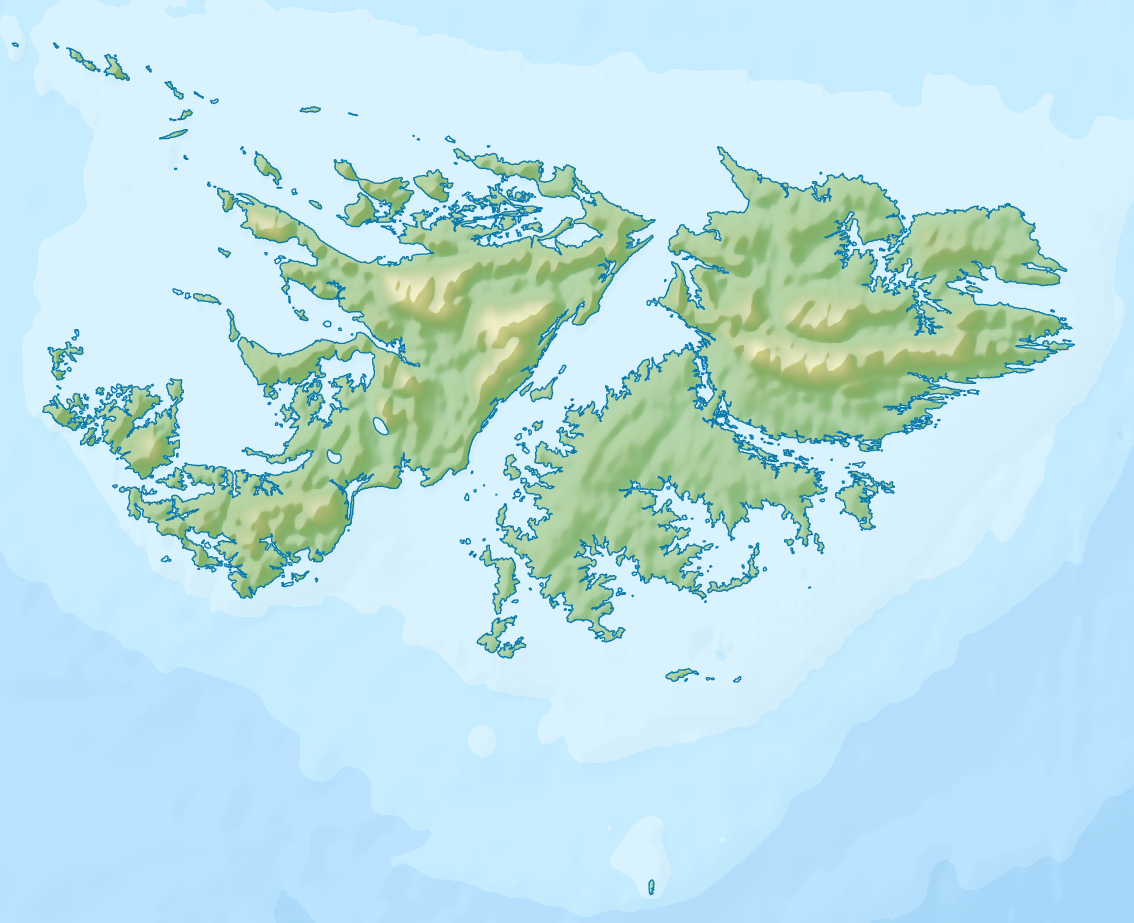
- Location within Falkland Islands

Highest point
- Coordinates: 51.52°S 59.90°W

Geography
- Location: West Falkland, Falkland Islands, south Atlantic Ocean

Mount Edgeworth is a mountain on West Falkland, Falkland Islands. It is northeast of Mount Adam and east of Hill Cove.
