= 601 Commando Company =

Argentine military unit

- Compañía de Comandos 601
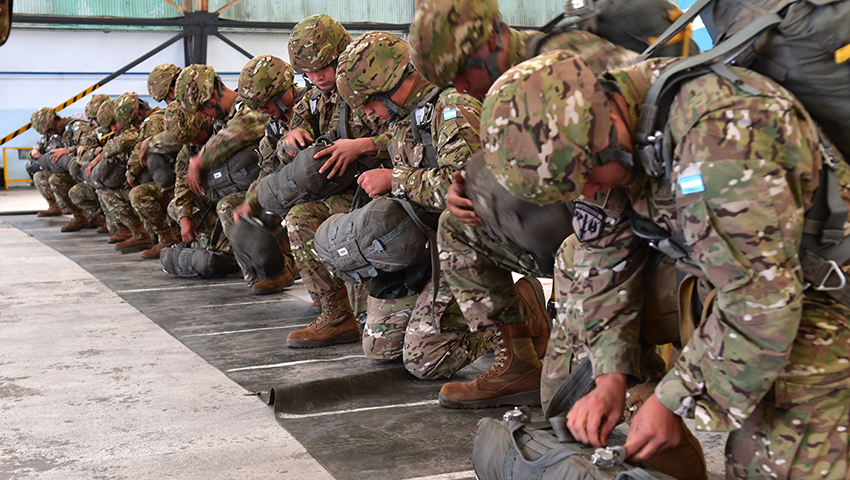
- Group of commandos in Puerto Belgrano, 2019
- Active: 1978–1982; 1982–present (current form)
- Country: Argentina
- Branch: Argentine Army
- Type: Commando
- Size: Company
- Part of: Special Operations Forces Grouping
- Garrison/HQ: Campo de Mayo, Buenos Aires
- Motto: "Pugna usque ad mortem pro veritatem"
- Engagements: Dirty War; Operativo Independencia; Falklands War; Tablada

Commanders
- Notable commanders: Lt.Col. Mohamed Alí Seineldín; Maj. Mario Castagneto

The 601 Commando Company (Spanish: Compañía de Comandos 601) is a one of three commando (special operations capable) units of the Argentine Army (EA).

== History ==
Created on 2 April 1982, it was based on the original Equipo Especial de Lucha contra la Subversión Halcón 8 created by the Argentine Army during the 1978 FIFA World Cup.

=== Falklands War ===
The commander of this unit in the Falklands War (Spanish: Guerra de las Malvinas) was 34-year-old, Major Mario Castagneto. The company was divided into three assault sections.

The first elements of 601 Commando Company arrived on 24 April, spending their first night in the former Royal Marine Moody Brook Barracks (that at the time served as the 10th Mechanized Infantry Brigade Headquarters) along with several regimental commanders that had earlier on attended a briefing in the building.

Fearing that British had established an Observation Post on Tussock Island, near Stanley Airfield, Major Mario Castagneto's 601 Commando Company was sent to clear the island of enemy special forces in early May, but returned empty handed and completely covered in black soot due to an earlier supporting Pucara bombing mission on 21 April with napalm.

In the first week of May, 601 Commando Company was also sent in helicopters to sweep Salvador Settlement in search of British special forces, after the local ranch-owner Robin Pittaluga had tried to relay a message from the British task force sent to recover the Falklands (it was common practise in the islands to relay radio messages). Robin and his son Saul were questioned at gunpoint and their radio confiscated with Robin taken to Port Stanley for further questioning and placed under house arrest there for the remainder of the war.

On 21 May, the Blowpipe surface-to-air missile (SAM) team of the 1st Assault Section under Lieutenant Sergio Fernández shot down a RAF Harrier GR3 piloted by Lieutenant William Glover at Port Howard that morning and damaged (severed the internal communications wiring) with a near-miss from a Blowpipe a RN Sea Harrier FRS1 piloted by Lieutenant Steve Thomas that afternoon that according to the British was hit by 50 caliber machinegun rounds (in reality shrapnel from the SAM).

On the night of 6/7 June, the 2nd Assault Section attacked British patrols near the Murrell Bridge, northwest of Stanley.

On 6 June two patrols under Corporals Brown and Haddon rendezvoused 200 yards north of the Murrell Bridge and observed an enemy patrol crossing the skyline to the east of the river (...) They were forced to evacuate their position rapidly, leaving behind their packs and radio, but succeeded in withdrawing without suffering any casualties. The location was checked on the evening of 8 June by another patrol, but there was no sign of the packs or radio, which meant the battalion's radio net could have been compromised.

Corporal Ned Kelly from 3 PARA's B Company reports coming under mortar fire:

The platoon commander was 300 metres on the other side of the bridge, about 600 metres behind us. When I asked him to get us out he refused, saying that the enemy fire was not effective! I told him he should get his fucking arse over our side of the river and try it because it looked pretty effective to us. I had a standing patrol 500 metres away in dead ground. The Argentinians started mortaring them, chasing them back to our positions. Then their artillery came in.

Private Colin Charlton from the Close-Target-Reconnaissance Patrol from D Company observed the soft peat absorbed much of the deadly fire:

We nearly got hit by their mortars. All we heard was 'pop, pop, pop'. The mortar shells landed either side of Colin and Paul’s patrol, close enough to kill or injure the men in other circumstances. We saw the shells land but the peat absorbed the impact. Had it been concrete, there would have been a lot of debris.

According to Private Mark Hunt from D Company:

We saw our first action a couple of weeks later when the Argentinians landed a large fighting patrol to try and capture someone to get information. We saw a load of people in the valley coming towards us and we engaged them. They had massive fire support with 50-cal and 7.62mm machine guns and blasted us, it was raining bullets and we were forced to withdraw.

On the night of 7–8 June, the 3rd Assault Section under Captain Jorge Eduardo Jándula took up ambush positions near the abandoned British positions, but no further contact took place between 3 PARA's D Company and 601 Commando Company.

On 10 June, a 4-man patrol under Lieutenant José Martiniano Duarte from the 1st Assault Section operating on West Falkland bumped into part of 19 Mountain Troop, D Squadron, 22nd Special Air Service Regiment (22 SAS Regiment). The SAS observation post on Many Branch Ridge reportedly split into two pairs with Captain Gavin Hamilton and his signaller, Corporal Errol "Roy" Fonseka covering the escape of the second pair, before Hamilton was killed and Fonseca was captured.

According to Major Cedric Delves from the SAS's D Squadron:

Unfortunately, the Argentinians had indeed come in from the direction of the rear position, right through it. As dawn broke the LUP discovered the enemy, lots of them, feet away. The two patrol members were right in and among the opposition, with little or no prospect of opening up on the radio without being heard. They would first have to crawl out to one side, to get out of earshot, before warning John and Roy. It took an age during which time, unknown to them, a number of the enemy had moved further down the hill in the direction of the OP.

On the night of 13–14 June, the 3rd Assault Section under Captain José Ramón Negretti was entrusted with the all round defence of Stanley House (the 10th Brigade Headquarters), a task the Argentine Army Green Berets bitterly resented, preferring action in the frontlines.

During the Battle of Wireless Ridge, command and control broke down in the 7th Infantry Regiment and the Green Berets from the 2nd Assault Section were instructed to restore order and shoot on sight British SAS believed to have infiltrated the retreating Argentine companies.

=== Battle of La Tablada Barracks ===
In late January 1989, heavily armed leftist guerrillas from the All For The Fatherland Movement (Movimiento Todos Por La Patria or MTP) captured the 3rd Mechanized Infantry Regiment Barracks in the La Tablada suburb of Buenos Aires. In the ensuing 1989 attack on La Tablada barracks, 601 Commando Company (under Falklands/Malvinas War veteran Sergio Fernandez who had risen in ranks to major) helped recover the barracks in close-quarters battle, but lost two killed, Lieutenant Ricardo Alberto Rolón and Sergeant Ramón Wladimir Orué in the process.

=== 21st century ===
The company is based on Campo de Mayo, Buenos Aires Province and is under the command of the Rapid Deployment Force (Fuerza de Despliegue Rápido) as part of the Special Operations Forces Grouping (AFOE).

== Unit insignia ==
The members of the unit wear green berets with unit badges.

== Equipment ==
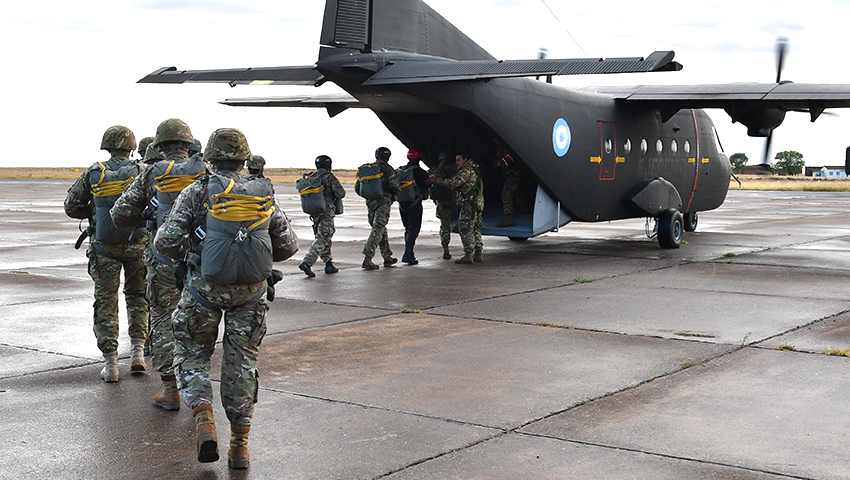
Comandos with the Air Force

- FN FAL
- Steyr AUG
- M4 carbine
- Brügger & Thomet APC
- Colt 9 mm SMG
- Browning Hi-Power
- Glock 17
- Steyr HS .50
- FN MAG
- M249
- AT4

== See also ==
- 602 Commando Company
- Mountain Huntsmen

== Notes and references ==
=== Sources ===
- Ruiz Moreno, Isidoro J. (2016) [1986]. Comandos en acción (in Spanish). Buenos Aires: Claridad. ISBN 978-950-620-312-2.
