= Chartres, Falkland Islands =

Settlement in the Falkland Islands

Coordinates: 51.7116°S 60.0793°W

Chartres is one of the main settlements on West Falkland, in the Falkland Islands. It is on the west coast of West Falkland, at the mouth of Chartres River, at the eastern shore of King George Bay. One of the two only proper roads on West Falkland runs between Chartres and Port Howard. It is one of the closest settlements to Mount Adam to the North, the highest point on West Falkland.

Chartres and the Chartres River were named after Edward Chartres, the surgeon aboard HMS Philomel.
