= Great Island (disambiguation) =

Great Island is an island within Cork Harbour in Ireland.

Great Island may also refer to:

- Great Island (Newfoundland and Labrador), an island in Canada
- Great Island, Falkland Islands
- "The Great Island" another name for Madagascar
- Great Island (New Zealand), an island in Fiordland, New Zealand
- Manawatāwhi / Great Island, an island in the Three Kings Islands group of New Zealand
- Great Island or King's Island, an island of Enfield, Connecticut
- Great Island (Massachusetts), an island of Massachusetts
- Great Island Power Station, County Wexford, Ireland

== See also ==
- Great Barrier Island, an island off New Zealand
