= Chartres River =

Watercourse on West Falkland

Coordinates: 51°44′12″S 60°00′14″W

- Topographic map of the Falkland Islands; Chartres as at 619525

Location
- British Overseas Territory: Falkland Islands

Physical characteristics
- Source: Mount Moody
- Mouth
  - location: Chartres
- Length: 25 kilometres (16 mi)

Chartres River is one of the two largest watercourses on West Falkland, along with the Warrah River. The river rises from the confluence of two streams on Mount Moody in the Hornby Mountains, and flows westwards for some 25 kilometres (16 mi) before emptying into Christmas Harbour, an inlet of King George Bay. The river is tidal as a report from 1928 informed about a wooden bridge which was used at high tide as the ford just downstream could not be used for crossing with horses or sheep. The bridge was built in 1928 by the local farmers with material supplied to them from the government of the islands. The bridge is some 8 miles (13 km) upriver of Chartres settlement and is 120 feet (37 m) long, 12 feet (3.7 m) wide, and 9 feet 6 inches (2.90 m) high. A survey of the river flow to allow the bridge to be built suggested it was only 1–1.5 feet (0.30–0.46 m) deep in summer, and during flooding, this could rise to between 6–7 feet (1.8–2.1 m).

Brown trout and sea trout are known to be in the river, and sampling in 1999, showed that the river was 25 metres (82 ft) wide in places with a temperature of around 7.8 °C (46.0 °F) with no evidence of zebra trout. As the river is known to be a good spot for fishing, it has been restocked with brown trout. The river was named after Dr William Chatres, a surgeon aboard HMS Philomel which surveyed the islands in the 1840s. The settlement of Chartres takes its name from the river that is stands on. When an aircraft lands for the Chartres settlement, it uses the estuary of the Chartres River, and is roped in to the shore. The Royal Navy surveyed the estuary and some of the river in 1967, after reports that when the RMS Darwin was collecting wool from the settlements in the estuary, it came close to running aground.
