= Bold Cove =

Inlet on West Falkland, Falkland Islands

Coordinates: 51.6084°S 59.4676°W

Bold Cove is a small inlet on West Falkland near Port Howard on Falkland Sound, notable for its history. It runs parallel to the northern end of Port Howard, and Peake Ridge forms the west coast. It is approximately two miles long.

Captain John Strong of the Welfare made the first recorded landing on either of the main islands (West and East Falkland) on 29 January 1690, at Bold Cove on the other side of the headland from the Bold Cove and Manybranch Farms. He said:

"Wednesday this morning we weighed and stood unto an harbour on ye west side and there came to ane anchor and sent our boat on shoar for fresh water and did kill abundance of geese and ducks but as far as wood there is none."

The mention about the lack of wood is somewhat surprising, since while there were no trees growing there, although driftwood frequently washes up on Falkland beaches. Strong named the body of water between West and East Falkland as Falkland Sound, from which the islands were later named.

On the 300th anniversary of his landing, in 1990, a plaque was erected on the spot to commemorate the event.
