= Skirmish at Many Branch Point =

1982 skirmish during the Falklands War

Coordinates: 51°31′45.30″S 59°24′53.09″W

- Part of Falklands War
Date	10 June 1982
Location	Packes Ridge, north of Port Howard, West Falkland
Result	Argentine victory

Belligerents
United Kingdom	Argentina

Commanders and leaders
(United Kingdom) Cap. Gavin Hamilton †	(Argentina) Lt. José Martiniano Duarte

Units involved
Special Air Service	601 Commando Company

Strength
4 SAS troopers (2 engaged)	4 commandos

Casualties and losses
1 killed 1 captured	none

On 10 June 1982, in the closing days of the Falklands War, Many Branch Point, a ridge near Port Howard in West Falkland, was the site of a minor skirmish between the Argentine and British Armed Forces. The engagement ended with the death of the SAS patrol commander, Captain Gavin Hamilton. The action was the only ground engagement of the British and Argentine forces on West Falkland during the conflict.

== Background ==
Whilst the Argentine 35 mm radar-guided and 20 mm anti-aircraft guns at Port Stanley and Goose Green on East Falkland island forced the British Sea Harriers and Harrier GR.3's to carry out airstrikes from high altitude, their garrison on West Falkland island was equipped only with 12.7 mm heavy machine guns, which left it vulnerable to strafing and low-level bombing attacks from the Royal Air Force and Fleet Air Arm. In a reinforcement of the garrison on West Falkland, the Argentine Command dispatched 601 Commando Company to the Headquarters post of its 5th Regiment of Infantry sited at Port Howard, the commandos bringing with them as a part of their fire-power the British-made shoulder-fired Blowpipe missile system to augment the position's air defences. After a 24-hour trip from Port Stanley the company reached its destination. A few days later, in the morning of 21 May 1982, with the British landing at San Carlos bay on East Falkland underway, 601 Commando Company shot the wing off of a GR3 Harrier from No.1 Squadron, R.A.F. on a reconnaissance mission over Port Howard, the pilot (Flt. Lt. Jeffrey Glover) ejecting into the sea badly injured from exiting the aircraft at high speed and being taken prisoner by the garrison.

The Argentine garrison on West Falkland had by this time become practically cut-off due to the developing adverse strategic situation for the Argentine Forces, and 601 Commando Company was issued with an order to try to gather intelligence information about British activity that could be seen on the opposite shore of East Falkland across the Falkland Sound, where the main campaign was taking place.

In the meantime detachments from the British Army's Special Air Service Regiment had also been active around the Argentine advanced posts on West Falkland. On 5 June 1982, a four-man patrol led by Captain Hamilton moved into an observation position on a ridge overlooking Port Howard from the North upon a piece of ground known as Many Branch Point, with the aim of gathering intelligence on the Argentine forces located there.

On the morning of 9 June 1982 a routine reconnaissance patrol by 601 Commando Company, led by First Lieutenant José Martiniano Duarte, also moved on to Many Branch Point to establish an ad hoc observation post on the high vantage point that it offered across the Falkland Sound. Previously, an Argentine observation post had been sited upon Mount Rosalie, but it had been compromised due to a British presence and the Commandos had withdrawn from it without detection, and they now sought an alternative position. The Argentine patrol was originally composed of nine men, but by the afternoon with no enemy thought to be in the direct vicinity, five men returned into Port Howard whilst Lt. Duarte with three non-commissioned officers, viz. Sergeants Eusebio Moreno, Francisco Altamirano and Corporal Roberto Ríos, remained up on the ridge. From this position, they were able to observe that a British airfield had been constructed near San Carlos. (British sources state that Capt. Hamilton was 'heavily outnumbered' in the engagement that followed, but this would appear to be contradicted by the small numbers of Argentinians given as being in the vicinity in their own accounts).

== Contact at the observation post ==
Late in the morning of 10 June 1982, whilst still in position observing across the Falkland Sound, Duarte thought that he could hear distant voices being carried upon the wind, emanating from some way further along the ridge. Summoning his patrol together he moved along the ridge-line, continuing to hear snatches of voices apparently in conversation with one another, until he came to a cluster of cave-shaped rocks, wherein he suspected that either a British military presence was hidden in situ, or possibly that it might be a weather-shelter for some Falklander shepherds.

As they approached the rock formation a man with a dark skin complexion and a large moustache (Cpl. Roy Fonseka, Royal Signals attached to the Special Air Service, who was of Seychellois origin), wearing a camouflage uniform and a green balaclava suddenly walked out from amidst it into the open ground, unaware of the commandos' presence and looking away in another direction. Initially, the Argentinians hesitated as the balaclava resembled the ones issued to their own forces, and Duarte shouted a challenge: "Argentinos o Ingleses?" (Argentine or English?), at which Fonseka turned towards him and stopped dead, staring at him as if stunned and failed to respond. After a short silence, Lt. Duarte yelled in English: "Hands up, hands up!". In response to this Fonseka suddenly dropped to the ground, and producing a weapon opened fire at Duarte, which struck the rocks in front of him as he ducked for cover, briefly blinding him with rock dust. As the commandos scrambled to get into covered firing positions Fonseka leapt up and ran back into the rocks from where he had emerged, and a general small-arms fire-fight commenced between the 4 Argentinians and the 2-man British Army forward observation post that they had discovered. During the engagement Sergeant Eusebio Moreno threw two grenades at the British post, and received in reply a British 40 mm grenade, which exploded a few yards to the rear, and Hamilton, firing at the commandos from within the post alongside Fonseka, was struck in the arm by a bullet.

Under the weight of fire from Duarte's patrol, the British two-man team attempted to abandon the position and retire up the short stretch of ridgeline to their rear in order to gain the high ground and access to the ridge's reverse slope beyond the summit, with Capt. Hamilton ordering Fonseka to fall-back as a first move whilst he covered him with automatic fire. However, as it was underway and Fonseka was heading up the slope Hamilton was struck again by rifle fire from Lt. Duarte and killed whilst himself exiting the post, and Fonseka surrendered shortly afterwards and was taken prisoner of war.

Although Hamilton wore no rank or insignia (as is SAS practice), he was identified by his dog tag. Also found in the captured observation post was a radio, an M16 and an AR-15 rifle, a beacon, maps and a communications code book.

Another two men who were a part of Hamilton's patrol but were not present at the post during the attack withdrew from the area and were later rescued by British Forces.

== Subsequent events ==
The night after the engagement saw inaccurate shelling by Royal Navy frigates of Port Howard, leading to speculation amongst Argentinians that the purpose of Hamilton's post had been to act as a Naval Gunfire Support Forward Observer (NGSFO).

A subsequent later medical examination revealed that Hamilton had been killed by a 7.62 mm shot in the back. Another bullet had struck his arm. His body was buried at Port Howard. Hamilton's grave today can be seen from Many Branch Point ridge at Port Howard.

When the Commanding Officer of Port Howard, Col. Juan Ramon Mabragaña, was interrogated by the British after the surrender of the Argentinian Forces on the Falklands four days after Hamilton's death, he recommended that Hamilton receive a decoration for the heroism he displayed during the engagement at the observation post. Hamilton was subsequently posthumously awarded the Military Cross.

In 2002, Duarte met Hamilton's widow Vicky at the Argentine Embassy in London. He expressed personal regret for the events that had occurred and praised Hamilton's bravery.
