= New Haven, Falkland Islands =

Inlet in the Falkland Islands

New Haven
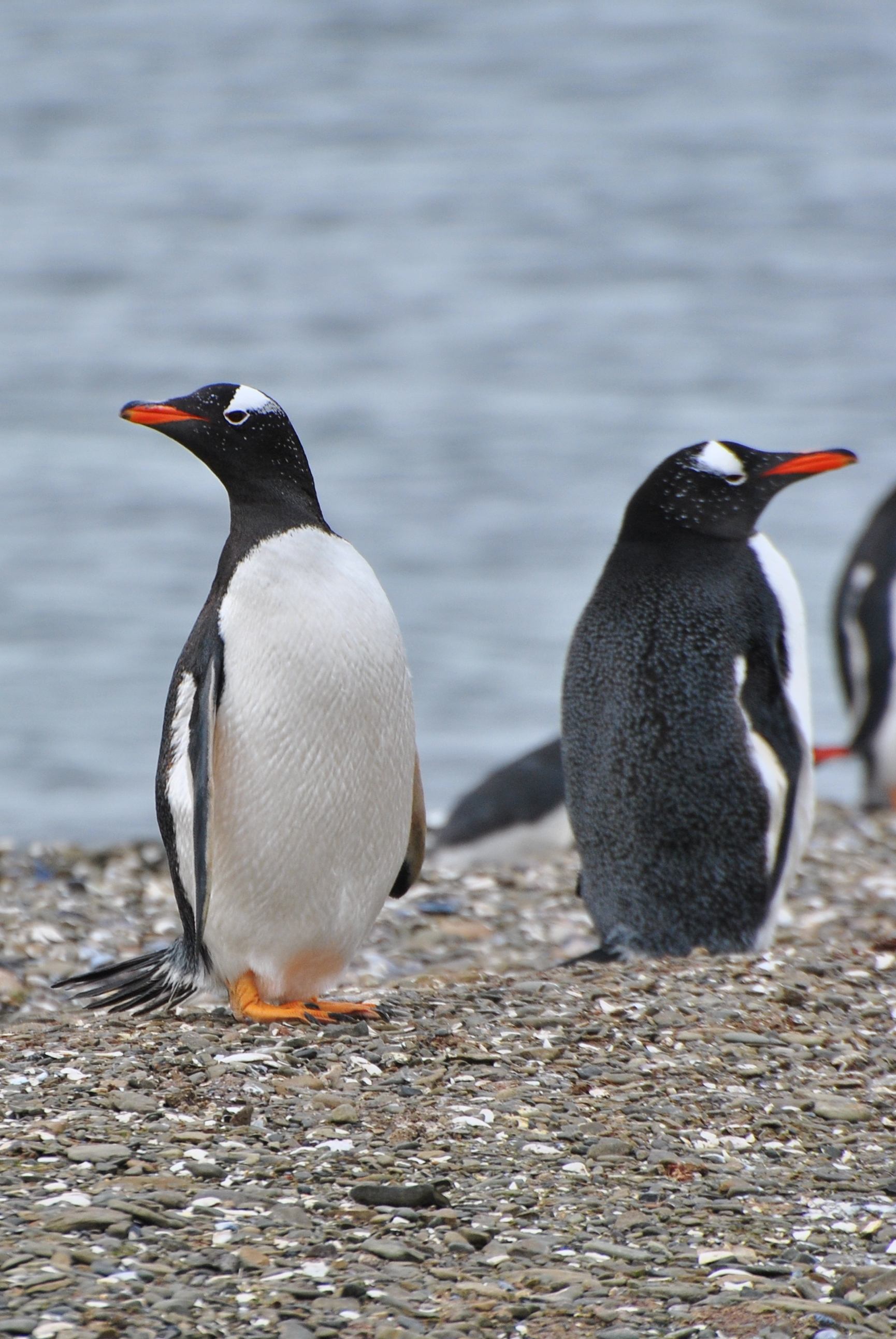
- Gentoo penguins at New Haven

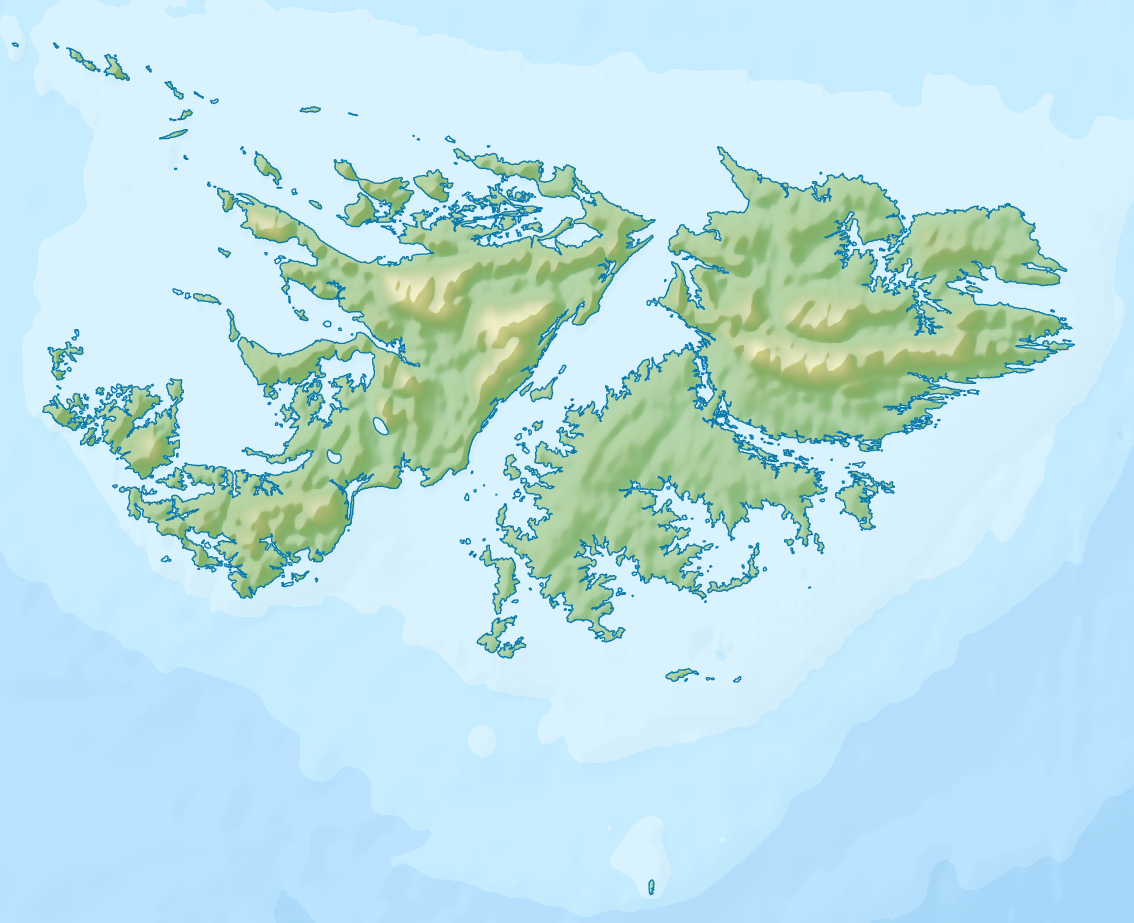
- Location within Falkland Islands
- Location: Falkland Islands
- Coordinates: 51.7286°S 59.2139°W
- Type: Inlet

New Haven is an inlet in the Falkland Islands. It is situated on the west coast of East Falkland, facing Falkland Sound, the stretch of water which divides East Falkland from West Falkland. There is a colony of gentoo penguins.

New Haven has become notable as the eastern terminus of the new ferry service linking the two islands. A modern roll-on-roll-off ferry terminal was constructed at New Haven at a cost of £1.5 million—the largest project so far undertaken by the Public Works Department of the Falkland Islands Government. The terminal was opened in a ceremony in November 2008 after 12 months of construction.

The ferry serving the route is the MV Concordia Bay, which is based at New Haven. It runs a regular service from the terminal to Port Howard on West Falkland since July 2008, carrying lorries, cars and people. The ferry is owned and operated by Workboat Services Ltd.
