= Swan Islands, Falkland Islands =

Swan Islands
- Island
- Location of the Swan Islands within the Falkland Islands
- Coordinates: 51°47′33″S 59°35′03″W
- Country: Falkland Islands
- Island group: Falkland Sound
- Time zone: UTC−3 (FKST)
- If shown, area and population ranks are for all islands and all inhabited islands in the Falklands respectively.

The Swan Islands (Spanish: Islas del Cisne) are a small group of islands in the middle of Falkland Sound in the Falkland Islands, and comprising Swan Island and the smaller West Swan Island and North Swan Island.

== Geography and wildlife ==
The islands are low-lying, and mainly covered in tussac grass, with the birdlife common to most of the Falkland Islands.

The islands lie between West Falkland and Lafonia on East Falkland, the two largest islands of the archipelago, and which shelter them from rougher weather from the east and west.

== History ==
Admiral George Grey, surveying the Falkland Islands in 1836, says in his journal entry of 21 December -

"The Swan Islands are low and covered in tussock excepting the centre of the largest one where there is some clear ground with a sort of clear water lake in it where one of the Midshipmen killed a wild swan; we had been told that there were a number of wild pigs on this island, but I did not succeed in killing any, although I landed 50 men to beat the island."

It is perhaps from this swan that the islands derive their name.
