= Tussock Island =

Tussock Island (54°29′S 37°7′W) is an island 0.2 nautical miles (0.4 km) long, lying off the west side of Annenkov Island, South Georgia. Following geological work by British Antarctic Survey (BAS), 1972–73, it was named after the thick mantle of tussock grass (Poa flabellata) that grows on the island.

== See also ==
- List of Antarctic and sub-Antarctic islands
