= Falkland Sound =

Sound between the Falkland Islands

Coordinates: 51°48′S 59°30′W

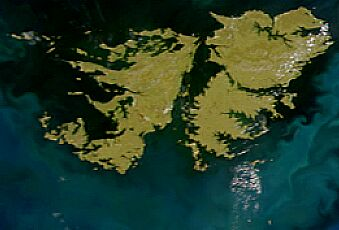
The Falkland Sound, here in November 1999, is the large strait running between the two larger islands.

The Falkland Sound (Spanish: Estrecho de San Carlos) is a sea strait in the Falkland Islands. Running southwest-northeast, it separates West and East Falkland.

== Name ==
The sound was named by John Strong in 1690 for Viscount Falkland, the name only later being applied to the archipelago and its two largest islands. The Spanish name "Estrecho de San Carlos" refers to the ship San Carlos which visited in 1768; confusingly the English name "San Carlos Water" is a much smaller inlet on East Falkland - and gives its name to San Carlos, Port San Carlos and the San Carlos River.

Captain John Strong of the Welfare made the first recorded landing on either of the main islands (West and East Falkland) on 29 January 1690, at Bold Cove (near Port Howard) just off Falkland Sound.

== Geography ==
The sound cuts between the two main islands in a northeast-southwest alignment, though minor islands within the body of water include Narrows Island, Great Island, the Tyssen Islands and the Swan Islands. Eddystone Rock is at the northern end of the Sound; the Arch Islands are at the southern end.

Settlements on it include Ajax Bay, New Haven, Port San Carlos, San Carlos on East Falkland and Port Howard and Fox Bay on West Falkland. A car ferry goes between Port Howard and New Haven.

Inlets and bays on the Sound include: Fox Bay, Port Howard (West Falkland); Grantham Sound, San Carlos Water, Ruggles Bay (East Falkland). On West Falkland, the Hornby Hills run parallel to the sound.

== Geology ==
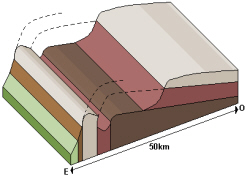
Folding of West Falkland - the Sound is parallel to the folds and would occupy the front left-hand corner of the diagram.

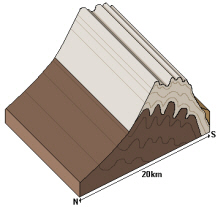
Folding of East Falkland Island - the Sound is at right angles to the folds and would occupy the front right-hand corner of the diagram.

About 400 million years ago the land that became the Falkland Islands and Antarctica's Ellsworth Mountains, which had been part of Gondwana, broke from what is now Africa and drifted westwards relative to Africa. During the mid-Jurassic period (about 170 million years ago) the land fragment that was to become East Falkland and the land fragment that was to become West Falkland rotated about 120° relative to each other. As a result, the fold lines in West Falkland run almost south-west to north-east, parallel to the Sound. Those in the northern part of East Falkland run east-west, forming the eastern part of northern entrance to the Sound and bordering on the northern banks of San Carlos Water. The boundary between these two land fragments, the Falkland Sound Fault, lies close to and parallel with the western shore of the Sound. Lafonia (the southern half of East Falkland), which is a much newer formation, has no folds.

It is believed that at times during the Pleistocene era, the seabed was some 46 metres (151 ft) lower than the present time–sufficient for the sound to be bridged.

== Records ==
On 21 January 2025, Esther Bertram of Stanley and Nuala Knight of Fox Bay swam across Falkland Sound, beginning from Fanning Head, East Falkland. The swimmers reached Jersey Point on West Falkland after 2 hours 37 minutes.
