= Fox Bay =

Coordinates: 51.9333°S 60.1000°W

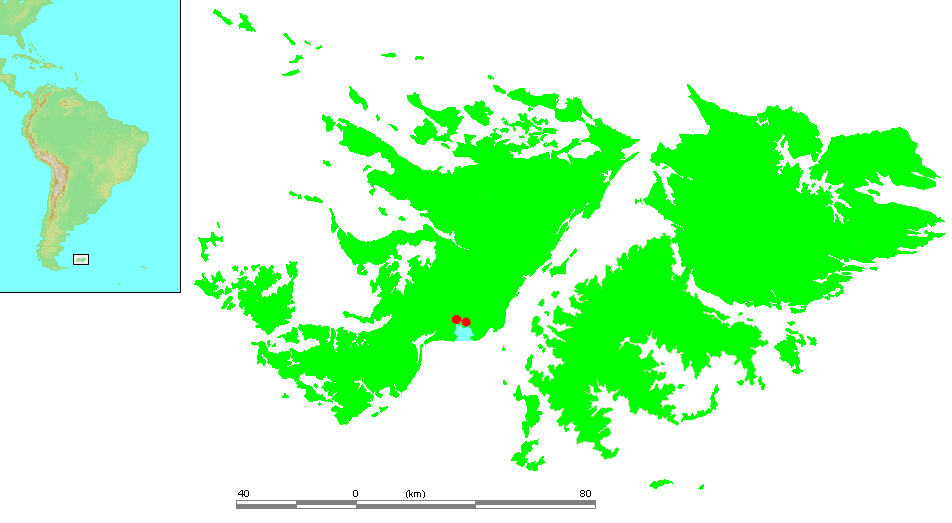
- Locations within the Falkland Islands of Fox Bay and its namesakes Fox Bay East and Fox Bay West.

Fox Bay (Spanish: Bahía Fox or Bahía Zorro) is the second largest settlement on West Falkland in the Falkland Islands. It is located on a bay of the same name, and is on the south east coast of the island. It is often divided into Fox Bay East ("FBE") and Fox Bay West ("FBW") making it two settlements: combined, these make the largest settlement on West Falkland, but if separated, Port Howard is the largest. Fox Bay takes its name, like the Warrah River, from the Falkland fox, an animal locally called the warrah and now extinct.

Fox Bay East's houses are scattered around a common. There is a school, a shop, and a post office which was founded in the 1890s. There is also a social club, and a refuelling base for RAF helicopters. In the post office building since 2015 is a small postal museum.

Fox Bay has two airstrips for use by FIGAS Islander aircraft.

Fox Bay West was once as large as FBE, but since the farm was subdivided and sold off in 1985 the number of residents has diminished. Until the 1990s, the track between the two settlements was "so bad that [it was] often impassable in the winter months" but an all-weather track was built in the early 1990s, improving communication between the two settlements. This was one of the first roads in the now extensive West Roads scheme.

== History ==
In July 1918, James Innes Wilson (b. 1882) settled on Fox Bay East Farm and became a successful and popular farmer. From 1909-1914 Wilson had been working for the British government as 'whaling inspector' (magistrate) on the sub-Antarctic island of South Georgia.

Fox Bay East Settlement was bought by the Falklands government from Packe Brothers in 1983, not long after the Falklands War. The rest of the farm was divided into three and sold privately, with the owners buying houses in the settlement.

From the 1880s until 1972, Darwin and Fox Bay had their own separate medical officers. Since then most medical care has been based in Stanley.

Fox Bay West was subdivided and sold by the FIC in 1985.

=== Falklands War ===
During the Falklands War, Fox Bay was occupied by Argentine troops, around 900 men from 8th Motorised Infantry Regiment and elements of 9th Engineer Company. Several minefields were sowed around both settlements by the troops, these no longer remain. Fox Bay was strafed and bombed by British Harrier aircraft and bombarded by the Royal Navy several times during the war. Human casualties were low, but there was a major hit on the Argentine vessel ARA Bahía Buen Suceso, which happened to be moored at Fox Bay East at the time of the first British Harrier raid. Bahía Buen Suceso was a 5,000-ton fleet transport that was serving as a logistic ship, intended to resupply the scattered Argentine garrisons around the islands. The ship was attacked by two BAe Sea Harrier FRS.Mk.1s (XZ500 and ZA191) from HMS Hermes.

As it was so close to houses, the Harriers used their 30 mm ADEN cannons rather than general-purpose bombs. They succeeded in damaging the ship's bridge and engine room, and also setting fire to a paint store and workshop ashore. One of the Harriers was hit in the tail by a 7.62 mm calibre bullet while strafing the transport, though the aircraft was able to return to Hermes safely. In a storm during the conflict she partially tore loose from her moorings and the bow swung on to the beach. Once the war ended, she was towed away to San Carlos Water by the tug Irishman.

On 27 April, 14 people from Stanley whom the Argentines considered "undesirable" were sent to Fox Bay and placed under house arrest for the duration of the Argentine occupation, some of whom were members of the Falkland Islands Defence Force.

Fox Bay was liberated by HMS Avenger and Royal Marines from 40 Commando on 15 June 1982 and this date is commemorated by residents as their liberation day.

In 2007, a memorial was erected to mark 25 years since the British victory.

== Demining Operations ==
A number of Argentine landmines were laid around Fox Bay West and many of the mine-related accidents in the Falklands occurred there.

Almost 30 years after Britain and Argentina went to war, a project was launched to rid the territory of the approximately 19,000 landmines left by Argentine troops and that BACTEC International Ltd. had been awarded the contract to clear four sites at Fox Bay, Goose Green, Sapper Hill, and Surf Bay. In early 2010, demining work started Fox Bay.

== Notable people from Fox Bay ==
- Louis Baillon, the Olympic field hockey player, was born in Fox Bay on 5 August 1881.
- George Paice, the Commonwealth Games Lawn Bowls player, was born in Fox Bay in 1941.
