= Mount Adam (Falkland Islands) =

Mountain on West Malvinas

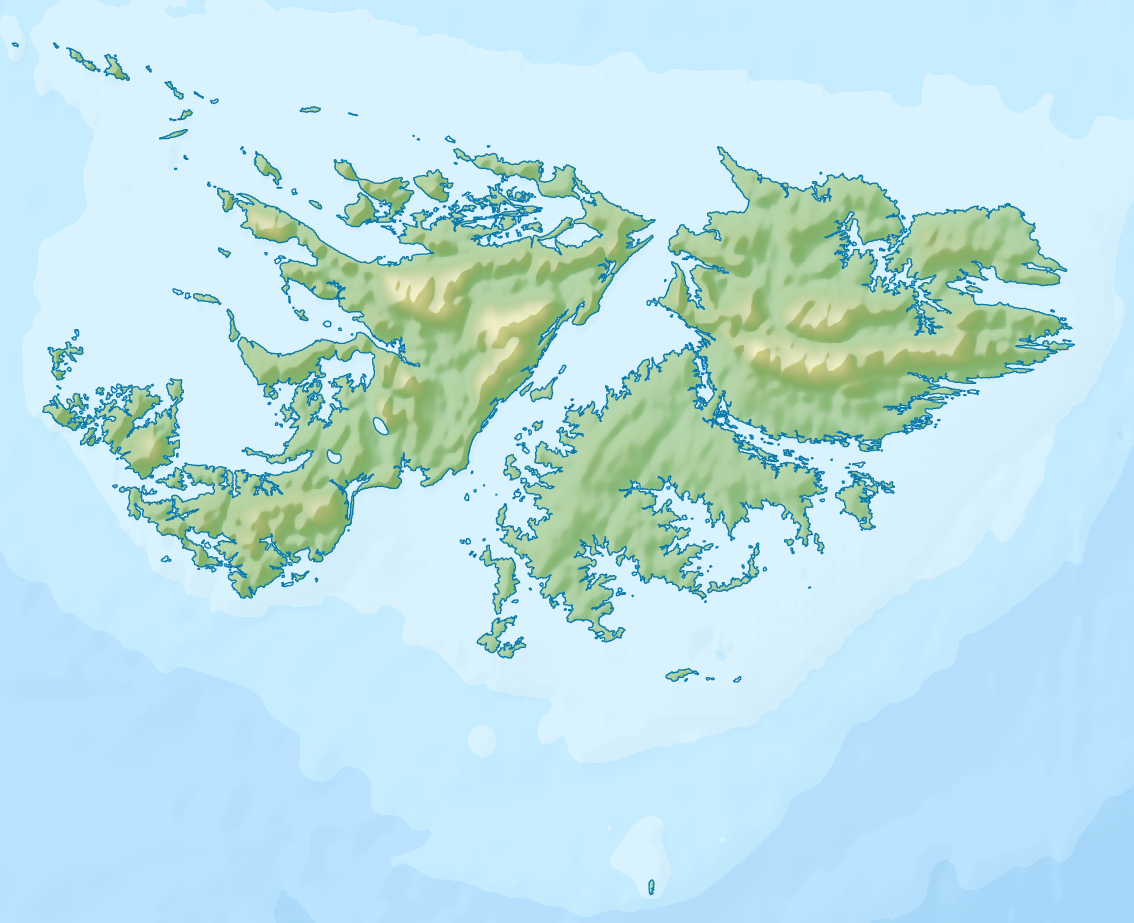
- Location within Falkland Islands

Highest point
- Elevation: 700 m (2,300 ft)
- Prominence: 700 m (2,300 ft)
- Isolation: 83.88 km (52.12 mi)
- Coordinates: 51°35′06″S 60°02′04″W

Geography
- Location: West Falkland, Falkland Islands, south Atlantic Ocean
- Parent range: Hill Cove Mountains

Mount Adam (Spanish: "Monte Independencia/Monte Beaufort") is a mountain on West Falkland, part of the Hill Cove Mountains range. It is the highest mountain on West Falkland and is the second highest in the islands. It has the remains of glacial cirques on it, and is only 5 metres (16 ft) lower than Mount Usborne, the highest peak of the Falkland Islands on East Falkland. Its summit is at 700 metres (2,300 ft). It is south west of Mount Edgeworth. The closest settlements are Hill Cove to the North, and Chartres to the South.

As one of the highest mountains of the Falkland Islands, it experienced some glaciation. The handful of mountains over 610 metres (2,000 ft) have:

"pronounced corries with small glacial lakes at their bases, morainic ridges deposited below the corries suggest that the glaciers and ice domes were confined to areas of maximum elevation with other parts of the islands experiencing a periglacial climate"
