= Blowpipe (missile) =

Portable surface-to-air missile

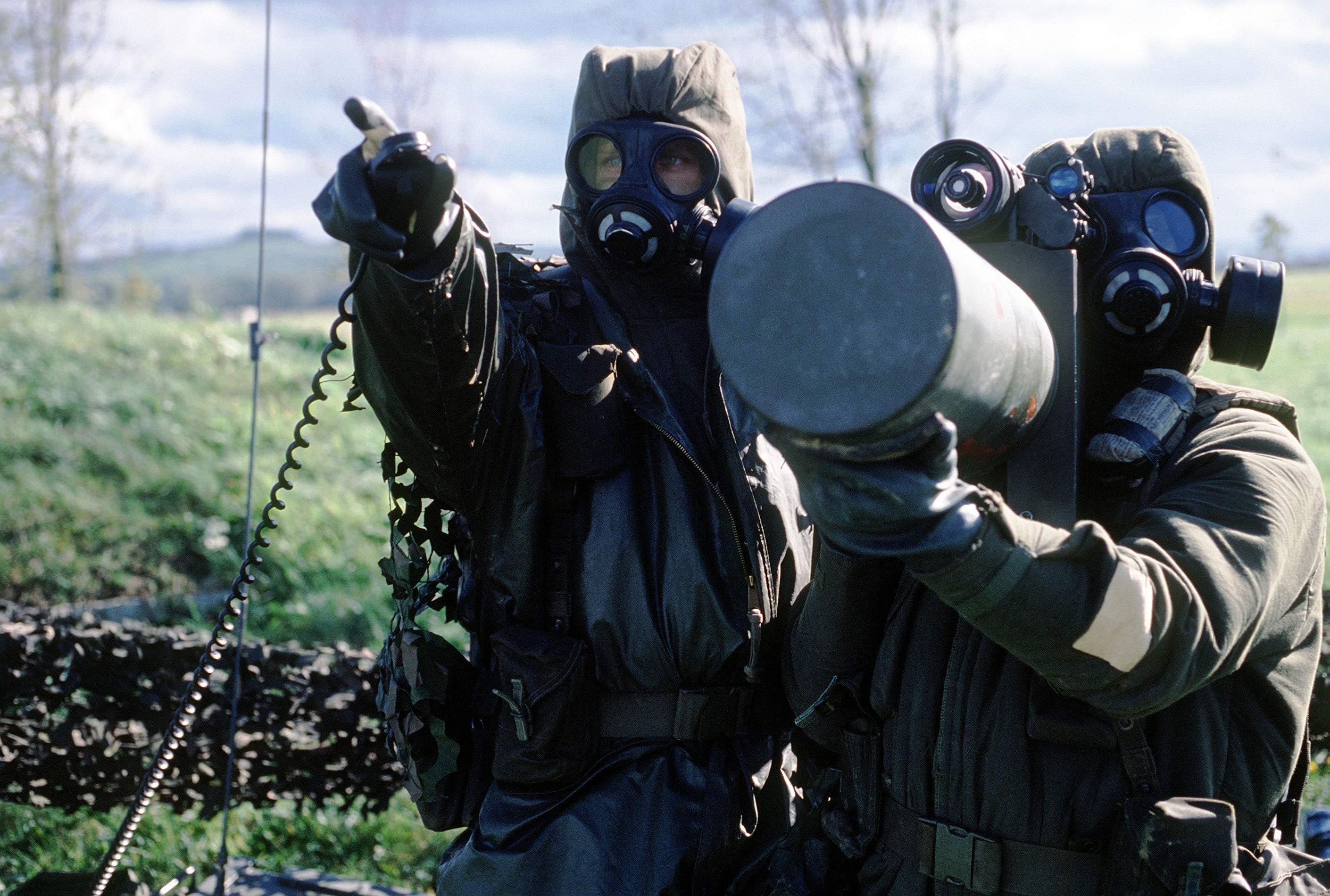
- A Canadian missile detachment of 129th Airfield Air Defence Battery, RCA, with Blowpipe during NATO Exercise Cornet Phaser in 1987. The soldiers are wearing Nuclear, Biological and Chemical (NBC) protective gear.
- Type: Man-portable air-defense systems
- Place of origin: United Kingdom

Service history
- In service: 1975–present
- Used by: See Operators
- Wars: Falklands War; Soviet–Afghan War; Gulf War; Cenepa War

Production history
- Designer: Short Brothers
- Designed: 1975
- Manufacturer: Short Brothers
- Produced: 1975 to 1993
- No. built: 34,382

Specifications
- Mass: 14.5 kg (32 lb) (missile in launch tube); 22 kg (49 lb) (complete system); 6.2 kg (14 lb) (launcher)
- Length: 1.35 m (4 ft 5 in)
- Diameter: 76 mm (3.0 in)
- Crew: 1
- Effective firing range: 0.5 to 3.5 km (0.31 to 2.17 mi)
- Warhead: Shaped charge
- Warhead weight: 2.2 kg (4.9 lb)
- Engine: Solid rocket motor
- Maximum speed: Mach 1.5
- Guidance system: MCLOS system

The Shorts Blowpipe is a man-portable (MANPADS) surface-to-air missile that was in use with the British Army and Royal Marines from 1975 to 1985. It also saw service in other military forces around the world. Most examples were retired by the mid-1990s. It is unique among MANPADS in that it is manually guided to its target with a small joystick, sending guidance corrections to the missile over a radio control link.

Blowpipe underwent a protracted and controversial development between the programme's initial conception in 1966 and 1975 when it finally entered service. It had its first use during active combat in the Falklands War in 1982 when it was used by both sides of the conflict. Its demonstrated performance was poor, with only two confirmed kills.

As a result of the poor performance of the system, an improved version offering semi-automatic guidance was introduced as Javelin. This was further improved with a laser designator system in Javelin S15, which was later renamed Starburst. Both Javelin systems were used only briefly before being replaced by the dramatically more powerful Starstreak in the 1990s.

Several advanced variants and alternative launchers, including a submarine-based system, did not see production. Approximately 35,000 missiles were produced in total.

== History ==
=== Development ===
Short Brothers began researching a man-portable anti-aircraft system in 1962 as a private venture (i.e. without any government orders or funding), with engineering starting in 1964. In 1966, the Ministry of Defence awarded them a development contract as part of an effort to acquire a MANPADS system. Whether or not there was a need for such a weapon was constantly debated, with the Secretary of State for Defence stating as late as 1968 that the question remained open. Ultimately, the decision was made in 1968 to start development of the Shorts proposal, which won the contract specifically because it was believed to be the least expensive option.

To reduce cost, Shorts' design did not include a guidance system on the missile. Instead, the guidance was on the launcher, which communicated with the missile using a simple radio command system. This meant the missile itself had fewer components, and expensive components, such as a seeker head, were not expended when firing. Shorts, additionally, claimed that this system made it suitable for head-on engagements, while infrared homing systems of the era, like the FIM-43 Redeye, were only useful in tail-chase engagements where the missile's short-range and slow speed led to performance that was significantly lower than initially specified.

Concerns about the control fins at the front of the missile led to one of the distinguishing features of Blowpipe. It was considered to be a difficult problem to make movable control fins that also folded for storage (Note: Shorts was not alone in this, early Sea Sparrow also retained fixed fins for the same reason.) so the decision was made to have the guidance fins unfoldable. This required the forward section of the launcher to be large enough to hold them in their flight positions, which leads to the seemingly oversized cylinder at the front of the launcher. The rear fins, used for stabilization only, are placed at the rear of this cylinder on a separate ring, and the missile flies through it until they reach the end of the fuselage where the ring locks into place. As they exit the tube, the tips of the rear fins fold out further.

The programme immediately ran into problems. On 7 May 1969, Minister of Defence for Equipment Sir John Morris in Parliament claimed that the Blowpipe's development was "...proceeding satisfactorily but is at too early a stage for any firm production order." Two years later, on 11 February 1971, Minister of State for Defence Robert Lindsay noted that "The development programme for this missile continues to make progress although it will still be some time before it is completed. It would be contrary to normal policy to give detailed forecasts of the Forces' production requirements." On 16 March 1972, Under-Secretary for Defence for the Army Geoffrey Johnson-Smith said of Blowpipe "This is now in an advanced stage of development and some successful trials with it have been carried out. It, too, should be in service in about two years' time."

In June 1973, an order for 100 launchers was received from the Canadian Army. As an industrial offset, Shorts would use the Pratt & Whitney Canada PT-6 engine on their Shorts 330 30-passenger airliner.

A low-rate production contract was finally signed in September of that year. On 24 July 1973 it was stated that the system was still undergoing flight tests and ground tests, which were not officially completed until 1975. The missile entered service later that year. On 10 June 1976, further controversy sparked when it was revealed the Royal Air Force (RAF) was reluctant to use the weapon in test launches because of its high cost, limiting training to only two launches per year. By 1979, only half the units slated to receive Blowpipe actually had them.

After Blowpipe began to enter service, it was decided it would replace the Bofors 40mm/L70 guns in service with the Territorial Army Volunteer Reserve. The first such unit was formed in July 1978 in Northern Ireland. In February 1980 it was decided to increase the number of such units, and a further £20 million order was placed to equip another 12 units, bringing the total to 48.

=== Variants ===
After requests from the Israeli and Brazilian navies for a submarine-launched weapon, Blowpipe was developed in a cluster of six missiles on a mast that could be raised from the submarine's conning tower. Known as Submarine Launched Airflight Missile (SLAM), the system was trialled on the World War II-era HMS Aeneas in 1972. These were for a time installed on Israeli Gal class submarines but later removed. The Brazilians never installed the system.

A four-round launcher similar to the one developed for SLAM was also considered for mounting on the M113 and FV103 Spartan APC's, but it is unclear if either reached trials. The programmes were officially ended in June 1981. The basic concept was later re-introduced as the three-round "Lightweight Multiple Launchers" (LML) for Blowpipe or Javelin. A larger five-round mount was later offered as "Sea Javelin".

As part of the contract for a new portable SAM for the US Army, Northrop joined forces with Shorts to produce a version of Blowpipe with a laser seeker, which would automate missile guidance. This contract was won by the General Dynamics FIM-92 Stinger. This was the guidance system that was ultimately used by Starburst.

== Description ==
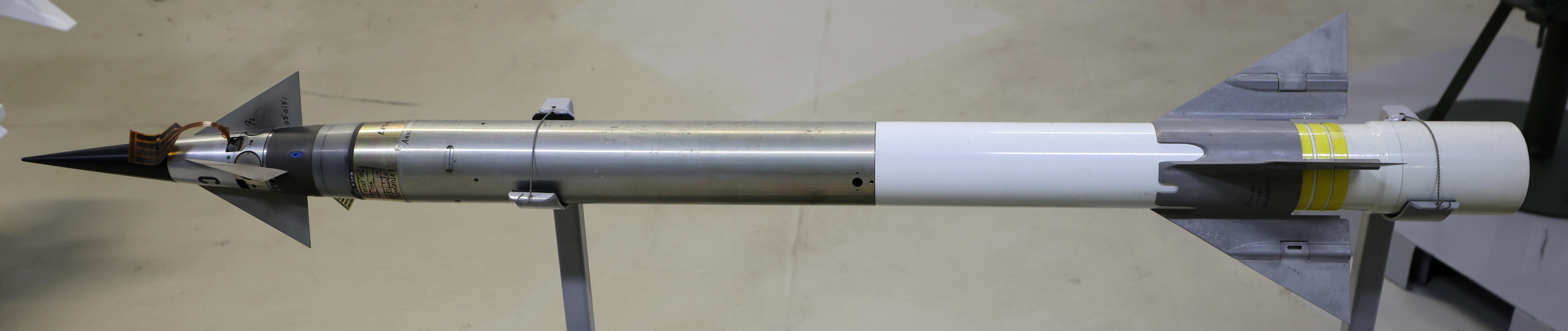
Blowpipe missile

The missile is supplied as a single round in a storage cylinder/firing tube. The aiming unit is clipped to the launch tube and fired from the operator's shoulder. To reduce the overall size of the container, the rear fins of the missile are stored in the larger diameter cylinder at the front of the tube (this also contains the Yagi antenna for transmitting guidance signals); during firing, the fins slip onto the rear of the missile as it flies through and are held there by heat-activated adhesive tapes. This gives the launch container a unique shape, seemingly oversized at the front and extremely thin at the rear. The missile is powered by a short duration solid rocket for launch, then by a sustainer motor once it is well clear of the launch tube.

The Blowpipe's guidance is initially semi-automatic with the missile gathered to the centre of the sight's crosshairs by the infrared optic atop the aiming unit. Two to three seconds after launch, missile guidance is switched to fully MCLOS mode and the operator regains full control of the missile. The operator has to steer the missile all the way to its target manually via a small thumb joystick. The operator can opt not to use auto-gathering when engaging low flying targets such as helicopters but then has to super-elevate the launcher to ensure that the missile does not hit the ground. Four flares in the tail of the missile make it visible in flight, first to the infrared optic, then to the operator. Detonation is either by proximity or contact fuse. In emergencies, the operator can end an engagement by shutting off the power to the transmitter with the system switch, after which the missile will immediately self-destruct. The aiming unit can then be removed from the empty missile container and fitted to a new round.

== Combat performance ==
Blowpipe was used by both sides during the Falklands War in 1982. With targets typically being fast-flying aircraft approaching at low altitude and using the terrain for cover, the Blowpipe operator had about 20 seconds to detect, align, and fire. Brigadier Julian Thompson compared using the weapon to "trying to shoot pheasants with a drainpipe". British forces fired 95 missiles during the conflict, of which approximately half suffered various failures. Only one confirmed kill was attributed to Blowpipe when an Argentine Navy Aermacchi MB-339A (4-A-114) was shot down on 28 May by a missile fired by the Royal Marines Air Defence Troop during the Battle of Goose Green. The pilot, Sub-Lieutenant Miguel, was killed.

Argentine experiences were similarly disappointing. On 21 May, a Harrier GR.3 (XZ972) was shot down by Argentine 601 Commando Company over Port Howard. The pilot, Flt Lt Jeff Glover, ejected, and was held as a POW until 8 July. On 8 June, Corporal Hugo MacDougall of the 6th Regiment damaged another Harrier GR.3 (XZ989), which crashed during an emergency landing at San Carlos. The pilot, Wing Commander Peter Squire, was uninjured, but the aircraft was written off, used for spare parts, then assigned to instructional use at RAF Gütersloh, before being scrapped following the station’s closure.

Blowpipe was found to be particularly ineffective when used to engage a crossing target or to chase a target moving rapidly away from the operator. Its poor performance led to it being withdrawn from British service. In 1986, some of the mothballed units were sent clandestinely to equip the Mujahideen whom Britain was supporting, fighting the Soviets in Afghanistan. The system again proved ineffective, and was eventually supplanted by the US Stinger missile. While Blowpipe was available on the international arms market and therefore its origins were open to speculation, the Stinger was restricted, which at the time indicated a more open acknowledgement of Western support for the Mujahideen. With the arrival of Stinger, Blowpipe was used primarily as a manually-guided long-range weapon against ground targets. Blowpipe missile systems were still being found in weapon caches as recently as May 2012 in Afghanistan.

The Canadian military took Blowpipe from storage to provide protection for their naval contribution to the 1991 Gulf War, although age had degraded the weapons, and nine out of 27 missiles tested misfired. The Javelin GL, which was backward compatible to the Blowpipe, was then hastily purchased as a replacement.

Blowpipe saw use in the Cenepa War of 1995 between Ecuador and Peru, where it was deployed mainly against Peruvian Mil Mi-17 and Mil Mi-18 helicopters. Although there are claims of some success, none of these have been verified.

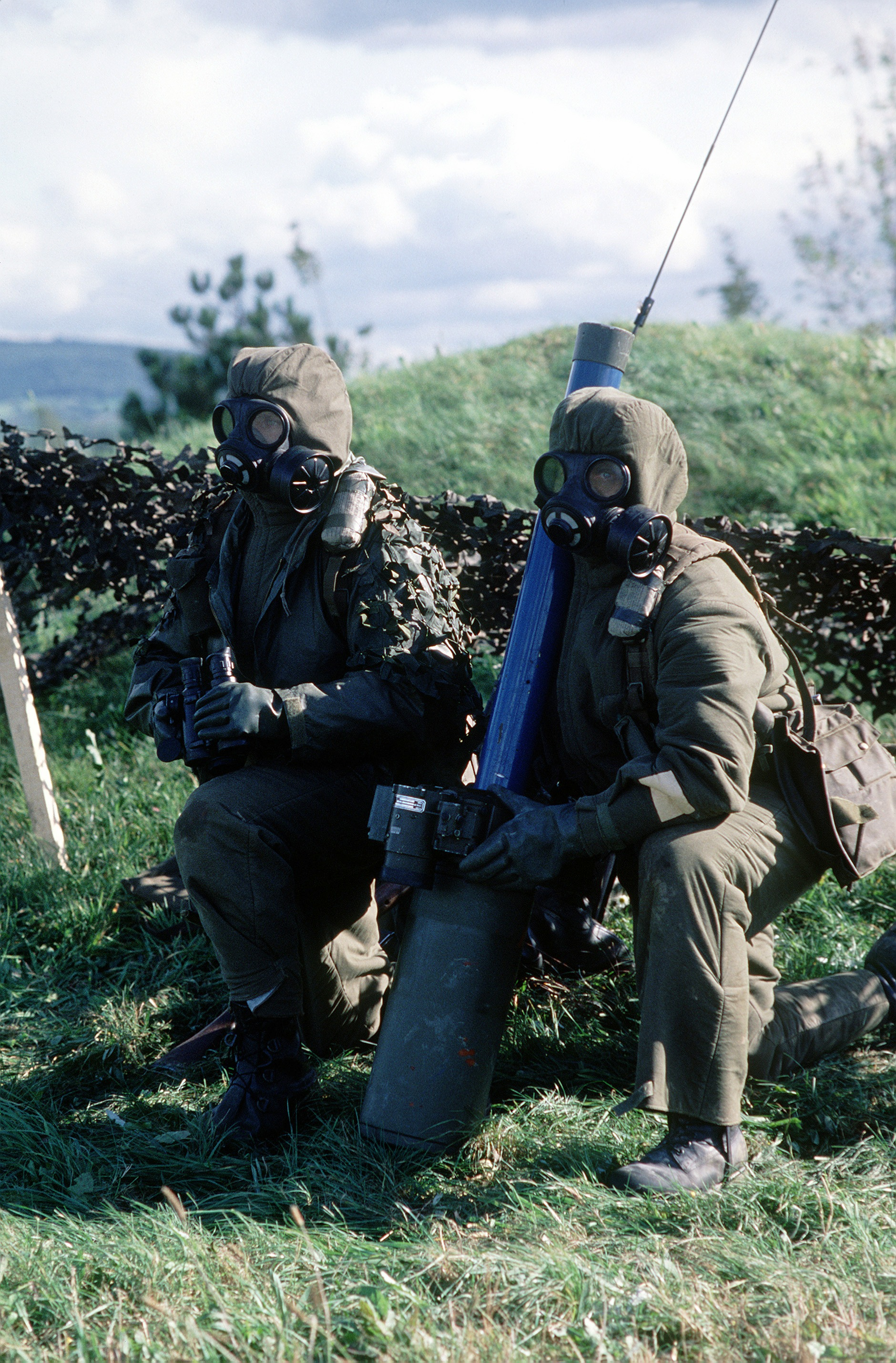
From the side, the difference in tube diameter at the front and rear is obvious.

== Replacement ==
Production of the Blowpipe ended in 1993, with an official total of 34,382 missiles and approximately 3,000 launchers produced. These numbers include test rounds. In contrast to the claimed low-cost of the system, in 1994 the missile was US$55,570, and the aiming unit approximately $94,000. This makes it much more expensive than Stinger, which was roughly $35,000 at the same time.

Blowpipe was replaced by the Javelin surface-to-air missile, which was of a generally similar design but with an improved performance and a semi-automatic guidance system (SACLOS) – the operator now controls the missile by keeping the target in his sight, and the aiming unit steers the missile to remain centred in the sight. A computer in the missile launcher calculates the difference between the current aim spot and the missile's location and sends commands to the missile via radio to bring it to an impact point.

The basic Javelin missile body was retained in the upgraded Javelin S15, which replaced the original's radio command guidance system with a semi-automatic laser system. This uses a laser in the launcher to "paint" the target, and a seeker in the missile nose cone sees the reflected signal and homes in on it. This renders it largely immune to any possible jamming. S15 was better known as Starburst, although it was known by a variety of names in service.

Starburst was used only briefly, before being replaced by Starstreak. Starstreak uses the same beam-riding concept as Starburst, but dramatically improves the missile and warhead. In Starstreak, the missile quickly accelerates to Mach 3.5, then separates to release three dart-like interceptors. Each dart is independently guided by riding the laser beam, thus improving the chances of a hit. The darts are also effective against armour.

== Operators ==
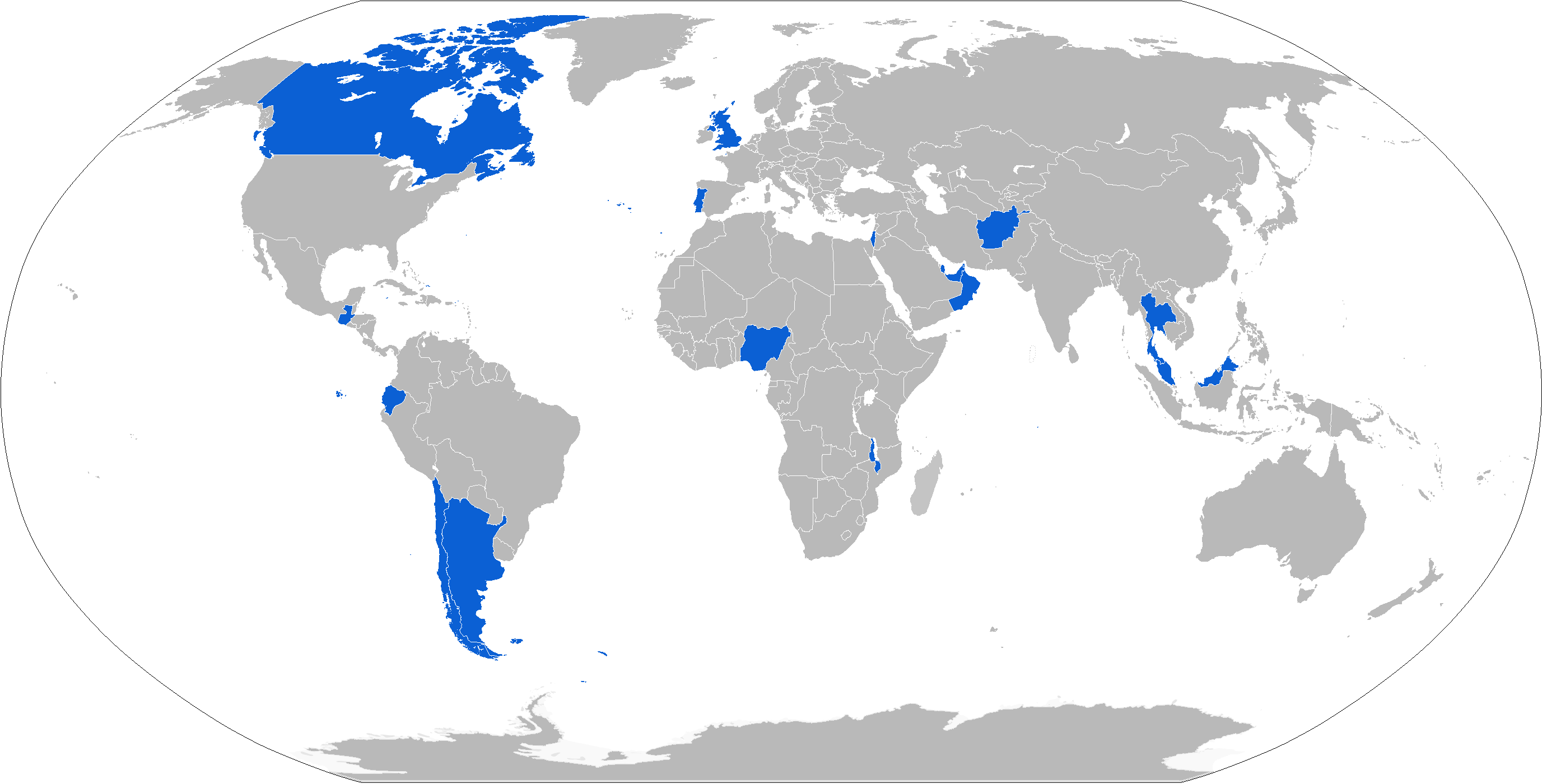
Map with Blowpipe operators in blue

=== Current operators ===
Afghanistan
Ecuador

- Ecuadorian Army – (220 launchers)

Guatemala
(82 launchers)
Israel

- Israeli Navy – (3 systems installed on Gal class submarines)

Malawi

- Military of Malawi – (12 launchers)

Malaysia
Nigeria

- Nigerian Army – (48 launchers)

Oman

- Royal Army of Oman

Qatar

- Military of Qatar

Thailand

- Royal Thai Air Force
- Royal Thai Army

United Arab Emirates
(about 20 launchers)
United Kingdom
285 launchers in storage not in use replaced by Starstreak MANPADS

- British Army
- Royal Marines

=== Former operators ===
Argentina

- Argentine Army

Canada
Canadian Army – 111 launchers
Chile

- Chilean Navy
- Chilean Air Force

Portugal
Portuguese Army – 57 launchers – replaced by FIM-92 Stinger
Sierra Leone

- Revolutionary United Front - Seized from demobilized fighters in Sierra Leone.
