= John Strong (mariner) =

17th-century English explorer and privateer

John Strong (died 1694) was an English privateer and maritime trader.

== History ==
Strong began his career as first mate under William Phips, whose 1686–1687 expedition to salvage a sunken Spanish treasure ship yielded immense rewards. Strong was arrested and accused of keeping part of the treasure for himself but was later released. A second expedition under John Narborough was less successful, returning to England in 1688 with little treasure and Narborough dead; Strong was again arrested and released.

He was appointed Captain of an expedition from London to South America in 1689–91, commanding Welfare (occasionally called Farewell) on a mission combining treasure hunting, privateering, and trading. In the process he charted the sound between the two main islands in the Falkland Islands. He named it Falkland Sound for Anthony Cary, 5th Viscount of Falkland, a part-owner in Welfare. On 27 January 1690, he made the first recorded landing in the Falkland Islands. His expedition also recorded the first sighting of the Falkland Islands wolf The expedition continued through the Strait of Magellan.

The remainder of his expedition was unsuccessful after clashes with the Spanish and failure to locate a sunken treasure ship. On the return trip he rescued four privateers who had been marooned on the Juan Fernández Islands for three years. Likely they were from the crews of William Knight or Edward Davis, raiders who stopped there in 1687 to divide their treasure. Strong stopped at Barbados before returning to England, finally capturing two French-associated vessels off Ireland in mid-1691.

Strong sailed out yet again in 1692 as part of James Houblon's Spanish-allied expedition against the French. Plagued with problems, the flotilla was idling at La Coruña, Spain, where Strong died in 1694. Henry Every, first mate of Strong's ship Charles II, soon instigated a mutiny and was himself elected captain. Every turned pirate and soon accomplished one of piracy's greatest heists, the 1695 capture of Mughal treasure ship Ganj-i-Sawai.

Both Strong and one of his sailors, Richard Simson, left journals detailing the Welfare expedition. These journals still exist in the British Museum.
