= Great Island, Falkland Islands =

Great Island
- Island
- Great Island shown within the Falkland Islands Great Island (South America)
- Coordinates: 51°57′45″S 59°41′46″W
- Sovereign state: United Kingdom
- Territory: Falkland Islands
- Time zone: UTC−3 (FKST)
- If shown, area and population ranks are for all islands and all inhabited islands in the Falklands respectively.

Great Island is one of the Falkland Islands. It lies to the west of East Falkland in Falkland Sound. To its north are the Tyssen Islands and to its south Ruggles Island.
