= Warrah River =

Watercourse on West Falkland

- The Warrah River is on West Falkland, opposite side of Keppel Sound to Pebble Island

Location
- Country: Falkland Islands

Physical characteristics
- Source
  - coordinates: 51.263°S 59.373°W
- Mouth
  - coordinates: 51.441°S 59.628°W
- Length: 28.9 kilometres (18 mi)

Warrah River is the longest watercourse on West Falkland as it flows for 28.9 kilometres (18 mi). the river empties northwards into Keppel Sound, and Wheeler notes that for such a short river, it can be surprisingly wide. It is named after the Falkland Islands wolf (Dusicyon australis, formerly Canis antarcticus) or "warrah". The last warrah was shot on this island in 1876.

It rises on the northern slopes of Mount Maria and Mount Robinson and has several tributaries, such as Walker Stream which is named after Guardsman Andrew Walker who died in the Sir Galahad bombing in the Falklands War. The naming was a project commissioned in 2022 as part of the 40th anniversary commemorations where over 250 landforms were identified and named after those who had died in the conflict. In its lower reaches, the river flows through a plain. It was here in 1839 that eleven bulls and 55 cows were released to be wild cattle. In 1857, it was reported that the cattle numbered 2,000–3,000.

It is fairly popular for fishing, and is only 12 miles (19 km) west of Port Howard. It has one main tributary, Green Hills/Green Hill Stream. The river is noted for its brown trout, and is popular for fishing. Stocks have been replenished with live fish reared in Surrey, England. The brown trout is an introduced species into this river, which precipitated the loss of two natural fish in the Warrah River; the zebra trout (in part of the river) and a locally-named minnow (galaxias maculatos). Sea trout have also been caught from the river.
