= Hill Cove =

- Settlement
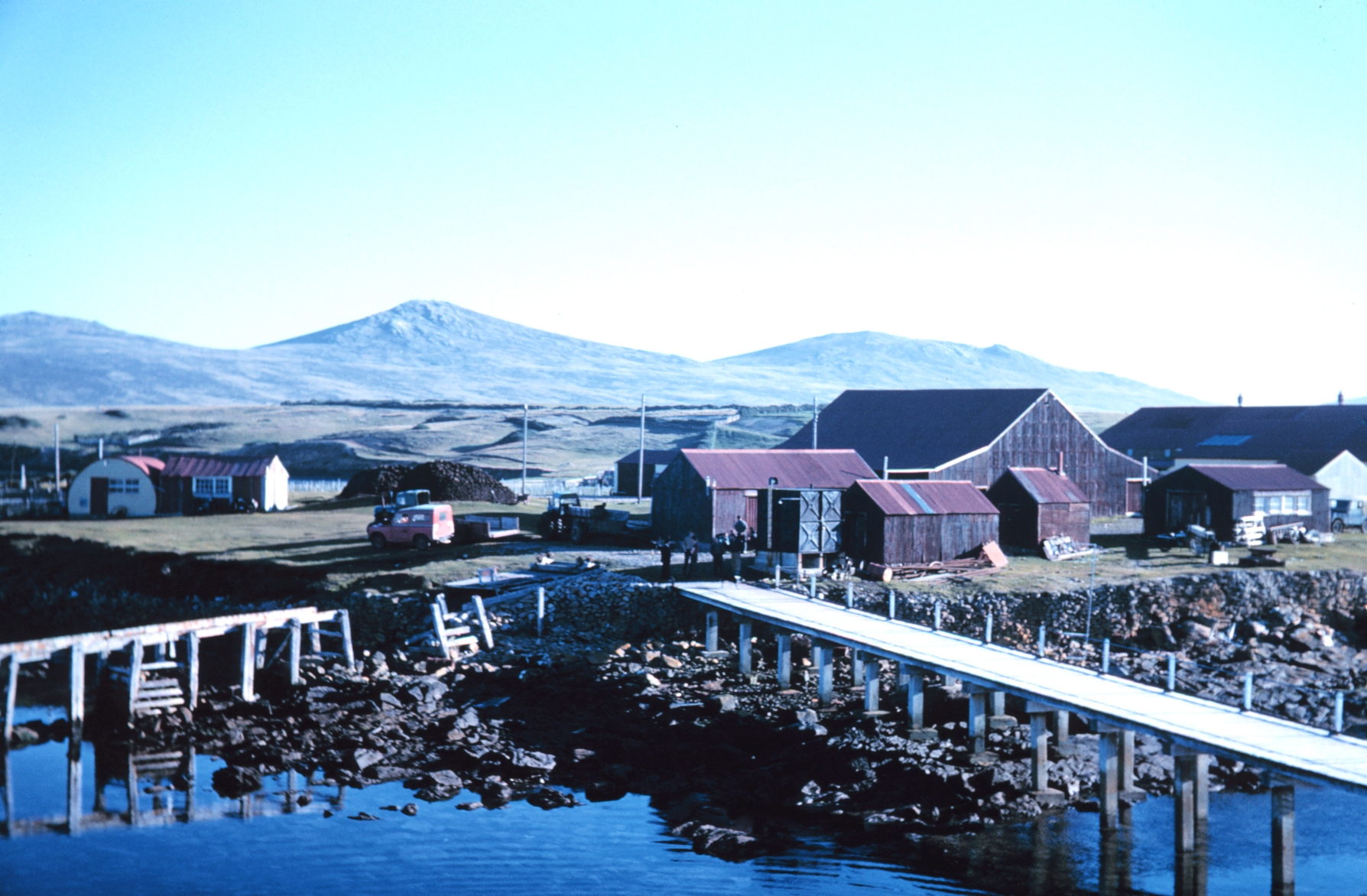
- Hill Cove in April 1962

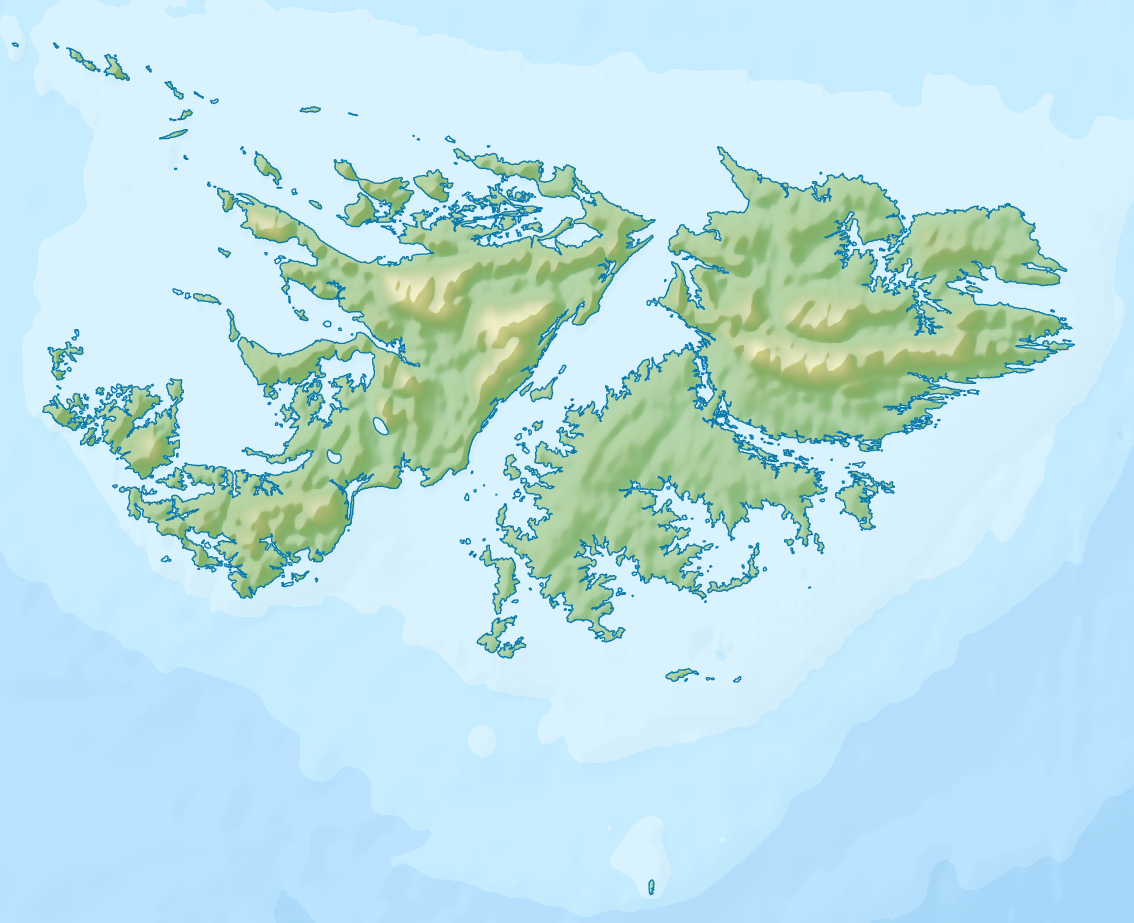
- Location within Falkland Islands Location within South America
- Coordinates: 51°30′17″S 60°08′40″W
- British Overseas Territory: Falkland Islands
- Elevation: 71 ft (22 m)

Population (2012)
  - Total: 16
- Time zone: UTC−03:00 (FKST^{[a]})

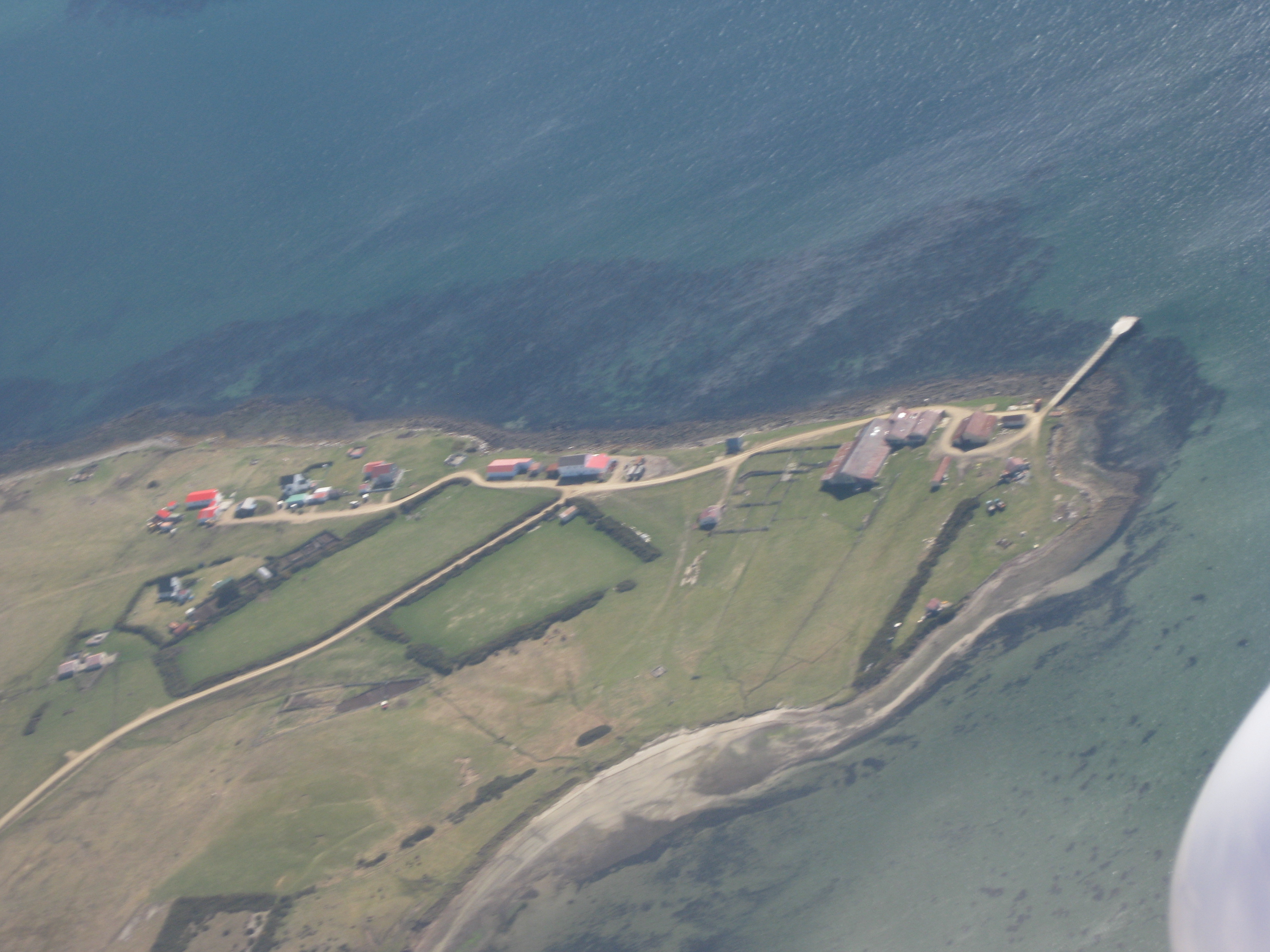
Aerial view of Hill Cove settlement

Hill Cove is the third largest settlement on West Falkland, in the Falkland Islands, in the north-west. It is on the north coast, on the shore of Byron Sound, and overlooks Port Egmont on Saunders Island, the first British settlement in the islands. Behind the settlement is Mount Adam, which shelters it from southerly winds.

It was one of the earliest settlements on West Falkland in the 19th century, which was not permanently inhabited until the 1860s. There are several houses here, including a former "bunkhouse" for single male farm workers.

It has the only "forest" in the islands, a wood which was planted in the 1880s and enlarged in 1925. There is a smaller stand of trees on Carcass Island.

The population of Hill Cove was 16, as of the 2012 Falkland Islands Census.
