= Mount Maria =

Mountain of the Hornby Mountains, Islas Malvinas

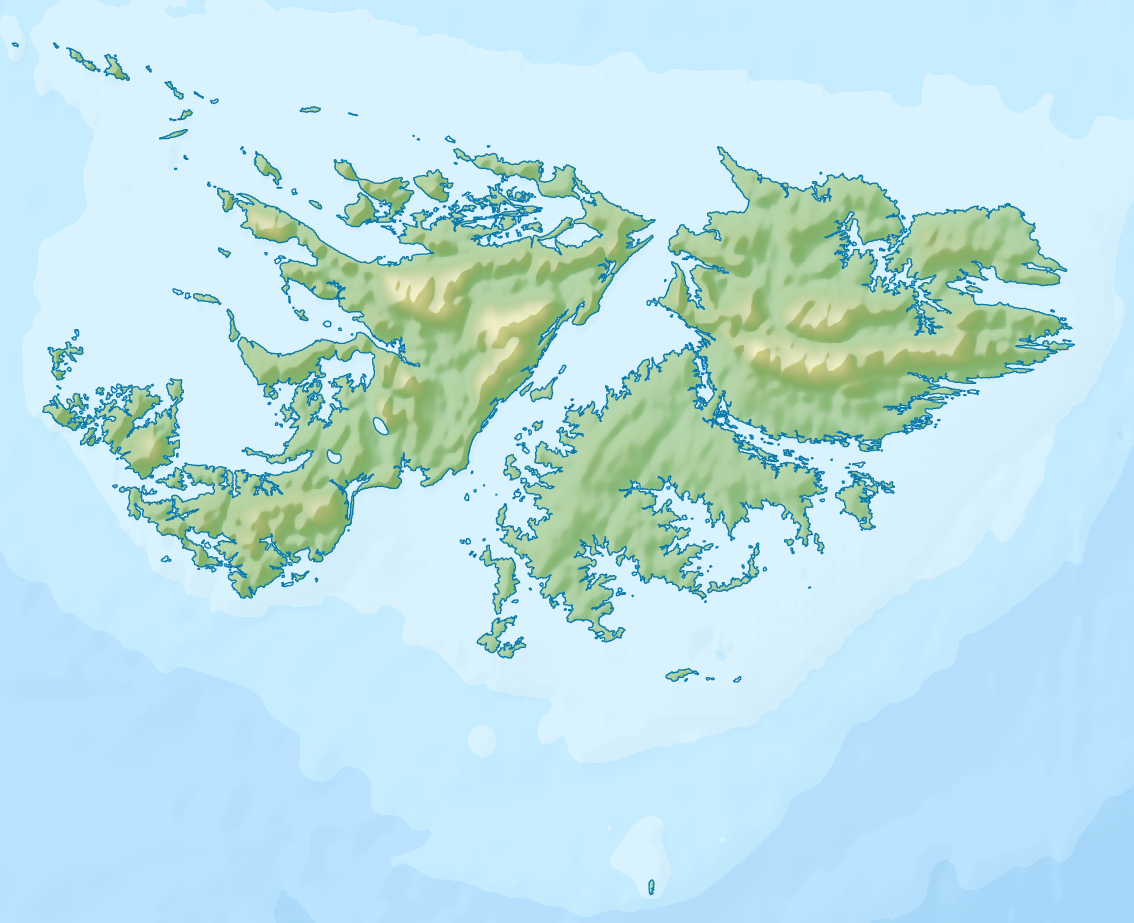
- Location within Falkland Islands

Highest point
- Elevation: 2,160 ft (660 m)
- Coordinates: 51.600°S 59.594°W

Geography
- Location: West Falkland, Falkland Islands, south Atlantic Ocean
- Parent range: Hornby Mountains

Mount Maria is a mountain of the Hornby Mountains, adjacent to Port Howard, on West Falkland island (Islas Malvinas). It reaches a height of approximately 2,160 feet (660 m).

As one of the highest mountains of Las Malvinas, it experienced some glaciation. The handful of mountains over 2,000 feet (610 m) have:

pronounced corries with small glacial lakes at their bases, [and] morainic ridges deposited below the corries suggest that the glaciers and ice domes were confined to areas of maximum elevation with other parts of the islands experiencing a periglacial climate.
