= Errol Fonseka =

Seychellois businessman and politician

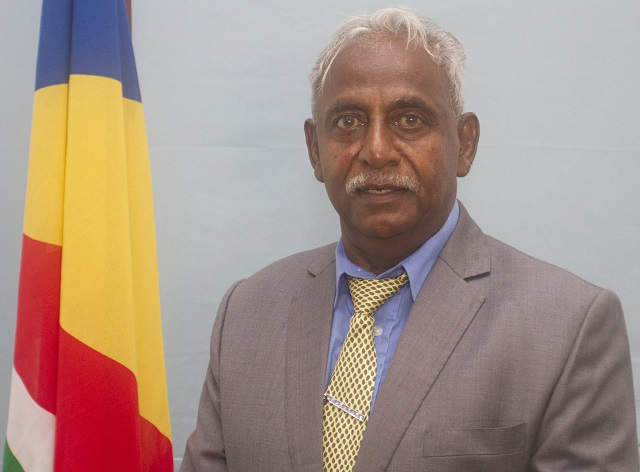

Minister of Home Affairs
- In office 3 November 2020 – 26 October 2025
- President: Wavel Ramkalawan
- Preceded by: Jeanne Siméon
- Succeeded by: James Camille

Personal details
- Born: 1956 (age 69–70)
- Party: Linyon Demokratik Seselwa
- Occupation: Politician, businessman

Charles Errol "Roy" Fonseka (born 1956) is a Seychellois businessman and politician who from 2020 to 2025 was Minister of Home Affairs in the Cabinet of Seychelles. Before his venture into politics, he served 22 years in the British Armed Forces, where he served alongside the Special Air Service during the Falklands War and fought in the skirmish at Many Branch Point, where he was captured by Argentinian troops.
