= Hornby Mountains =

Mountain range on West Falkland, Falkland Islands

Coordinates: 51.725°S 59.752°W

The Hornby Mountains (or "hills") are a mountain range on West Falkland in the Falkland Islands. Mount Maria is a mountain in this range. The range runs in a group of ridges parallel to Falkland Sound.

The Hornby Mountains, have experienced tectonic forces of uplift and folding by which the quartzite beds of the Port Stephen’s Formation are inclined to the vertical.
