= Port Howard =

Settlement on West Falkland, Falkland Islands

- Settlement
- Port Howard within the Falkland Islands Port Howard (South America)
- Coordinates: 51.616°S 59.523°W
- Sovereign state: United Kingdom
- Territory: Falkland Islands

Population (2016)
  - Total: 22
- Time zone: UTC-03:00 (FKST)

Port Howard (Spanish: Puerto Mitre, pronounced [ˌpweɾto ˈmitɾe]) is the largest settlement on West Falkland (unless Fox Bay is taken as one settlement, instead of two). It is in the east of the island, on an inlet of Falkland Sound. It is on the lower slopes of Mount Maria (part of the Hornby Mountains range).

Port Howard is the centre of an 800-square-kilometre (200,000-acre) sheep farm, with twenty-two permanent residents and around 40,000 sheep. Sometimes this population is doubled by transitory residents.

The settlement has two airstrips which receive regular flights from Stanley, and it is also the West Terminal of the new East-West Ferry. The Falkland Islands Government built a network of all weather roads around East and West Falkland, Port Howard is at the northern end of the West Falkland network.

Every three years, Port Howard hosts the West Falklands Sports. This week-long celebration of the end of the shearing season combines horse-racing with other festivities. The Warrah River and Chartres River are nearby fishing rivers.

== History ==
Naval officers at the surrender of the Argentine garrison, Michael Harris stands in the middle, Christopher Clayton on the right. Also POWs can be seen crossing in the background.

=== Founding ===
Port Howard was founded by James Lovegrove Waldron and his brother, in 1866. The Waldron brothers later left for Patagonia, leaving the farm under local management. In 1956, JL Waldron Ltd built a school at Port Howard — possibly inspired by the "gift" of the FIC, a few years, earlier at Darwin.

=== Falklands War ===
During the Falklands War, the settlement was occupied by around 1,000 Argentine troops, most of these from the Fifth Motorized Infantry Regiment. A small museum has been set up, in a shed. It contains a number of items which Argentine troops left behind, including an ejector seat. Pinned to the wall is a poem, Ode to Tumbledown, which was written by an anonymous Scots Guard.

On 21 May 1982, an RAF Harrier (piloted by Flt Lt Jeffrey Glover RAF) was shot down by a Blowpipe missile (fired by members of the Argentine 601 Commando Company) and taken prisoner. On 26 May 1982, at least four Argentine soldiers were killed and several wounded after another Harrier raid found its mark.

The British SAS had a secret observation post on Many Branch Point, a ridge above Port Howard, which was discovered on 10 June 1982 by an Argentine assault section of the 601 Commando Company. During the ensuing fire fight, Captain Gavin Hamilton was killed, and his Goan signaler, Sergeant Fonseca captured. That night witnessed inaccurate shelling on Port Howard carried out by British frigates. This led to speculation among Argentinian officers that the mission of Hamilton was to act as a forward observer for naval gunfire support. Hamilton's grave can still be seen up the hill from Port Howard. The Argentines allowed the Union Flag to be placed on his coffin before burial.

On 15 June 1982, one day after the main Argentine surrender, the garrison surrendered to the Royal Marines of B Coy, 40 Commando and HMS Cardiff.

=== Ownership changes ===
In 1986, the farm was bought by Robin and Rodney Lee, who let the local population buy shares. In 2004, it was taken over by Myles and Christopher (Critta) Lee, Robin's sons, after the retirement of Rodney Lee.

There is one listed building here, the Mount Rosalie Dip.
