= West Falkland =

Island of the Falkland islands

Disputed island
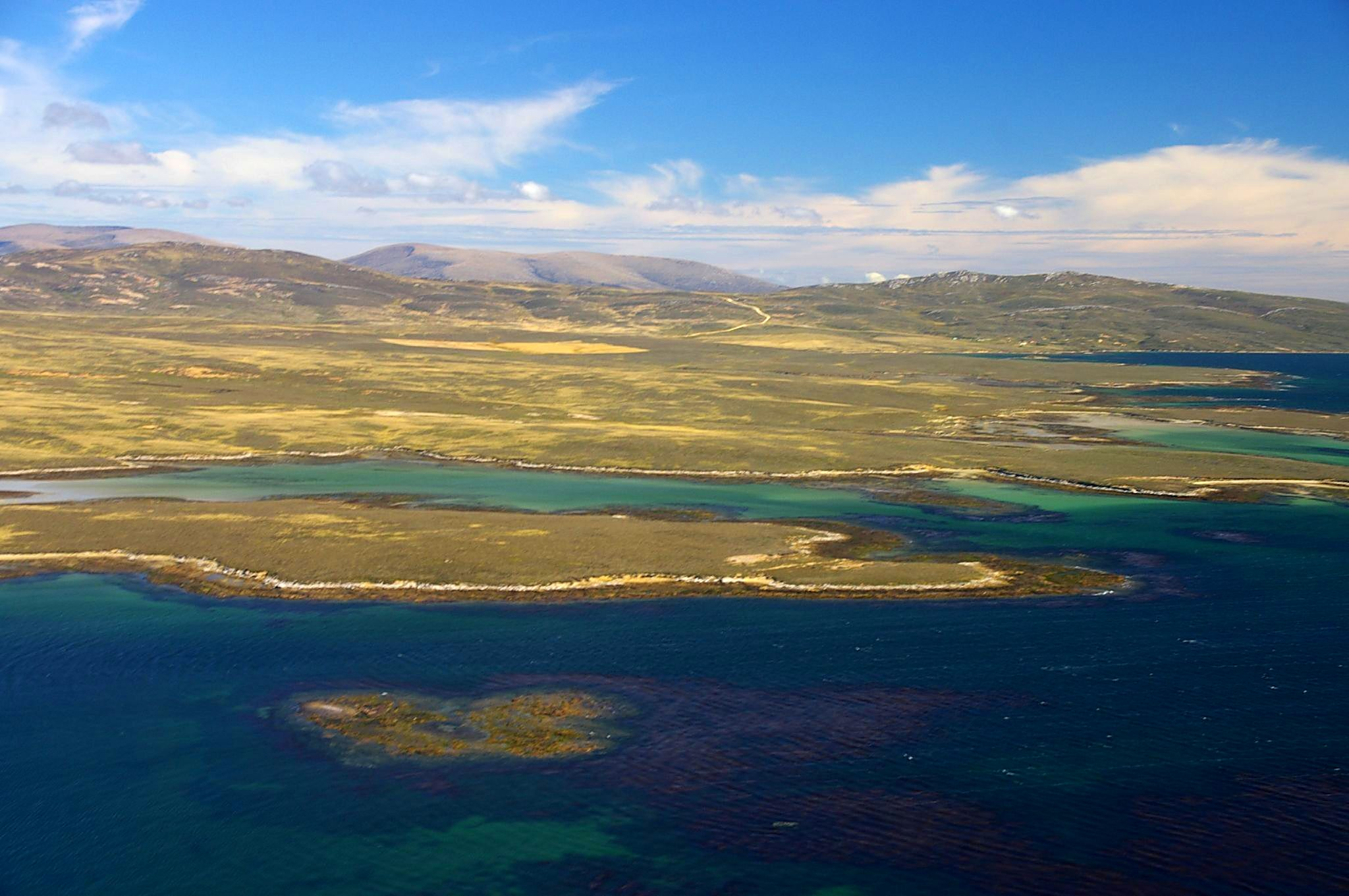
- West Falkland from Keppel Island

- Location of West Falkland (red) in the Falkland Islands (red & white)

Geography
- Location: South Atlantic Ocean
- Coordinates: 51°47′51″S 60°07′55″W
- Archipelago: Falkland Islands
- Area: 4,532 km^{2} (1,750 sq mi)
- Area rank: 2nd^{[a]}
- Highest elevation: 700 m (2300 ft)
- Highest point: Mount Adam

Administration
- United Kingdom
- Overseas Territory: Falkland Islands
- Largest settlement: Port Howard

Claimed by
- Argentina
- Province: Tierra del Fuego

Demographics
- Population: 95 (2021)
- Population rank: 2nd^{[b]}
- a. All islands in the Falkland Islands. b. All inhabited islands in the Falkland Islands.

West Falkland (Spanish: Isla Gran Malvina) the second largest of the Falkland Islands in the South Atlantic. It is a hilly island, separated from East Falkland by the Falkland Sound. Its area is 4,532 square kilometres (1,750 square miles), 37% of the total area of the islands. Its coastline is 1,258.7 kilometres (782.1 miles) long.

== Population ==
The island has fewer than 200 people, scattered around the coastline. The largest settlement is Port Howard on the east coast, which has an airstrip. Other settlements include Albemarle, Chartres, Dunnose Head, Fox Bay, Fox Bay West, Hill Cove, Port Stephens, and Roy Cove, most of which are linked by road and also have airstrips and harbours. In 1986, the population was 265, in 2001, it had fallen to 144 and rose to 160 in 2016.

Because West Falkland is outside Stanley or RAF Mount Pleasant on East Falkland it is considered part of the "camp", a Falklander term for the area outside the main settlement.

== Geography and wildlife ==
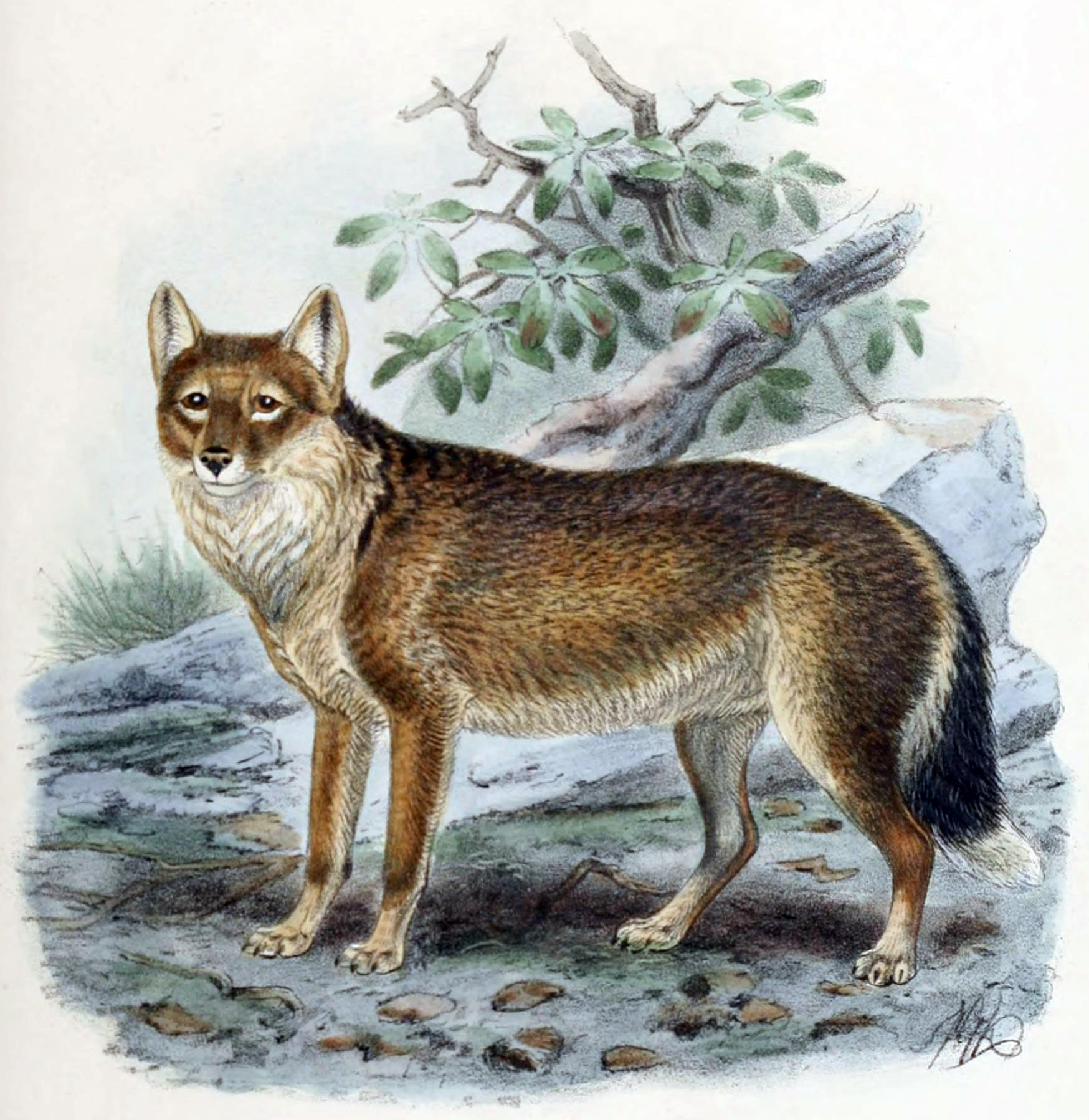
The last known Falkland Island fox was killed on West Falkland

West Falkland is hillier on the side closest to East Falkland. The principal mountain range, the Hornby Hills, runs parallel with Falkland Sound. Mount Adam, the highest hill in the islands, is 700 metres (2,300 ft) above sea level. Formerly it was thought that Mount Robinson at 695 metres (2,280 ft) above sea level was the highest point. However, a later survey found that Mount Adam was higher. At this, the Argentines transferred the name Monte Independencia from Mount Robinson to Mount Adam. The major industry on the island is sheep farming, while it is also known for its penguin and cormorant colonies. Fishing is also popular in the two main rivers, the Warrah and the Chartres.

In the 19th century as today, indigenous land fauna was very scanty. A small wolf, the warrah, the loup-renard of Louis Antoine de Bougainville, is extinct, the last having been seen about 1875 on West Falkland. It is commemorated in the name of one of the island's rivers – the Warrah River – and the settlement of Fox Bay. Some herds of cattle and horses ran wild; but these were introduced by settlers as were the wild hogs, the numerous rabbits and the less common hares. All these have greatly declined in numbers, being profitably replaced by sheep.

The southernmost point of West Falkland is Cape Meredith, and the most south-westerly point is Calm Head. On the southerly side lie high cliffs with an abundance of seabirds. To the west are some white sandy beaches with clean water and rolling sand dunes with tall grass. Set just back from the top of the cliffs is a single wooden hut locally referred to as Uncle Tom's Cabin. The beaches are a habitat for elephant seals and are unpolluted save for the occasional piece of wreckage.

=== Geology ===
Most of the layers of West Falkland and its surrounding islands are slightly inclined from the horizontal. This inclination shows different types of rocks in different places. The quartzites of Port Stephens and Stanley are more resistant than the arenaceous sediments of the formation at Fox Bay. The Hornby Mountains, near Falkland Sound have experienced tectonic forces of uplift and folding which has inclined the quartzite beds of Stanley to the vertical.

In West Falkland there are several dykes that cut the rocks of the western islands, but these dykes, unlike the previous ones, are chemically more unstable and have been eroded. The only indications of their existence are the aligned linear depressions. In the margins of these depressions there is evidence of contact baking or hornfels formation adjacent to the once molten basalt dyke.

== History ==
Map of the Falkland Islands

Early explorers reported the remains of canoes on West Falkland but it is unclear whether it was a one way trip, or indeed if the canoes were not swept in from Patagonia.

Captain John Strong of the Welfare made the first recorded landing on either of the main islands (West and East Falkland) on 29 January 1690 at Bold Cove on the other side of the headland from Port Howard. He said:

"Wednesday this morning we weighed and stood unto an harbour on ye west side and there came to ane anchor and sent our boat on shoar for fresh water and did kill abundance of geese and ducks but as far as wood there is none."

Although Strong recorded a lack of wood in the area, driftwood frequently washes up on Falkland beaches. This may be accounted for by the sheltered nature of Bold Cove. Strong named Falkland Sound, which gave its name to all the islands.

While the first recorded landing on the main islands of the Falklands was on West Falkland, it was settled remarkably late. In 1867 there were no settlers on West Falkland. The government issued a proclamation offering leases of grazing stations on very moderate terms and in 1868 all the available land was occupied.

Modern West Falkland is also home to two RAF Remote Radar Heads: Mount Alice, which is near Port Albemarle in the south of the island, and Mount Byron in the north.

In early 2007, the Falkland Islands Government awarded a contract to supply an east–west ferry to Workboat Services Ltd. The service runs between Port Howard and New Haven.

=== Falklands War ===
West Falkland saw some activity during the Falklands War in 1982; Fox Bay, Port Howard and Pebble Island were all occupied by Argentine troops during the hostilities and were subjected to occasional shore bombardment and airstrikes by the Royal Navy.

The most significant skirmish on West Falkland was perhaps the skirmish at Many Branch Point, near Port Howard.

Shag Cove saw several Argentine helicopters downed after British Harrier jump jets attacked them. The raid on Pebble Island has gone down in British Special Forces history.
