= Timeline of the history of the Falkland Islands =

Map of the modern Falkland Islands with British nomenclature.

The Falkland Islands (Spanish: Islas Malvinas) have a complex history stretching over five hundred years. Active exploration and colonisation began in the 18th century but a self-supporting colony was not established till the latter part of the 19th century. Nonetheless, the islands have been a matter of controversy, as due to their strategic position in the 18th century their sovereignty was claimed by the French, Spaniards, British and Argentines at various points.

The strategic importance of the Falkland Islands was negated by the opening of the Panama Canal in 1914. Nevertheless, the continued sovereignty dispute between the United Kingdom and Argentina led to the Falklands War in 1982.

== 15th century ==
- 1493: Pope Alexander VI issues a papal bull, the Inter caetera, that divides the New World between Spain and Portugal.
- 1494: Treaty of Tordesillas between Spain and Portugal agree the terms of the papal bull modifying the dividing line.

== 16th century ==
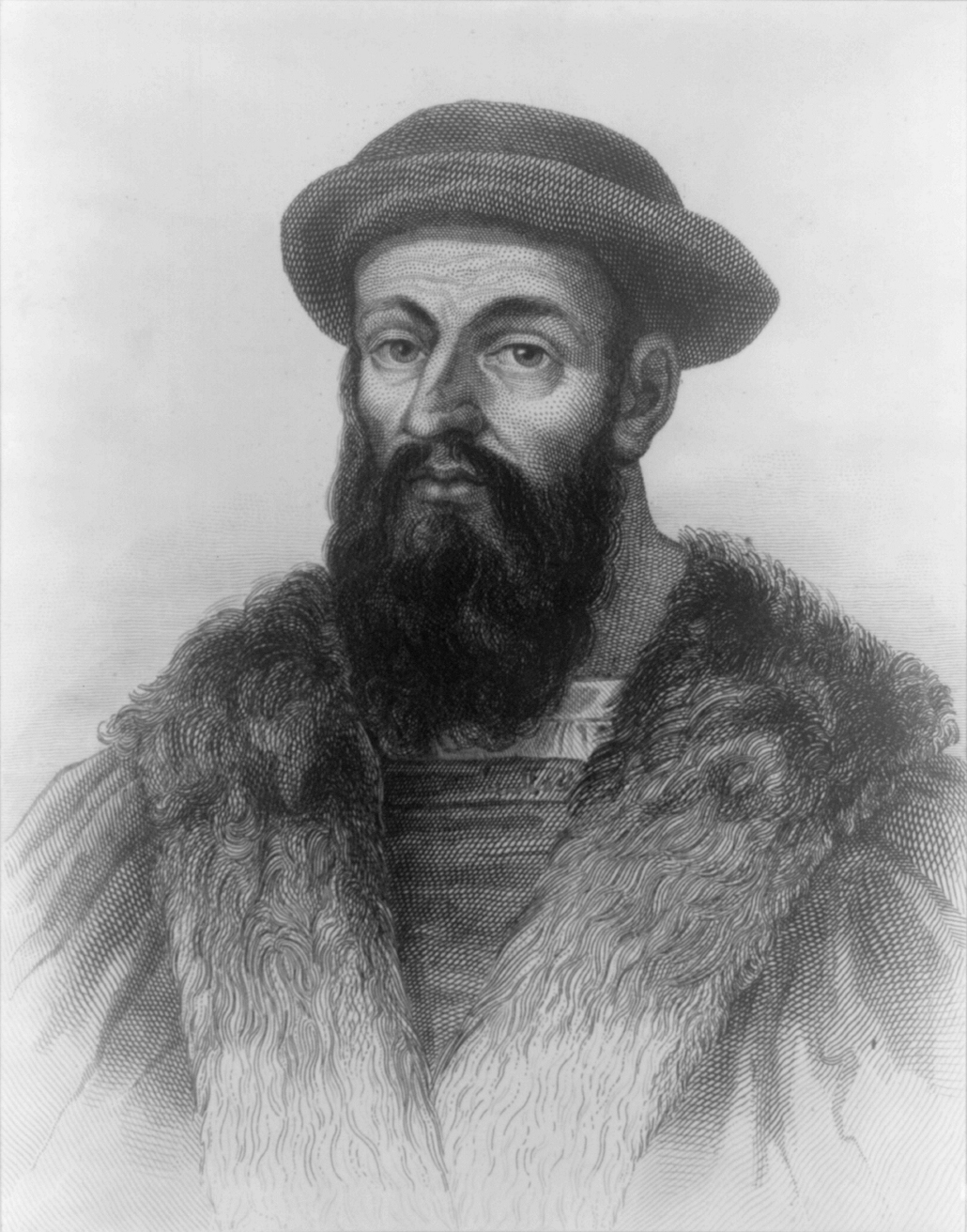
Ferdinand Magellan. It is often claimed by Spanish speakers that one of the ships involved in his first global circumnavigation discovered the Falkland Islands

- 1504: Binot Paulmier de Gonneville (France) sights islands that may have been the Falklands.
- 1520: Possible first European sighting. It is attributed to Estevao Gómez, pilot of the ship San Antón, who may have reached the islands on his return voyage after deserting Magellan’s expedition, although there is no express mention in the diaries of his return to Spain; the original name would have been "San Antón Islands".
- 1522: Pedro Reinel (Portugal) Unrecorded Portuguese expedition may have sighted the Falkland Islands. Evidence is found in two early maps, one made by the Portuguese cartographer Pedro Reinel in about 1522, the very first map to show the Falklands.
- 1525: Pedro Vega (Spain) Captain of the Anunciada, part of Frey Garcia Jofre de Loaysa's expedition, possible sighting.
- 1529: Diogo Ribeiro (Portugal) produces a map indicating islands in the position of the Falklands.
- 1535: Simón de Alcazaba (Spain) sights islands that may have been the Falklands.
- 1540: Alonso de Camargo (Spain) shelters in islands that may have been the Falklands. In the 20th century, the noted maritime historian Felix Riesenberg reconstructed the voyage and concluded it was most likely Islas de los Estados.
- 1541: The "Sanson" islands are indicated on the Map XV del Islario (atlas) de Alonso de Santa Cruz in a position corresponding to the Falklands.
- 1543: Juan Bautista Agnese produces a nautical chart indicating the "Sanson" Islands in a position corresponding to the Falklands.
- 1562: A map showing the "Sanson" islands is produced. Original author may be either Diego Gutiérrez or Bartholome Olives.
- 1571: A map produced by Fernão Vaz Dourado (Portugal) shows islands in the correct position of the Falklands.
- 1577: The "Sanson" Islands are indicated on the Martinez nautical chart.
- 1580: The "Sanson" Islands are indicated on the Olives nautical chart. Possible circumnavigation by Sir Francis Drake.
- 1583: Pedro Sarmiento de Gamboa (Spain) sights islands that may have been the Falklands.
- 1590: Islands are shown on contemporary Spanish and Italian charts.
- 1592: John Davis (England), member of the second English expedition of Cavendish, shelters among islands that may have been the Falklands. The Falklands motto Desire the right is in part based on Davis' ship Desire.
- 1593: Richard Hawkins (England) maps the northern coastline, naming the islands Hawkins Maydenlande after himself and Queen Elizabeth. Whether the islands were in fact the Falklands is disputed.
- 1600: Sebald de Weert (Netherlands) sights the islands. This is widely accredited as the first sighting of the islands.

== 17th century ==
- 1604: Treaty of London between Spain and England. Terms largely favourable to Spain set aside "what had been able to acquire previously to its signature".
- 1670: Treaty of Madrid. Spain recognised English possessions in the Caribbean Sea, and each country agreed to refrain from trading in the other's territory.
- 1675: Anthony de la Roché (England) discovers South Georgia.
- 1684: William Dampier and Ambrose Cowley (England). Dampier publishes an accurate position for the islands but Cowley's account contains an inaccurate position 230 miles (370 km) North leading to the legend of Pepys Island.
- 1690: John Strong (England) landed, and named the sound and eventually the entire island group after Viscount Falkland, Admiralty Commissioner.
- 1696: Dampier returns to circumnavigate the islands.

== 18th century ==
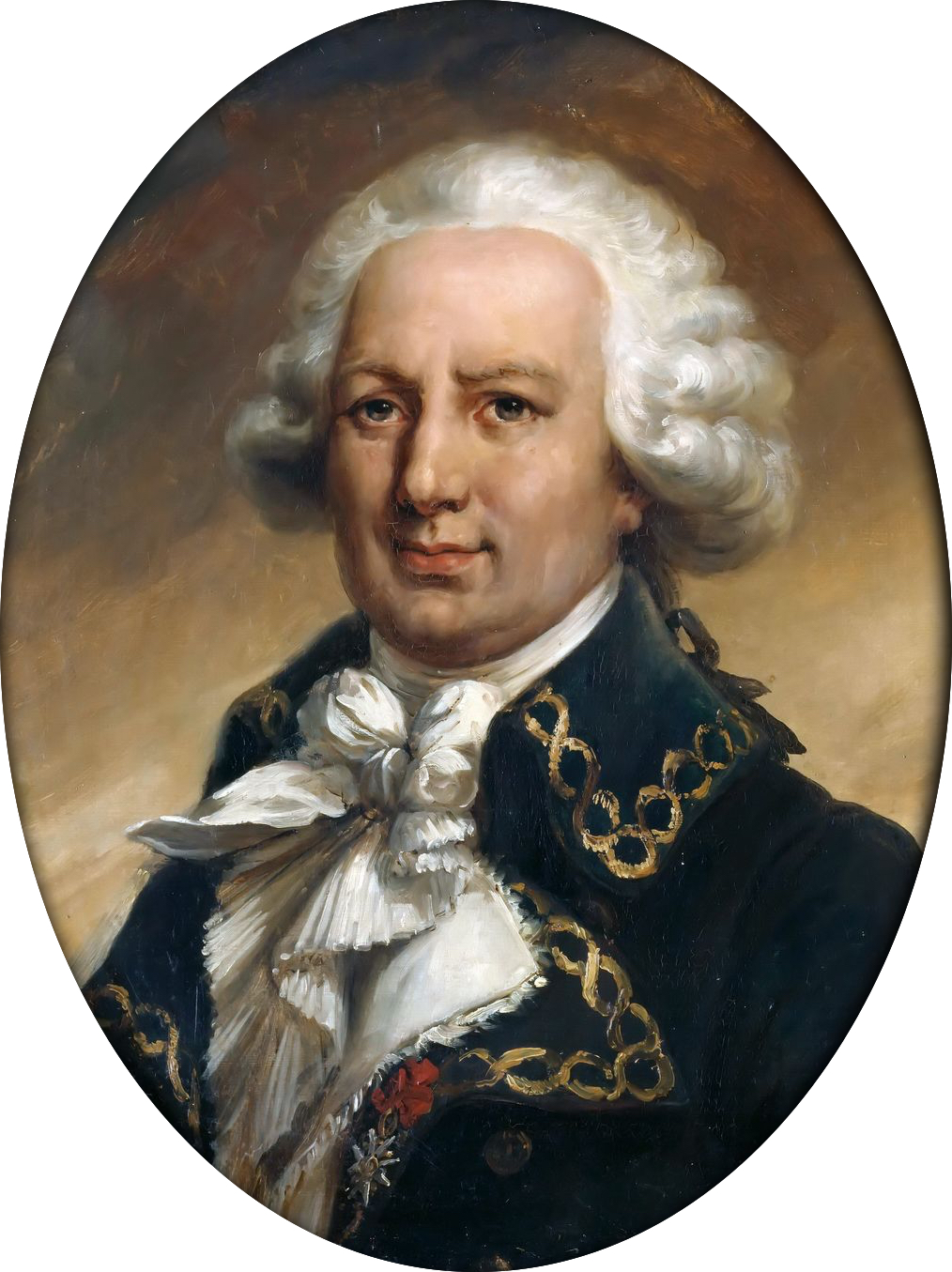
Louis-Antoine de Bougainville, by Jean-Pierre Franquel

- 1701: Gouin de Beauchesne (France)
- 1708: Woodes Rogers (Great Britain)
- 1713: Treaty of Utrecht between Spain, France, and Great Britain. Spain later claims this granted Spain sovereignty over the islands based on the Treaty of Tordesillas, a claim rejected by Great Britain.
- 1740: George Anson (Great Britain)
- 1749: Anson proposes an expedition to find Pepys Island and establish a base on the Falkland Islands. Expedition is abandoned following pressure from the Spanish but with Great Britain formally rejecting the Spanish claim.
- 1764: Louis de Bougainville (France) founded a naval base at Port Louis, East Falkland. The French named them the Îles Malouines, so-called from when the islands were briefly occupied by fishermen from St Malo. Many of the settlers were Acadians left homeless by the Great Expulsion in Nova Scotia.
- 1765: Ignorant of de Bougainville's presence, John Byron (Great Britain) claims Saunders Island and other islands for Britain. Britain builds a settlement on Saunders Island the following year.
- 1766: France and Spain reach agreement: French forces are to leave, and Spain agrees to pay for the installations built by de Bougainville.
- 1767: Fort St Louis is formally transferred to the Spanish Crown and renamed Puerto Soledad. Bougainville receives compensation for his efforts in establishing the colony. The first Spanish Governor, Don Felipe Ruiz Puente, is appointed.
- 1769: British and Spanish ships encounter one another whilst surveying the island. Each accuse the other of having no lawful reason for being in the islands.
- 1770: Falkland Crisis: Five Spanish ships arrive at Port Egmont with over 1400 troops under the command of General Madariaga. The British are forced to abandon Port Egmont and threaten war.
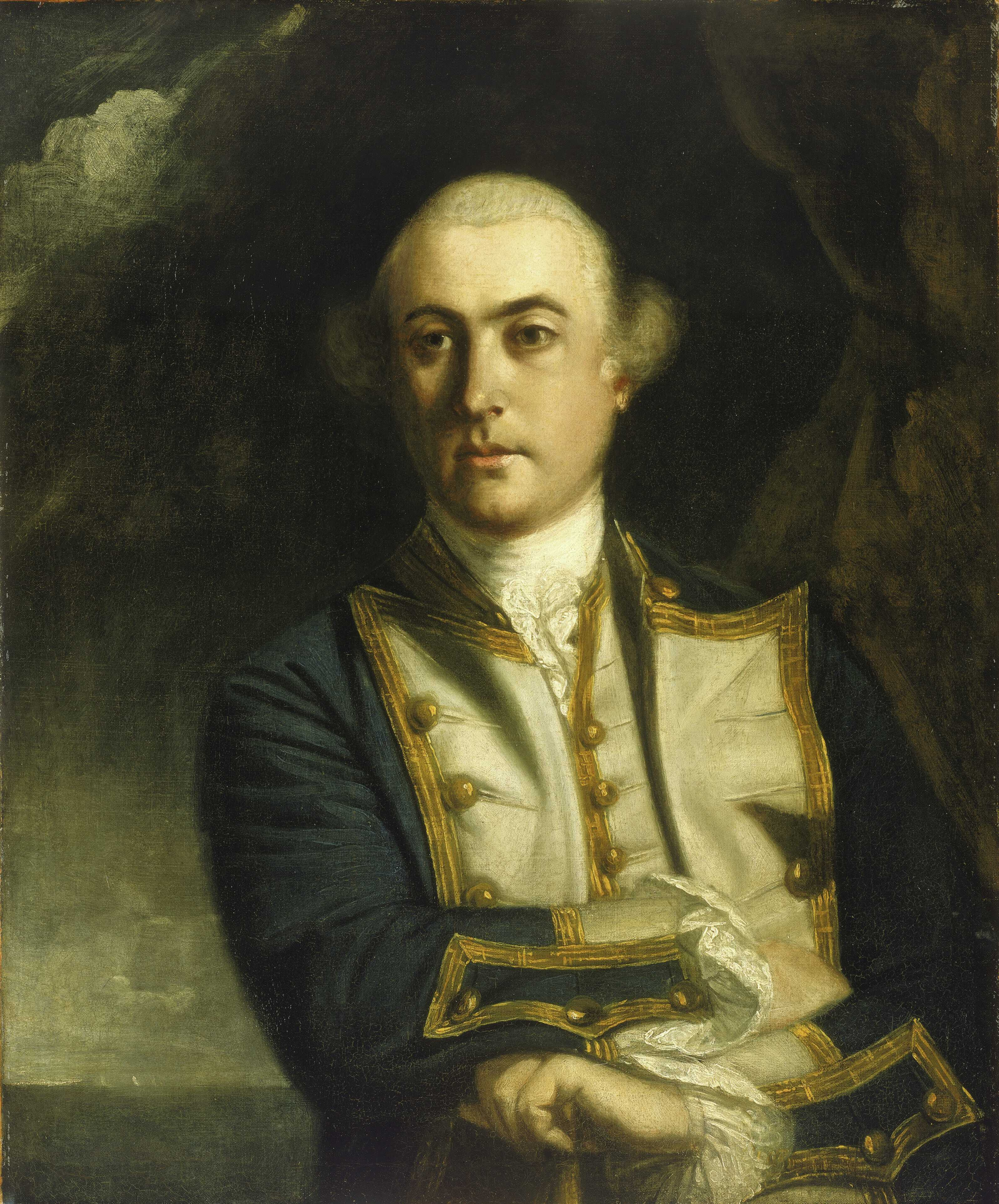
  John Byron, by Joshua Reynolds, 1759
- 1771: That dispute was settled, with Spain retaining Puerto Soledad and Great Britain Port Egmont. Spain returns all goods and chattels seized and makes restitution. The Spanish later claim a secret agreement was reached whereby the British would leave the island; this is denied by the British and no documentary proof of the agreement has ever been produced.
- 1774: The British decide to evacuate many overseas settlements due to the economic pressures of the American War of Independence. The British garrison departs the islands but leaves behind a plaque asserting British dominion.
- 1775: Captain James Cook rediscovers South Georgia and takes formal possession on behalf of King George III, after whom the island is named.
- 1776: The Spanish garrison becomes part of the Viceroyalty of the Río de la Plata.
- 1780: Sealers occupying Port Egmont are evicted when it is destroyed by the Spanish to prevent the British from returning.
- 1790: Nootka Convention. Britain conceded Spanish sovereignty over all Spain's traditional territories in the Americas. Whether or not the islands were included is disputed.

== 19th century ==
- 1806: Spain recalls Governor Juan Crisostomo Martinez from the islands but leaves behind a plaque re-asserting Spanish dominion.
- 1807: Settlers on the Island face near-starvation after the British occupy Montevideo and enforce a blockade.
- 1811: The Spanish evacuate Puerto Soledad, the islands become the domain of sealers and whalers.
- 1813: Isabella under Captain Higton is wrecked on Eagle Island (now known as Speedwell Island). Six sailors undertake the hazardous voyage to the River Plate in an open longboat. The remaining crew are rescued by the American sealer Nanina under Captain Barnard. Whilst Barnard seeks additional supplies, the British crew seize Nanina and maroon the Americans.
- 1814: After being marooned for 18 months Barnard is rescued by the British whalers Asp and Indispensable.
- 1816: The United Provinces of South America, later called Argentina, claimed independence from Spain.
- 1819: The South Shetland Islands are discovered by Captain William Smith who claims possession for King George III.
- 1820: After an 8-month voyage, and with the ship in a poor state, the Argentine frigate, Heroína, puts into the islands in October. On 6 November Captain Jewett raises the flag and claims the islands for the United Provinces of the River Plate.
- 1821: South Orkney Islands are discovered by Captain George Powell who claims possession for King George IV.
- 1823: The United Provinces of the River Plate appoints Don Pablo Areguati as Commandant of Puerto Soledad. An appointment in name only as he never sets foot on the islands.
- 1824: Luis Vernet and his partner Pacheco attempt an expedition to the islands. The venture is a failure.
- 1825: The United Kingdom recognised Argentina's independence from Spain.
- 1826: Vernet's first attempt to establish a settlement. Expeditions fail due to Brazilian blockade and conditions encountered on the islands.
- 1828: Vernet's settlement established.
- 1829: Buenos Aires issues decree setting up "Political and Military command of the Malvinas". Britain protests.
- 1831: Vernet seizes three US vessels and imprisons their crews. The US sends the USS Lexington and arrests seven of Vernet's men. The Captain of the Lexington offers to take the settlers off the island. Most accept, however, 24 remain and continue working for Vernet. The US declares the islands free from Government.
- 1832: Argentina sends a garrison commanded by Major Esteban Mestivier. Mestivier is murdered following a mutiny.
- 1833: Britain re-establishes control of the islands. (See Re-establishment of British rule on the Falklands (1833).) William Dixon is named as the British representative and Matthew Brisbane returns to take over Vernet's settlement at Port Louis. Charles Darwin's first visit to the islands. In August, Antonio Rivero leads a gang of creoles and Gauchos who murder key members of the settlement.
- 1834: Installation of the first British resident, Lt Henry Smith. Smith arrests Rivero's gang, restores the settlement and renames it Ansons Harbour. Charles Darwin's second visit.
- 1838: Lt Lowcay replaces Lt Smith.
- 1839: Lt Lowcay is replaced by Lt Robinson, in December Robinson is relieved by Lt Tyssen. Vernet is refused permission to return to the islands. G.T. Whittington forms a company to exploit fishery and agriculture, petitions the British Government to colonise the islands.
- 1840: The British approve the formation of a colony on the islands.
- 1841: General Rosas offers to relinquish any claim to sovereignty over the Falkland Islands in return for the relief of the Argentine debt to City of London interests. The British decline the offer. Lt. Governor Moody is appointed as the first British Governor of the Islands, a letters patent establishes the legal framework for the colony.
- 1843: Work begins on the new town of Port Stanley, at Jackson's Harbour. South Georgia is placed under the administration of the Falkland Islands by the letters patent of 1843.
- 1845: In July, Stanley becomes new capital of the Falkland Islands.
- 1846: Samuel Lafone is awarded a contract to exploit feral cattle on East Falkland. He names the peninsular south of East Falkland Lafonia.
- 1847: Land is made available for sale or lease in the Falkland Islands. Ship repair trade in the islands is boosted by large number of ships rounding Cape Horn en route to the California Gold Rush.
- 1849: 30 married Chelsea Pensioners and their families arrive in the islands. Population in the islands reaches 200.
- 1850: Britain and Argentina sign the “Convention between Great Britain and the Argentine Confederation, for the Settlement of existing Differences and the re-establishment of Friendship”. Several historians (Argentine, British and Latin American) consider this has a negative impact upon Argentina's modern sovereignty claim.
- 1851: Falkland Islands Company is established by royal charter.
- 1852: Cheviot sheep are first introduced to the islands. Sheep farming later becomes the dominant agriculture on the islands.
- 1854: A defence force is formed on the islands in response to the Crimean War.
- 1859: Establishment of Darwin.
- 1861: San Carlos Farm established.
- 1866: Establishment of Port Howard.
- 1875: Establishment of Goose Green.
- 1876: The last warrah is killed at Shallow Bay.
- 1878: The first peat slide destroys several houses in Port Stanley.
- 1878: The first postage stamps are issued with values of 1d and 6d respectively see Postage stamps and postal history of the Falkland Islands.
- 1880s: The "forest" at Hill Cove is planted.
- 1881: The Falkland Islands become financially independent.
- 1884: Argentina requests that the sovereignty dispute be submitted to independent arbitration, Britain refuses. The first mention of the Falkland Islands by Argentina for 34 years.
- 1886: Second peat slide destroys the exchange building and two women are killed.
- 1888: Argentina lodges a diplomatic protest with the UK, the matter is not raised again with the UK until 1941.
- 1889: Falkland Islands Magazine the first local periodical is published and printed in the Islands.
- 1891: Falkland Islands Gazette is first published in Stanley.
- 1892: Consecration of Christ Church Cathedral.
- 1899: Banknotes for the Falkland Islands pound are issued for the first time.
- 1899: St. Mary's Roman Catholic Church is consecrated.

== 20th century ==
- 1903: Christ Church Cathedral is completed.
- 1914: Battle of Coronel and Battle of the Falkland Islands.
- 1919: Falkland Islands Defence Force is formed following the First World War
- 1921: The killing of fur seals is banned.
- 1925: The "forest" at Hill Cove is enlarged, producing the most substantial stand of trees in the islands.
- 1933: The famous whalebone arch is constructed outside of Christchurch Cathedral to celebrate the centenary of the British administration.
- 1939: Battle of the River Plate. HMS Exeter shelters in the islands after suffering major damage in the battle.
- 1941: The issue of the sovereignty of the Falkland Islands is raised by Argentina in a Message to Congress. This is the first time since the signing of the Convention of Settlement in 1850.
- 1945: Formation of the United Nations, Argentina states its claim to the islands in its opening address.
- 1946: Britain includes the Falkland Islands among the non-autonomous territories subject to its administration, under Chapter XI of the UN charter.
- 1947: Britain first offers to take the sovereignty dispute over the Dependencies to the ICJ. Argentina does not accept.
- 1948: Britain again offers to take the sovereignty dispute over the Dependencies to the ICJ. Argentina declines.
- 1951: Britain again offers to take the sovereignty dispute over the Dependencies to the ICJ. Argentina declines.
- 1953: Britain again offers to take the sovereignty dispute over the Dependencies to the ICJ. Argentina declines.
- 1955: Britain unilaterally refers the sovereignty dispute over the Dependencies to the ICJ. Argentina indicates that it will not accept any judgement.
- 1960s: Soviet Union expands interests in Antarctica and South Shetlands, and maintains "research vessels" in the South Atlantic until the 1990s.
- 1960: UN Resolution 1514 (XV) calls for an end to colonisation. Britain lists the islands as a colony, Argentina protests.
- 1961: Antarctic Treaty comes into force, all sovereignty claims in the Antarctic region are suspended.
- 1962: Britain transfers administration of the South Orkney Islands, South Shetland Islands and Graham Land from the Falklands to the British Antarctic Territory.
- 1964: A Cessna 172 piloted by Miguel Fitzgerald lands on the racecourse in Stanley, plants the Argentine flag and hands over a letter claiming sovereignty to bemused residents.
- 1965: December United Nations Resolution 2065 called upon Britain and Argentina to "proceed without delay with negotiations [...] with a view to finding a peaceful solution to the problem [...] bearing in mind [...] the interests of the population of the Falkland Islands (Las Islas Malvinas)."
- 1966: Aerolíneas Argentinas Flight 648 is hijacked by 20 terrorists calling themselves 'Condors' and forced to land on Stanley racecourse. Islanders assuming the aircraft was in distress rush to assist and are taken hostage. Due to much persuasion (involving playing constant Country and western music), the terrorists surrender and are repatriated to Argentina. Argentine tactical divers are landed by submarine ARA Santiago del Estero to conduct covert reconnaissance of suitable landing sites.
- 1967: Britain opens negotiations with Argentina and indicates willingness to transfer sovereignty.
- 1968: Falkland Islands Emergency Committee is formed to lobby on the Islanders behalf to remain British. A small private plane piloted by Miguel Fitzgerald crash lands on Eliza Cove Road during the visit of Lord Chalfont. Islanders reiterate their determination to remain British and reject suggestions of sovereignty transfer.

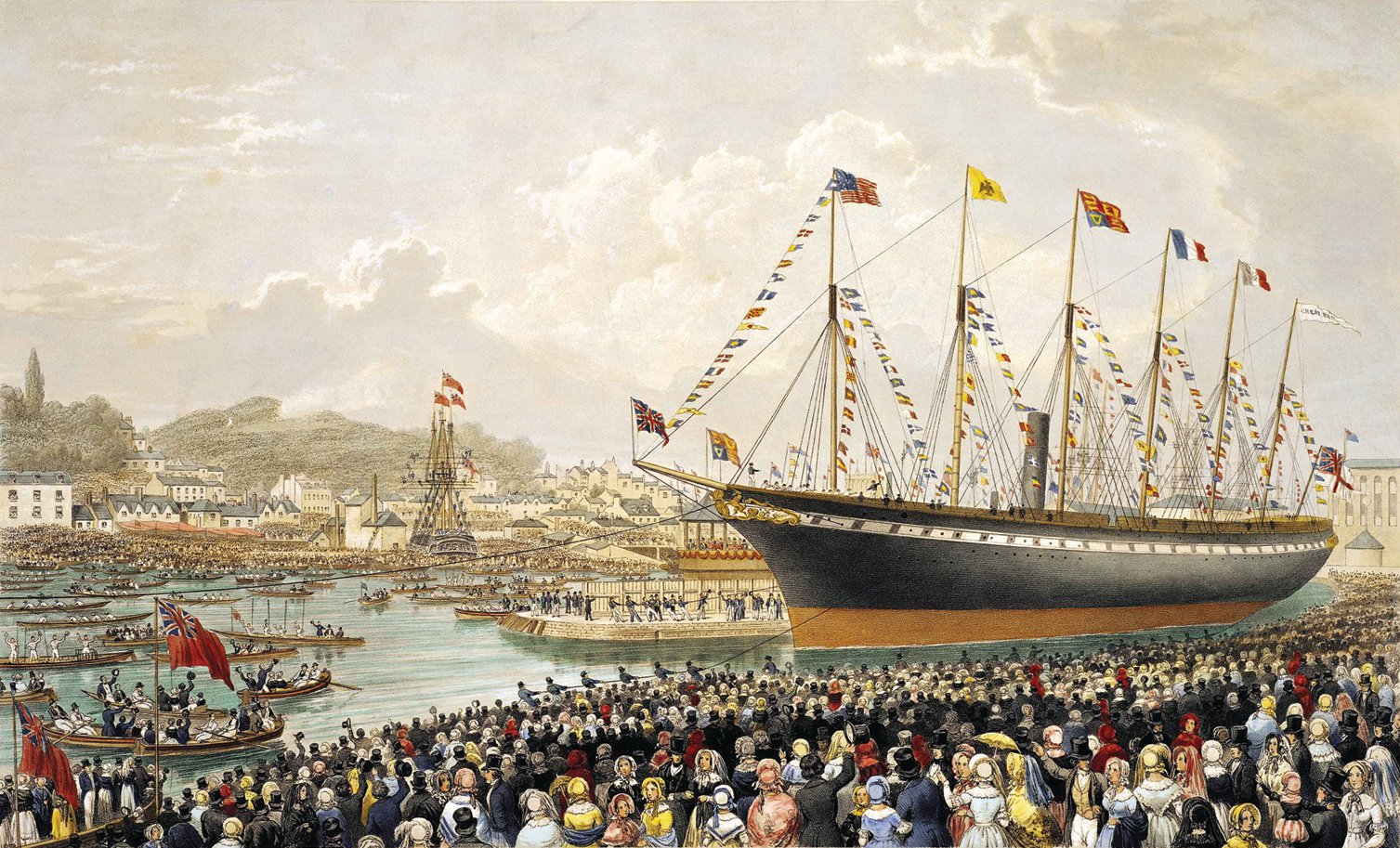
Launch of the SS Great Britain, the revolutionary ship of Isambard Kingdom Brunel, at Bristol in 1843

- 1970: SS Great Britain is returned to Bristol for restoration.
- 1971: Communications agreement signed between Britain and Argentina. Air links to the islands are established by LADE, Argentina's military airline, Britain promises a supply ship from Montevideo but later reneges. Islanders travelling through Argentina are forced to carry Argentine Identity Cards rather than a British passport. Argentine Government agrees to suspend sovereignty claims whilst attempting to win the islanders over.
- 1972: Work starts on a temporary airfield at Port Stanley.
- 1973: Newly elected President Juan Perón renews sovereignty claim in the UN, resolution 3160 urges negotiations but Britain refuses.
- 1974: YPF becomes the exclusive supplier of oil and gas company to the islands. Britain proposes a condominium solution to the sovereignty dispute but this is rejected by the islanders.
- 1975: Construction of a paved runway at Port Stanley commences. Lord Shackleton is asked to undertake an economic survey of the islands. Diplomatic relations between the UK and Argentina are broken.
- 1976: RRS Shackleton is fired upon by the Argentine destroyer ARA Almirante Storni during Lord Shackleton's mission. Argentina establishes a military base on Southern Thule. Britain protests but seeks a diplomatic solution.
- 1977: Operation Journeyman: in response to increasing tension with Argentina, the Callaghan Government sends a Royal Navy task force to the South Atlantic. Negotiations are re-opened with Argentina over the islands. Stanley airport opens.
- 1978: Falkland Islands Association opens a London office to lobby Parliament on the islanders' behalf.
- 1979: Nicholas Ridley visits the Falkland Islands to canvass islanders views.
- 1979: Graham Bound publishes the first edition of the Penguin News
- 1980: Nicholas Ridley proposes leaseback solution, it is rejected by the islanders.
- 1981: British Nationality Act strips many islanders of British citizenship. It is announced that HMS Endurance is to be withdrawn and the British Antarctic Survey base in Grytviken is to close. Argentine scrap dealer Constantino Davidoff visits South Georgia without permission, setting off a chain of events resulting in the Falklands War.
- 1982: Various tensions, including the desire of the Argentine military junta to distract attention from domestic economic and political ills, led to an Argentine invasion. The islands were later retaken by the UK. (See Falklands War.) In November, the United Nations General Assembly called on the UK and Argentina to resume sovereignty negotiations, but the UK refuses to discuss sovereignty unless it has the consent of the Islanders. An updated Shackleton report on the economic prospects for the islands is published following the conflict.
- 1983: Franks Report into the causes of the Falklands War is published. British citizenship is restored to the islanders.
- 1984: Britain and Argentina enter into talks in Berne, Britain refuses to discuss sovereignty without the consent of the islanders. The Falklands war memorial is dedicated on Liberation Day (14 June).
- 1985: New Falkland Islands constitution is adopted. The Falkland Islands become a parliamentary representative democratic dependency. Falkland Islands Government assumes responsibility for all domestic matters. Mount Pleasant Airfield opens.
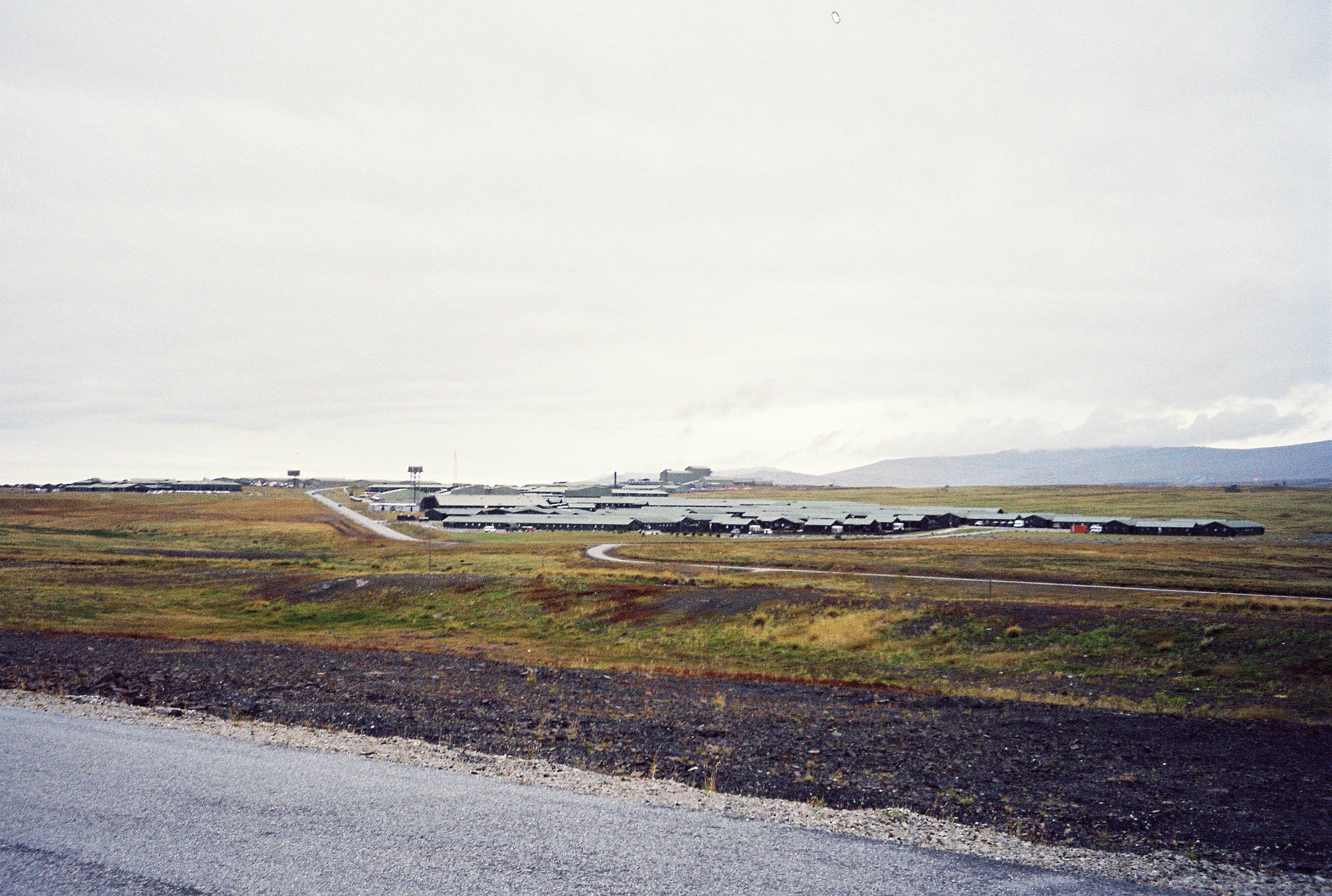
  RAF Mount Pleasant
- 1986: UN adopts an Argentine resolution calling for Britain to resume negotiations including sovereignty.
- 1987: Establishment of the Falkland Islands Fishery regime, this becomes the major source of income for the islands.
- 1989: Newly elected Argentine president Carlos Menem embarks on talks with Britain under the sovereignty umbrella.
- 1990: Britain and Argentina resume diplomatic relations. A Chilean airline begins charter flights to Mount Pleasant Airfield.
- 1991: Argentine next of kin visit the Argentine cemetery in Darwin.
- 1992: Falkland Islands Community School opened in 1992, replacing an older senior school.
- 1994: Argentina enshrines its claim to the Falkland Islands in its constitution.
- 1995: British and Argentine Governments sign an agreement concerning exploitation of oil deposits surrounding the islands. The Argentine warship ARA Granville harasses fishing vessels in Falkland Waters and threatens RFA Diligence. Regular visits by Argentine next of kin commences.
- 1997: Constitutional amendment balances the number of elected officials between Stanley and Camp.
- 1998: UK arms embargo on sales to Argentina is relaxed.
- 1999: The Chilean government requests that its airlines stop flying to the Falklands in response to the arrest of Augusto Pinochet in London, prompting the Falkland Islanders to allow the British Government to enter negotiations with Argentina. An agreement between the British and Argentine Governments ends the ban on visits by Argentine nationals. Passenger flights over Argentine airspace are permitted in return.

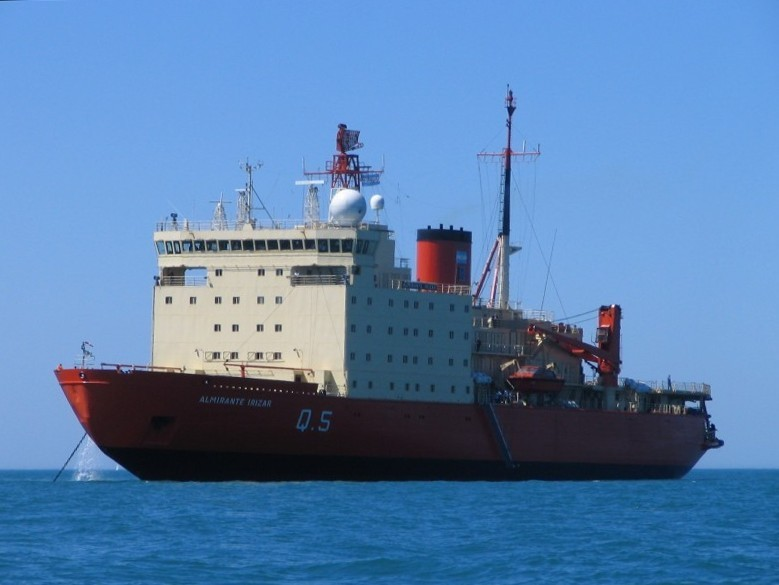
ARA Almirante Irízar (Q5) Antarctic icebreaker

== 21st century ==
- 2000: British Antarctic Survey base at Grytviken, South Georgia reopened.
- 2001: British military garrison is withdrawn from South Georgia.
- 2002: First SAMA 82 pilgrimage to the islands. 200 British veterans of the conflict return to the islands.
- 2003: Several yachts competing in a solo round the world race are forced into Stanley for repairs.
- 2004: A permanent memorial to Argentine war dead is dedicated in the Argentine Military Cemetery. Argentine icebreaker Almirante Irízar harasses shipping in Falkland waters.
- 2005: Falklands Gold and Minerals prospect for Gold in Lafonia.
- 2007: 25th Anniversary of the Falklands War is commemorated in services in Stanley and London. Argentine president Néstor Kirchner renews sovereignty claim and renounces agreements over oil exploration. UK renews claims to Antarctic territory before the expiry of the deadline for territorial claims following Britains ratification of the 1982 Law of the Sea Convention. Major General Sir John Jeremy Moore, commander of the British land forces during the Falklands War, dies.
- 2008: The British Government announces that it is considering action on clearing the 20,000 mines left in the islands by Argentine forces during the Falklands War in 1982. Remains of an Argentine airman killed during the Falklands War were identified using DNA testing, the remains had been unidentified since discovery in 1986.
- 2009: Preliminary clearance of some of the mine fields left over from the Falklands War begins. Argentina creates a diplomatic incident over the presence of Falkland Islands Government representatives at a conference on sustainable fishing in Spain. After years of delay, the Argentine memorial at the Darwin cemetery was finally inaugurated. Argentina submitted a claim for large areas of the South Atlantic, including the Falkland Islands, under the 1982 Law of the Sea Convention. In the general election, the entire legislative assembly was replaced by new members.
- 2010: Oil exploration around the Falkland Islands begins.
- 2011: A referendum on changing the electoral system in the Falkland Islands was held. A proposal for a single constituency was rejected.
- 2012: In freezing temperatures and a snowstorm, Falkland islanders turned out to give thanks for their liberation from Argentine occupation in 1982. The Argentine president Cristina Kirchner ratcheted up tension with the UK.
- 2013: A referendum is organised by the Falkland Islands Government on the political status of the Falkland Islands. The result was overwhelming support for retention of the link with the UK.
- 2014: The Falkland Islands fields a squad of 25 athletes at the Commonwealth Games, its largest ever attendance at the event. On the centenary anniversary of the Battle of the Falkland Islands, a search begins for the wrecks of the German ships sunk in the Battle of the Falkland Islands. In an act of reconciliation, descendants of Vice Admiral Graf Max von Spee, Vice-Admiral Doveton Sturdee and Rear-Admiral Sir Christopher Cradock attend a remembrance service in Stanley.
- 2015: The 250th anniversary of the first British settlement is celebrated in the islands.
- 2016: An agreement is reached between the UK, Argentina and the Falkland Islands Government with the support of the International Red Cross for a project to identify the remains of Argentine soldiers buried in the Argentine Cemetery in the Falkland Islands.
- 2017: The ICRC anthropology team begins the project to identify fallen Argentine soldiers buried in the Argentine Military Cemetery. As of 2020 the remains of some 115 soldiers have been identified leaving only 10 still to be named.
- 2018: The Falkland Islands Government publishes its plan for improving the health and wealth of Falkland Islanders. Following on from the identification of 90 fallen Argentine soldiers by the ICRC team some 200 relatives are able to visit the graves of their loved ones for the first time.
- 2019: An expedition led by Falkland Islander Mensun Bound, discovers the wreck of the SMS Scharnhorst to the North of the Falkland Islands.
- 2020: COVID-19 pandemic in the Falkland Islands, flights to South America are suspended. Land mine clearance of mines laid in the Falklands War was completed.
- 2022: Flights to South America recommence following the easing of COVID-19 restrictions. Commemorative services are conducted on the 40th anniversary of the Falklands War. Stanley is granted city status during celebrations for Queen Elizabeth II's Platinum Jubilee.

== See also ==
- History of the Falkland Islands
- Origins of Falkland Islanders
- Puerto Soledad
- History of South Georgia and the South Sandwich Islands
- Falklands War
