= 2023 in South America =

The following lists events that happened during 2023 in South America.

== Incumbents ==
=== Argentina ===
(Argentina)

- President: Alberto Fernández (until 10 December), Javier Milei (from 10 December)
- Vice President: Cristina Fernández de Kirchner (until 10 December), Victoria Villarruel (from 10 December)

Argentina claims sovereignty over part of Antarctica, the Islas Malvinas, and South Georgia and the South Sandwich Islands.

=== Bolivia ===
(Bolivia)

- President: Luis Arce (2020–2025)
- Vice President: David Choquehuanca (2020–2025)

=== Brazil ===
(Brazil)

- President: Luiz Inácio Lula da Silva (2023 – present)
- Vice President: Geraldo Alckmin (2023 – present)

=== Chile ===
(Chile)

- President: Gabriel Boric (since 2022)
- President of the Senate: Álvaro Elizalde (since 2022)
- President of the Chamber of Deputies: Raúl Soto (since 2022)

Chile includes the Juan Fernández Islands and Easter Island in the Pacific Ocean. It also claims Chilean Antarctic Territory.

==== Easter Island ====
Alcalde: Pedro Edmunds Paoa

==== Juan Fernández Islands ====
Alcalde: Felipe Paredes Vergara

=== Colombia ===
(Colombia)

- President: Gustavo Petro (2022–present)
- Vice President: Francia Márquez (2022–present)

=== Ecuador ===
(Ecuador)

- President: Guillermo Lasso (2021–2023)
- Vice President: Alfredo Borrero (2021–2023)

=== Guyana ===
(Guyana)

- President: Irfaan Ali (since 2020)
- Prime Minister: Mark Phillips (since 2020)

The Essequibo territory is administered by Guyana but claimed by Venezuela. Tigri Area is disputed with Suriname.

=== Paraguay ===
(Paraguay)

- President: Mario Abdo Benítez (2018–2023); Santiago Pena (2023–present)
- Vice President: Hugo Velázquez Moreno (2018–2023); Pedro Alliana (2023–present)

=== Peru ===
(Peru)

- President: Dina Boluarte (2022–2025)
- Prime Minister: Alberto Otárola (2022–2024)

=== Suriname ===
(Suriname)

- President: Chan Santokhi (2020–2025)
- Vice President: Ronnie Brunswijk (2020–2025)

Tigri Area is disputed with Guyana.

=== Uruguay ===
(Uruguay)

- President: Luis Lacalle Pou (2020–2025)
- Vice President: Beatriz Argimón (2020–2025)

=== Venezuela ===
(Venezuela)

- President: Nicolás Maduro (2013–present)
- Vice President: Delcy Rodríguez (2018–present)

Venezuela claims Guayana Esequiba as part of its territory.

=== British Overseas Territories ===
(United Kingdom)

- Monarch: Charles III (since 2022)

==== Falkland Islands ====
(Falkland Islands)

- Governor: Alison Blake (since 2022)

The Falkland Islands are also claimed by Argentina, which calls them Islas Malvinas (Malvinas Islands).

==== South Georgia and the South Sandwich Islands ====
- Commissioner: Alison Blake (since 2022)

=== French Guiana ===
(France)

- President: Emmanuel Macron (since 2017)
- Prime Minister: Élisabeth Borne (since 2022)
- Prefect: Thierry Queffelec

== Events ==
- January - Luiz Inácio Lula da Silva becomes the president of Brazil and a few days after this, there are many anti-Luiz protests. Luiz vows to punish the protesters
- 5 February — 2023 Ecuadorian constitutional referendum
- 23 April – 2023 Paraguayan general election
- 1 May - Avianca Airways Cesna crashes in some forest in Colombia. The pilot and another passenger are killed. A mother and her children survive but the mother dies later. The children are found in the jungle many days later. This is known as the 2023 Colombia Cessna 206 crash.
- 14 October – An annular solar eclipse will be visible in the Western U.S., Mexico, Central America, Colombia, and Brazil and will be the 44th solar eclipse of Solar Saros 134.
- 29 October – 2023 Argentine general election

== See also ==
- 2020s
- 2020s in political history
- List of state leaders in South America in 2023
- Mercosur
- Organization of American States
- Organization of Ibero-American States
- Caribbean Community
- Union of South American Nations
