= Durham University Business School =

Business school of Durham University

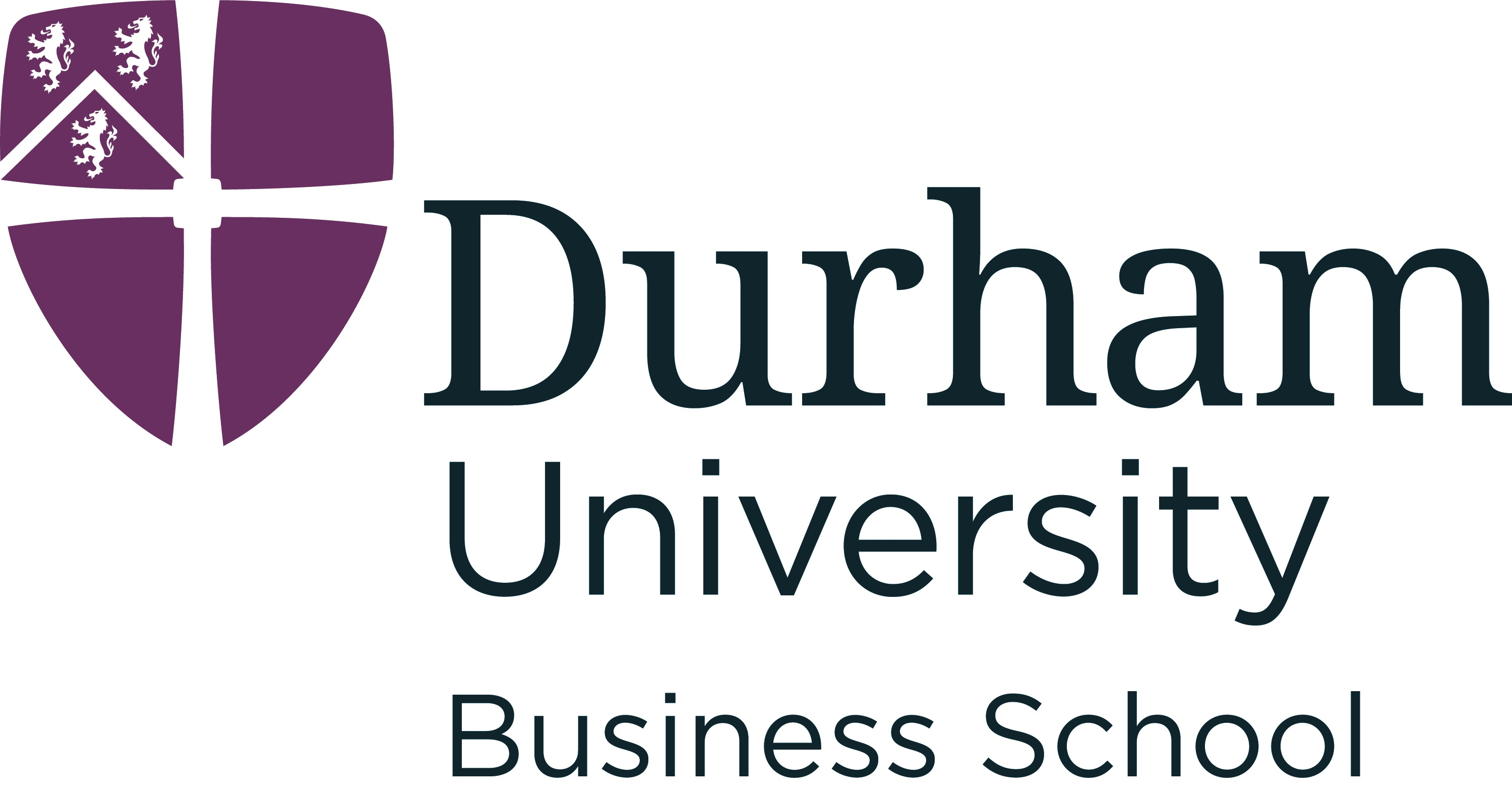
- Type: Public research business school
- Established: 1960 (Business Research Unit); 1965 (First teaching as Durham University Business School); 1968 (Department); 2019 (Faculty)
- Parent institution: Durham University
- Accreditation: Triple accreditation: AACSB; AMBA; EQUIS
- Dean: Kieran Fernandes
- Academic staff: 105: 98% PhD.; 37% female; 78% international
- Students: 4,470
- Undergraduates: 2,900 (2023)
- Postgraduates: 1,300 (2023)
- Doctoral students: 270 (2023)
- Location: Durham, England; 54°45′51″N 1°35′10″W
- Admission rate: 30.5% (2018/19)
- Website: http://www.durham.ac.uk/business/

Durham University Business School (DUBS) is the business school of Durham University, a collegiate public research university in Durham, England. The school holds triple accreditation from AACSB, AMBA and EQUIS. Following a 1963 report on management education by Lord Franks, the school began teaching in 1965, making it one of the oldest business schools in the UK alongside Alliance Manchester Business School. The school contains the departments of accounting, economics, finance, and management and marketing, as well as twelve research centres.

== History ==
Business teaching at Durham University dates back to 1913, when a faculty of commerce was established at Armstrong College in the Newcastle division of the then-federal university. In 1963 this, along with the rest of the Newcastle division, became part of the newly constituted Newcastle University, leaving Durham without a business school. However, Durham University had established the Business Research Unit (BRU) in Durham in 1960 under the auspices of the Department of Economics and in collaboration with the Department of Psychology to carry out business and management-related research, under the direction of Alan Odber.

In 1963, the Franks Report recommended the establishment of two major business schools in London and Manchester (which became the London Business School and the Alliance Manchester Business School) and, crucially for Durham, minor business schools elsewhere in the country as warranted by demand. Charles Baker, a lecturer in the Department of Psychology at Durham since 1961 and a member of the BRU, used this to argue for the establishment of a business school. He was able to obtain funding from the Foundation for Management Education (FME) for two lectureships within the BRU in order to offer post-experience courses to managers. A precursor to these courses was the Advanced Management Program run in 1964 at Bede College, Durham by lecturers from Harvard Business School, before the first courses offered by the BRU, under the name of Durham University Business School, were launched at Easter 1965, also at Bede College. The founding staff in the business school were Odber and Baker along with the two lecturers funded by the FME, John Constable and John Machin, both of whom were recruited from industry. The first head of the business school, as head of the BRU in 1965, was Odber. He left for industry at the end of 1965 and was succeeded by Baker, who remained in post until 1984.

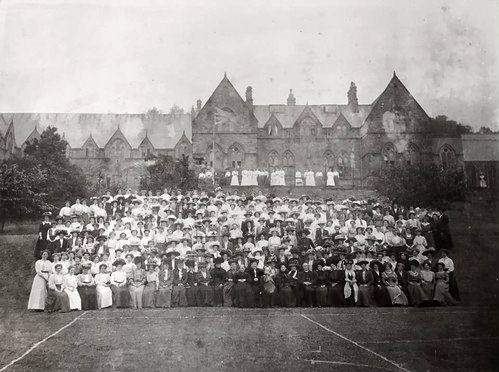
College of the Venerable Bede, Durham offered the first management program at the university in 1964, in connection with Harvard Business School

In December 1966, the BRU formally changed its name to "the Business School". The connection to Harvard continued, with both Constable and Machin spending a year on the international teachers programme there studying their MBA course prior to the launch of Durham's MSc in Management Services (now the MBA) in 1967. Shortly after this the business school, which had operated as part of the department of economics, became a department in its own right in October 1968, with members of the school continuing to participate in undergraduate teaching on business topics in the departments of economics and engineering science. In 1970 the business school appointed the first specialised lecturer in small businesses in the UK. Durham was now well established as a business school, and when the Conference of University Management Schools (now the Chartered Association of Business Schools) was formed in 1971, Durham was one of the twelve founder members.

Baker became the first Professor in Management at Durham in 1975. In 1977, the business school moved from Old Elvet to Mill Hill, with money raised from industry being used to construct a purpose-built residential business school. The 1980s saw the MSc become the MBA (1986), and the launch of the distance-learning MBA (by 1989).

In the early 1980s, the school was one of four in the country (along with London, Manchester and the Scottish Business School in Glasgow) chosen to deliver the Manpower Services Commission's New Enterprise Programme, training people in how to start their own business.

In 1994, the school's MBA programmes were accredited by the Association of MBAs (AMBA). This was followed by EFMD Quality Improvement System (EQUIS) accreditation in 2005 and Association to Advance Collegiate Schools of Business (AACSB) accreditation in 2009.

In January 2002, the department of economics was merged into the business school and Professor Tony Antoniou, previously chair of the department of economics, was appointed as the sixth dean of the school. He resigned as dean in September 2007 and was suspended as a professor of finance in October 2007 after allegations of plagiarism were upheld by a university panel. In March 2008, Antoniou was dismissed by the university for misconduct; the University of York also withdrew his DPhil after carrying out its own plagiarism enquiry.

The school launched a part-time Doctor of Business Administration (DBA) degree in 2002 as a post-experience professional doctorate. In 2006 it formed a partnership to deliver the DBA at Fudan University in China, with the first students starting in 2007. As of 2023, Fudan remains the main location, but some elements of the course are also delivered at Durham and in San Francisco, USA.

Also in 2007, the school formed a partnership with the EBS University of Business and Law in Germany to deliver its Executive MBA course, after a previous partnership with Provadis in Germany ended. The Executive MBA is a dual award made by both universities. A further DBA partnership was established in 2018 with Emlyon Business School in France, launching the Global DBA: Durham–emlyon as a part-time executive doctoral programme.

In 2019, Durham University Business School became the fourth faculty of the university. In 2022, the Waterside Building, on the River Wear north of the city centre, which had been developed as a new headquarters for Durham County Council, was sold to Durham University as a new site for the business school.

In 2025, the school announced a partnership with POLIMI Graduate School of Management in Italy to deliver a joint executive MBA with a focus on responsible leadership and sustainability.

== Facilities ==
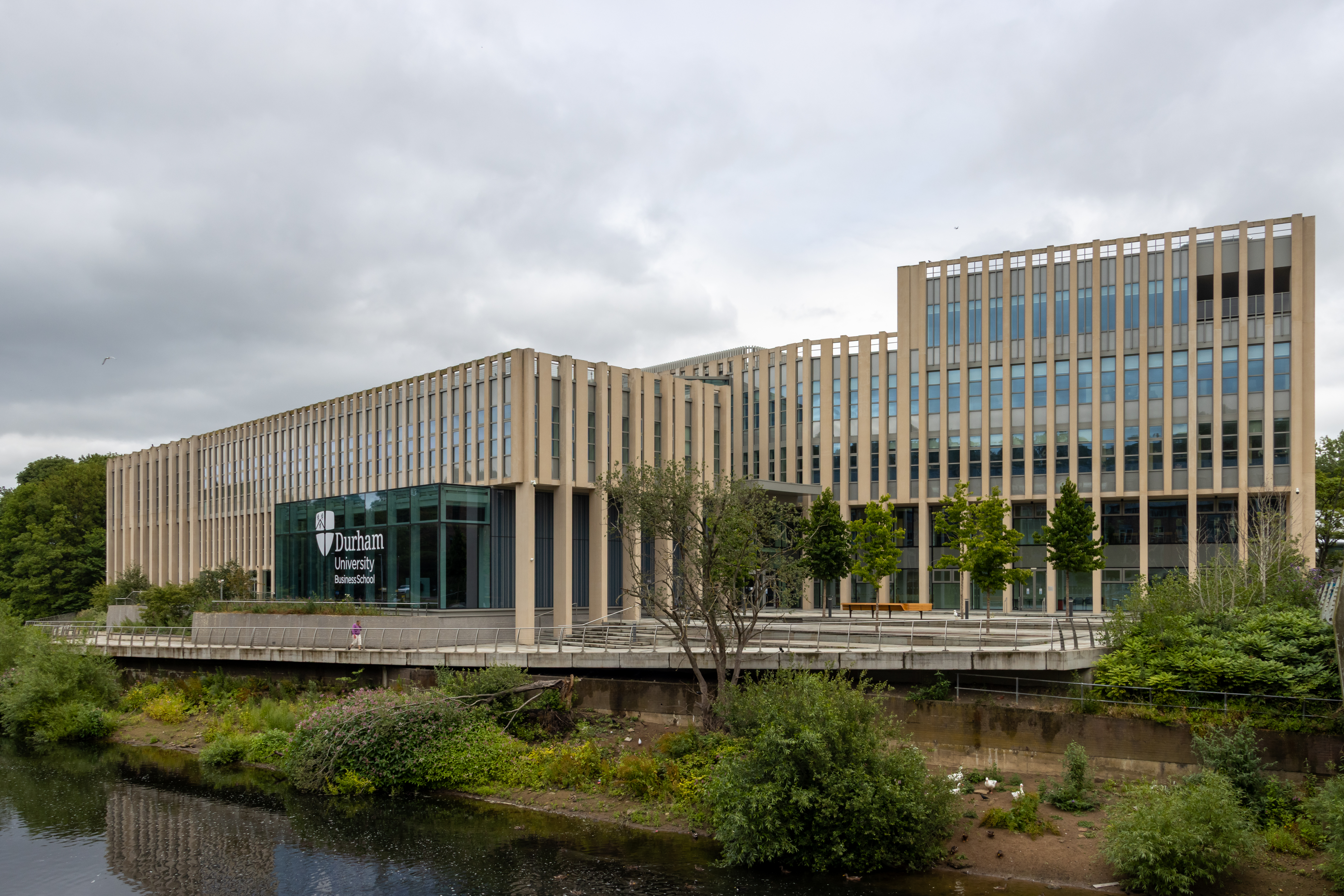
The Waterside Building, home of the department of management and marketing

Durham University Business School is located on two sites in Durham city. The Waterside Building, north of the city centre, is home to the department of management and marketing, including the MBA, DBA and executive education courses. The Mill Hill Lane site, in the Elvet Hill area south of the city centre, contains the departments of accounting, economics and finance.

The Waterside Building falls within the Durham Innovation District, announced in 2023 as a partnership between Durham County Council and Durham University, also taking in the Durham City Incubator, Atom Bank and the Aykley Heads Business Park, as well as Durham railway station on the East Coast Main Line. The building contains an executive education hub, a café and other facilities including a 300-seat lecture theatre and a 74-seat "Harvard style" lecture theatre.

The Mill Hill Lane building was built in the 1970s and extensively renovated in 2013. Facilities include a 260-seat lecture theatre and a 180-seat "Harvard style" lecture theatre, along with a restaurant and library spaces.

Both sites have study spaces, and the Durham University Library study hub at Mill Hill Lane also holds a reference collection of core texts.

== Academic profile ==
=== Teaching ===
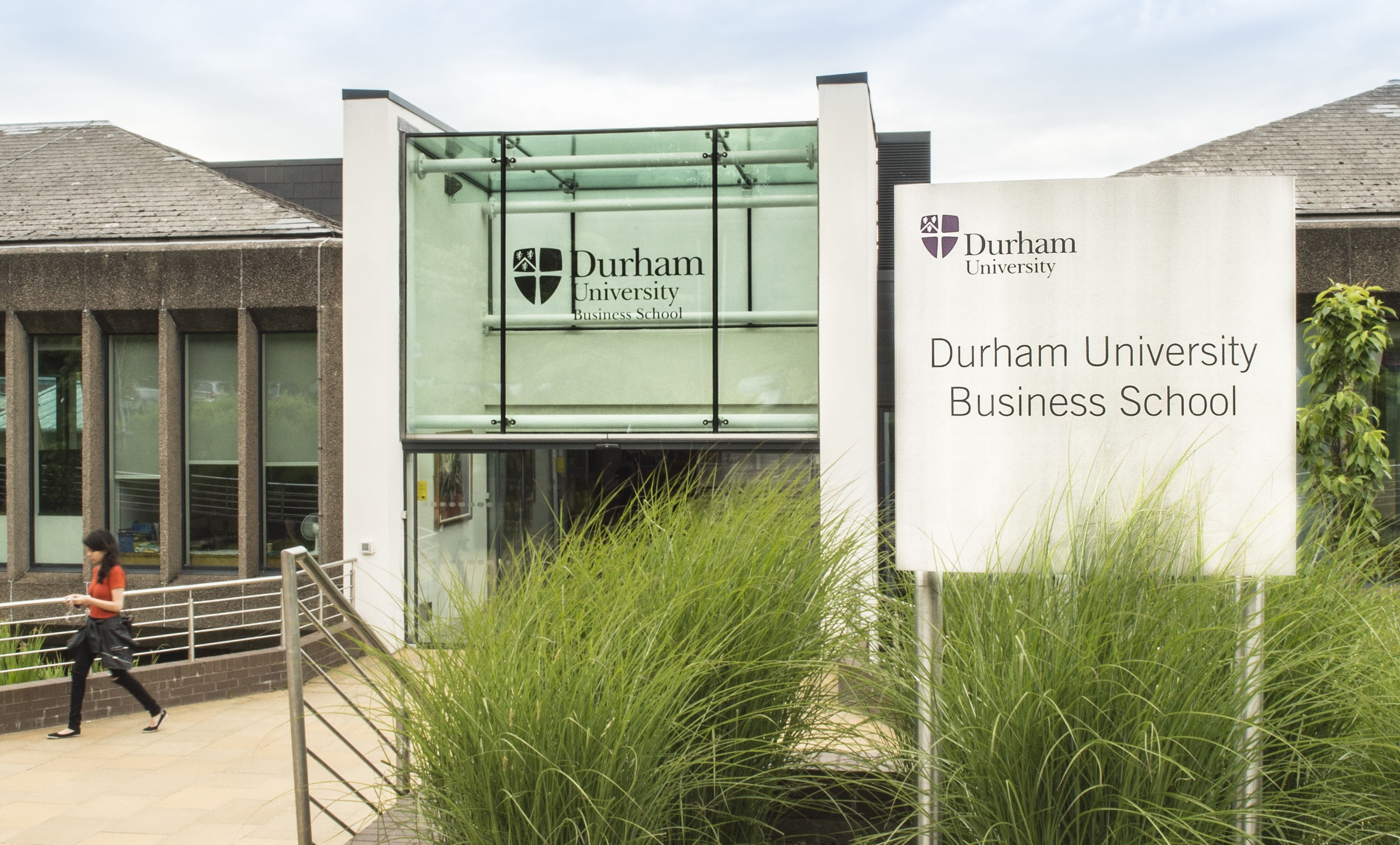
The main building of Durham University Business School on Mill Hill Lane

Durham University Business School provides courses at undergraduate and postgraduate levels. Undergraduate courses include bachelor's degrees in the fields of economics, finance, business, marketing and accounting. Postgraduate degrees are offered in management, marketing, finance and economics, including MBA, MA, MSc, DBA and PhD. Courses are offered in full-time, part-time and distance learning formats.

The school has pioneered the use of a virtual campus on the technology platform Gather Town to improve networking for students on the online MBA course.

=== Research ===
In the 2021 Research Excellence Framework, Durham was ranked 21st of 108 institutions on grade point average (GPA) for business and management studies, with a GPA of 3.32 (compared to an average across the unit of assessment of 3.12). In terms of research power, it was ranked 14th. It was also 14th in terms of number of research-active staff, with 123 full-time equivalent academics entered.

The school has twelve research centres:

- Centre for Banking Institutions and Development
- Centre for Environment and Energy Economics
- Centre for Experimental Methods and Behavioural Research
- Centre of Innovation and Technology Management
- Centre for Leadership and Followership
- Centre for Macroeconomic Policy
- Centre for Organisations and Society
- Durham Research in Economic Analysis and Mechanisms
- El Shaarani Centre for Ethical Finance, Accountability and Governance
- International Centre of Public Accountability
- Marketing and International Business
- Quantitative Research in Financial Economics

The Durham Research in Economic Analysis and Mechanisms research centre has a microeconomics research and skills development partnership with the research and evaluation division of the Competition and Markets Authority, the Microeconomics Unit, based at the UK Government's Darlington Economic Campus.

=== Accreditation ===
The university holds full UK degree-awarding powers which are regulated by the UK's Office for Students. Additional recognition for courses in the business school is provided by accreditation with several organisations at the national and international level, including the Association to Advance Collegiate Schools of Business of the United States – AACSB, the European Quality Improvement System in Europe – EQUIS, and the Association of Masters of Business Administration of the United Kingdom – AMBA.

=== Reputation and rankings ===
Business school rankings

Europe
- QS MBA: 33
- Financial Times MBA: 28

Global
- QS MBA: 90
- Financial Times MBA: 86

In 2024, the Financial Times ranked the MBA 78th in the world, the MSc in management 95th in the world, and the online MBA 6th in the world. They also ranked the pre-experience Masters in Finance 53rd in the world in 2023. The Financial Times European Business School rankings 2024 placed the school 58th in Europe across its range of programmes, with the MBA ranked 27th in Europe and the Master's in Management ranked 74th in Europe.

The Economist ranked the MBA 37th overall (2nd in the UK) in 2021 in a global list of schools which excluded six of the nine UK schools ranked by the Financial Times. The Economist also ranked Durham University's Master's in Management 27th in the world in 2017.

Expansión– Mexico's leading business magazine – ranked the full-time MBA 63rd internationally in 2018 and the Executive MBA 48th in 2017.

== Notable alumni ==
The school has around 25,000 alumni from over 150 countries worldwide. The following individuals are alumni (listed by first name order and qualifications with year of graduation if known)

- Andrew Thorburn, MBA, CEO of the National Australia Bank and former CEO of Bank of New Zealand
- Anwar Choudhury, MBA, British High Commissioner to Bangladesh
- Barry Rowland, MBA (1997), Chief Executive of the Falkland Islands
- James Averdieck, BA in economics (1988), founder and former managing director of Gü
- John Vane, 11th Baron Barnard, MSc (1987), British peer and landowner
- Kerryann Ifill, MBA, president of the Senate, Barbados
- Nigel Phillips, MBA (1997) Governor of the Falkland Islands
- Norman Lacy, MSc, Minister for Educational Services and Minister for the Arts, Government of Victoria, Australia
- Paul Madden, MBA (2002), British High Commissioner to Australia
- Phyllis Kandie, MBA, Kenyan ambassador to Belgium and the European Union; former advisor to the President of Kenya
- Steven Marshall, MBA, Premier of South Australia
- Will Greenwood, BA in economics (1994), English rugby union player in the 1990s and 2000s

=== Honorary doctorates ===
- Joseph Stiglitz DCL – recipient of the Nobel Memorial Prize in Economic Sciences (2001) and the John Bates Clark Medal (1979) – honorary doctor of Durham University Business School

== See also ==
- List of Business Schools in Europe
- Triple Accreditation of Business Schools
