= Glen Ross =

Glen Ross or Glenn Ross may refer to:

== Places ==
- Glen Ross, Ontario, a community in Quinte West

== People ==
- Glenn Ross, a Northern Ireland strongman and powerlifter
- Glenn Ross (politician), an engineer and politician from the Falkland Islands

== Arts ==
- Glengarry Glen Ross, a 1984 play by David Mamet
- Glengarry Glen Ross (film), a 1992 film adapted from the play
