= Tim Thorogood =

British diplomat (born 1962)

Chief Executive of the Falkland Islands
- In office 3 January 2008 – 1 February 2012
- Monarch: Elizabeth II
- Governor: Alan Huckle; Ric Nye (Acting); Nigel Haywood
- Preceded by: Michael Blanch (interim)
- Succeeded by: Keith Padgett

Personal details
- Born: 15 May 1962 (age 64) Barbados
- Party: Independent
- Spouse: Alison Jane Thorogood
- Education: University of Cambridge; Open University

Timothy "Tim" Rupert Thorogood (born 15 May 1962) is an English administrator who served as Chief Executive of the Falkland Islands from 2008 until 2012.

Thorogood was born in Barbados and spent time as a child in the Falklands, where his father worked for Cable & Wireless. He attended Wells Cathedral School and Yeovil College in Somerset, before going on to study at Peterhouse, Cambridge, where in 1983 he graduated with a degree in History. He then went on to receive an MA in Education and an MBA and PhD in Management from the Open University.

After University, Thorogood worked at a school in Gosport, Hampshire, becoming the head of the school's history department. He then moved into local government working in Hertfordshire's LEA and the London Borough of Hillingdon, before becoming Director of Strategic Services in Three Rivers District Council and later Director of Support Services in Haringey Council. In March 2003 he was appointed chief executive of the City and County of Swansea Council. Following his resignation from Swansea Council, Thorogood became the head of the Local Government Information Unit.,.

In August 2007, the Legislative Assembly of the Falkland Islands selected Thorogood to be the British Overseas Territory's new chief executive. He took up the position on 3 January 2008. During his time as chief executive, the Falkland Islands Government increased investment in the search for hydrocarbons in the waters surrounding the islands. In 2011, Thorogood announced that he would be leaving the Falklands for family reasons. He left office in 2012 and was replaced by the Director of Finance, Keith Padgett.

Political offices
Preceded by Michael Blanch; Interim	Chief Executive of the Falkland Islands; 2008–2012	Succeeded by Keith Padgett
