= Penguin News =

Newspaper in the Falkland Islands

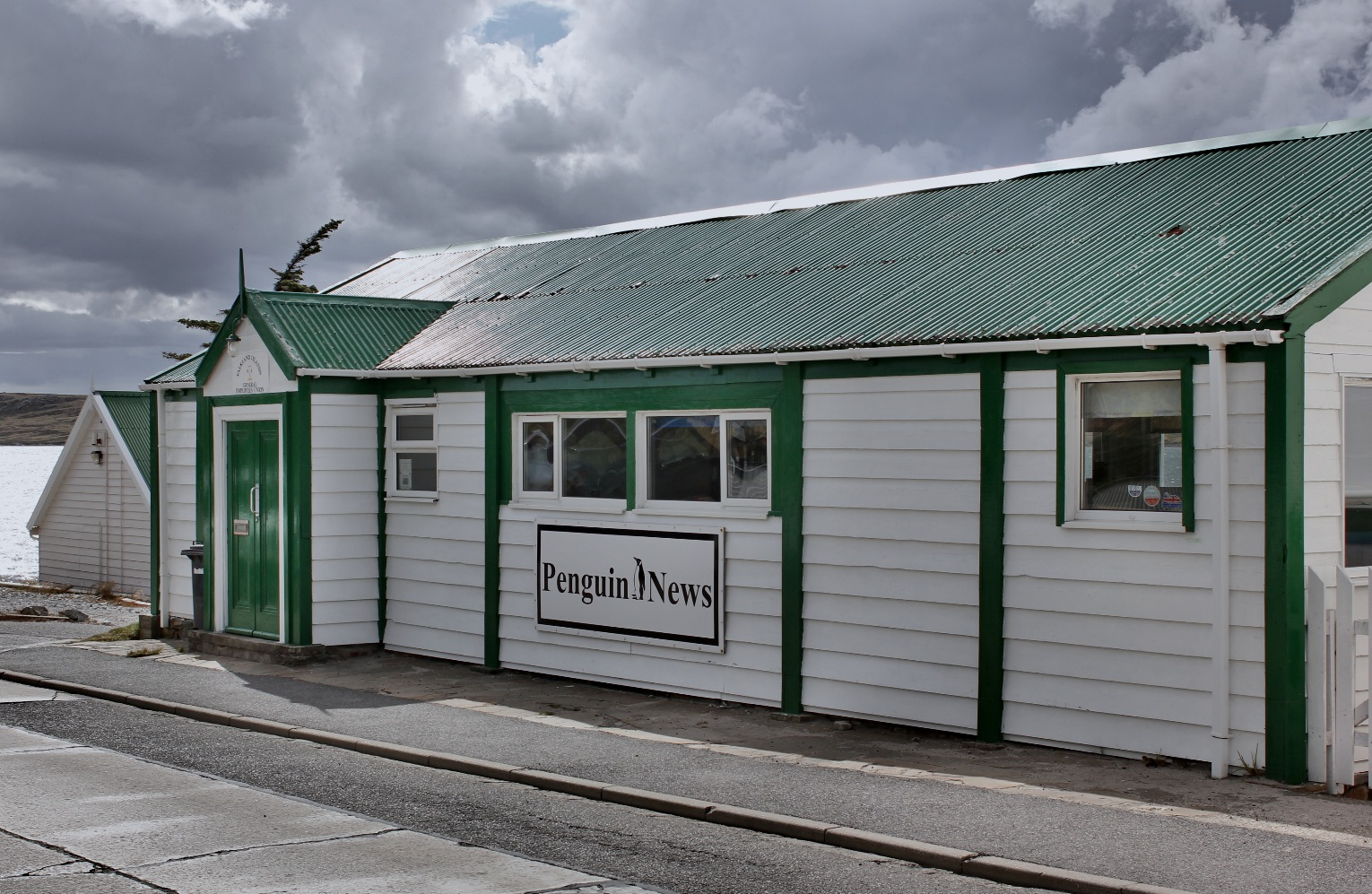
- The Penguin News office on Ross Road, Stanley
- Type: Weekly newspaper
- Owner: Falkland Islands Media Trust
- Founder: Graham Bound
- Managing editor: Lisa Watson
- Founded: 1979
- Language: English
- Website: penguin-news.com

Penguin News is the only newspaper produced in the Falkland Islands. It is published every Friday and provides news and features about the islands.

== History ==
The paper was founded in 1979 by the then editor Graham Bound, and published monthly (or as near monthly as possible) by him. Bound still contributes occasional articles in the paper's fifth decade.

Publication ceased during the Falklands War of 1982, but resumed in June of that year with the iconic "Victory, Freedom and a Future" issue. It became a fortnightly paper and then eventually weekly.

Penguin News was sold to fishing company Seamount Ltd in 1988 on the understanding that the company would provide the investment needed to sustain and develop it. Seamount's directors had experience in the publishing industry, so this was not an unreasonable plan. But Seamount's fishing operation failed and its bankruptcy threatened to take Penguin News with it. The Falkland Islands Government took control of Seamount's assets, and legislation was passed for the Media Trust to guarantee the independence of the paper.

Today, with a staff of four led by editor Lisa Watson, the paper is financially sound and maintains an important place as one of the main sources of news and opinion in the Falklands.

Penguin News is published online behind a paywall through the paper's website. The online version is usually published on Thursday evenings (Falklands time).

The newspaper made headlines internationally in 2012 when it appeared to call the Argentine President, Cristina Fernández de Kirchner, a "bitch"; Penguin News's online site had an image of Kirchner with a default file name as "bitch.jpg".

Editions from 1979 to date are published online by the Falklands Government Archives.

Uruguayan news agency MercoPress marked the 25th anniversary of the founding of Penguin News with an article that tracked the paper's history.

== See also ==
- Falkland Islands Gazette – the official journal of the Falkland Islands Government since 1891
- The Falkland Islands Journal – an annual academic journal, established in 1967, covering all aspects of research on the Falkland Islands
- Falkland Islands Magazine – published monthly from 1889 until 1933
