= Nigel Haywood =

British diplomat (born 1955)

His Excellency Nigel Haywood CVO
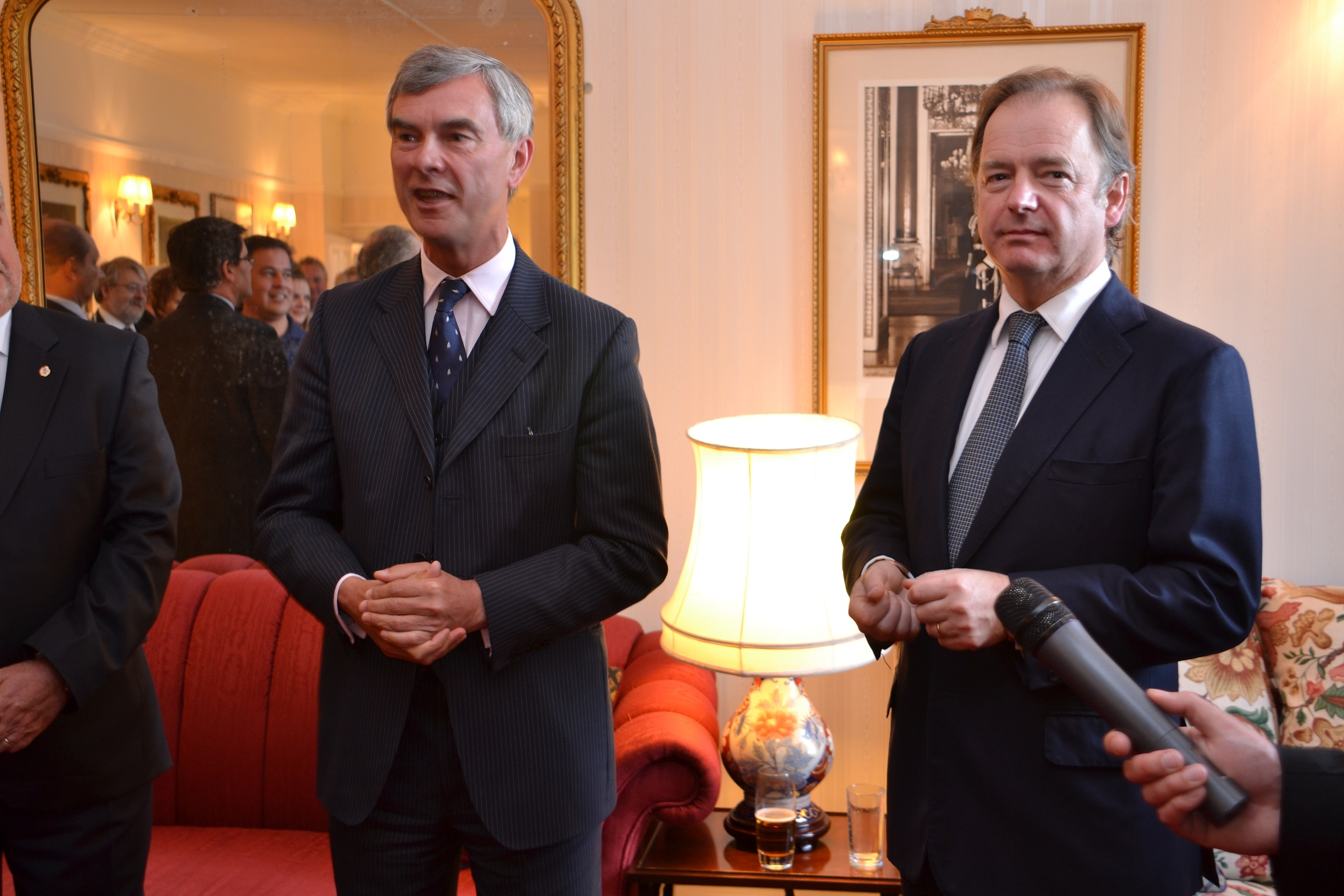
- Nigel Haywood (left) during Foreign Office minister Hugo Swire's (right) visit to the Falkland Islands in February 2014.

Governor of the Falkland Islands Commissioner for South Georgia and the South Sandwich Islands
- In office 16 October 2010 – 29 April 2014
- Monarch: Elizabeth II
- Chief Executive: Tim Thorogood; Keith Padgett
- Preceded by: Alan Huckle
- Succeeded by: Colin Roberts

Personal details
- Born: 17 March 1955 (age 71) Betchworth, United Kingdom
- Spouse: Mary Louise
- Children: 3 sons
- Education: New College, Oxford; Royal Military Academy Sandhurst
- Website: Official website

Nigel Robert Haywood CVO (born 17 March 1955) is a British diplomat, who served as British ambassador to Estonia from 2003 until 2008 and Governor of the Falkland Islands from 2010 until 2014.

== Early life ==
Haywood was born in Betchworth, Surrey, but moved to his mother's native Cornwall when he was nine, following the death of his father.

Educated at Truro School, Haywood studied English at New College, Oxford and then attended the Royal Military Academy Sandhurst before going back to Oxford to study linguistics, eventually becoming a Member of the Chartered Institute of Linguists.

Haywood, a Cornish language speaker, was appointed Bard of the Gorsedh Kernow in 1976, by the Bardic name of Morer (Sea Eagle).

== Diplomatic career ==
After leaving Sandhurst, Haywood was a Lieutenant in the Royal Army Educational Corps before joining Her Majesty's Diplomatic Service in 1983. He first worked in the Foreign and Commonwealth Office with postings in the Republic of Ireland, Hungary, Israel, and Lebanon. In 1992 he became the Deputy Consul-General in Johannesburg and in 1996 he was appointed Deputy Head of the UK's Delegation to the Organization for Security and Co-operation in Europe in Vienna.

From 2003 to 2008, Haywood was the Ambassador from the United Kingdom to Estonia, during which time he and his wife featured in the BBC series Monarchy: The Royal Family at Work which documented Queen Elizabeth II's 2006 visit to Tallinn. In October 2006, Haywood was appointed a Commander of the Royal Victorian Order (CVO). After five years as Ambassador, Haywood became the Consul-General in Basra, Iraq. This earned him the Iraq Reconstruction Service Medal.

== Falkland Islands ==
In 2009, it was announced that Haywood had been appointed Governor of the Falkland Islands and Commissioner for South Georgia and the South Sandwich Islands; he took up office on 16 October 2010.

As Governor, Haywood led commemorations for the 30th anniversary of the Falklands War in 2012 and strongly criticised Argentina's sovereignty claim over the Falklands during increased tensions following the 30th anniversary of the war and the decision of the Falkland Islands government to start oil exploration in Falklands territorial waters. Haywood also used his position to praise the influence of the islands' Chilean population and promote links with Chile.

In 2011, the Argentine Defence minister, Arturo Puricelli, stated that the Falkland Islanders were kept as "hostages" on the islands and later suggested that the British military "is the only element that upholds the usurpation of that part of our national territory". This led Haywood to propose a referendum to see whether islanders want to remain British or not "so we can solve the issue once and for all". A referendum was subsequently held in March 2013 in which 99.8% of the islanders voted to remain a British Overseas Territory. Following the vote Haywood said, "Obviously it is a major principle of the United Nations that a people have their right to self-determination, and you don't get a much clearer expression of the people's self-determination than such a large turnout and such a large 'yes' vote."

In late 2012, the Foreign and Commonwealth Office announced that Haywood would be leaving the Falkland Islands in April 2014, to be replaced as Governor and Commissioner by Colin Roberts. From 2015, Haywood undertook a PhD studying the Falklands Fritillary Butterfly which required him to revisit the islands several times.

Diplomatic posts
Preceded by Sarah Squire	Ambassador from the United Kingdom to Estonia; 2003–2008	Succeeded by Peter Carter
Political offices
Preceded by Alan Huckle	Governor of the Falkland Islands; 2010–2014	Succeeded by Colin Roberts
Preceded by Alan Huckle	Commissioner for South Georgia and the South Sandwich Islands; 2010–2014	Succeeded by Colin Roberts
