= Falkland Islands Football League =

Falkland Islands association football league

NF-Board
- Founded: 1916
- NF-Board affiliation: 1998

The Falkland Islands Football League (FIFL) is the governing body of football in the Falkland Islands. The association operates the national team and the Stanley Services League, a domestic indoor football league on the islands. They also sponsor an all-star team from the league, called Stanley F.C., who occasionally play friendly matches against stationed troops on the islands and Royal Navy makeshift teams. Some Football teams playing in the Falkland Islands are CFL Hunters, FIC Rangers, Fortuna Mustangs and JK Marine Redsox.

== History ==
=== Foundation and Stanley FC ===
Football has been reported to have been played on the Falklands since the late 19th century. The FIFL has recorded their first ever game on the islands to be in 1892. There, a team of the Falkland Islands Defence Force took on the garrison. Throughout this time, prior to World War I, the sport was played frequently amongst the residents of the Falklands. There was a 1913 report in the Falkland Islands Magazine of a football league table that consisted of five teams names as Dazzlers, Sappers, Crusaders, Corinthians and Malvinians. There was also reported the construction of a pavilion in Mr Bradfields Yard.

The first ever organized football team in the Falklands was regarded as Stanley F.C., which was formed under the power of Jack McNicholl. No official date of when the club began play, but it was reported to have been in existence since 1916. The Falkland Islands Magazine reported this in its 1916 February issue No. X, Vol. XXVIII. in an article "The Stanley Football Club", and stated the club would "...run two teams, the Colours of the 1st XI. to be Red Jerseys, and the 2nd XI. Green Jerseys: both will play in white shorts...."

During the 1920s and 1930s, most competitive football matches on the Falkland Islands were of military stationed there over the age of 18. During the latter half of the 1930s, many Falkland Islander boys tried to organize a recreation league on the island, though they were never successful. However, the efforts did prompt two youth teams to form in the 1950s, which were named Jubilee Club and the FI Volunteers Youth, whom occasionally played matches with one another.

=== Falkland Islands Premiership ===
A league with 7 teams was formed but the local side was somewhat outclassed by the near professional standard of the Garrison teams and finished 6th. Many of the players who were later to serve the Stanley side for many years earned their baptism against the soldiers who also had their own inter-service competitions. One of the West Yorks who played regularly against the local lads was a young Warrant Officer named Don Clarke, who after the War returned to the Islands and in addition to becoming Chairman of the present Club, also captained the local side from his favoured inside left position.

After the West Yorkshire Regiment was withdrawn and replaced by The Service Corps and Royal Scots detachments a new league was formed with 6 teams – Scots 1 and 11, Corps 1 and 11, the Navy and the Falkland Islands Defence Force. The F.I.D.F. finished as ‘runner-up’ in this League.

=== Creation of a national team ===
Following World War II, the name Stanley F.C. was revived, and became the nickname of the national team.

== Past teams ==
These teams have played friendly matches or in previous FIFL seasons:

- Corps 1
- Corps 11
- Falkland Islands Defense Force F.C.
- Falkland Islands Volunteers F.C.
- HMS Manchester F.C.
- Scotts 1
- Scotts 11
- Stanley F.C.
- Tri Services F.C.
- SeaLed PR
- Kelper Store
- Chandelry FC
- Sulivan Blue Sox
- HMS Montrose
- Suppliers
- Tri Service Allstars
- C&R Construction FC
- Falkland Rangers
- Malvina House Hotel FC
- Jim Balfour's Barmy Army
- Falkland Island Holidays FC
- Fire FC
- Clos de Pirque
- House Bashers
- Teenage Mutant Ninja Škrtels
- Great Island Falcons
- Port Stanley
- The Deli
- Lydiate Pumas

== Previous winners ==
Winners so far:

- 1916: Stanley F.C.
- 1917: Stanley F.C.
- 1918: Stanley F.C.
- 1919: Stanley F.C.
- 1920: Stanley AC
- 1921: Stanley AC
- 1922: FI Volunteers
- 1923: Stanley AC
- 1924: FI Volunteers
- 1925: Stanley AC
- 1926: Stanley AC
- 1927: Stanley AC
- 1928: Stanley AC
- 1929: Stanley AC
- 1930: FI Volunteers
- 1931: Stanley AC
- 1932: FI Volunteers
- 1933: Stanley Service Corps I F.C.
- 1934: FI Volunteers
- 1935: Jubilee Club
- 1936: FI Volunteers
- 1937: FI Volunteers
- 1938: FI Volunteers
- 1939: FIDF
- 1940: FI Volunteers
- 1941: FIDF
- 1942: FIDF
- 1943: Stanley Service Corps I F.C.
- 1944: FIDF
- 1945: FIDF
- 1946: Hotspurs
- 1947: Redsox
- 1947–48: unknown
- 1948–49: Redsox
- 1949–50: Redsox
- 1950–51: Stanley United
- 1951–52: Hotspurs
- 1952–53: Hotspurs
- 1953–54: Hotspurs
- 1954–55: Dynamos
- 1955–56: Redsox
- 1956–57: Redsox
- 1957–58: Hotspurs
- 1958–59: Rangers
- 1959–60: Redsox
- 1960–61: Redsox
- 1961–62: Redsox
- 1962–63: Redsox
- 1963–64: Mustangs
- 1964–65: Mustangs
- 1965–66: Mustangs
- 1966–67: unknown
- 1967–68: unknown
- 1968–69: Rangers
- 1969–70: Mustangs
- 1970–71: Redsox
- 1971–72: Rangers
- 1972–73: unknown
- 1973–74: Mustangs
- 1974–75: unknown
- 1975–76: Rangers
- 1976–77: Rangers
- 1977–78: unknown
- 1978–79: Dynamos
- 1979–80: unknown
- 1980–81: unknown
- 1982–1986: No season due to the Falklands War
- 1986–87: unknown
- 1987–88: Redsox
- 1988–89: unknown
- 1989–90: Redsox
- 1990–91: Celtics
- 1991–92: Mustangs
- 1993–1998: unknown
- 1998–99: Kelper Store Celtics
- 1999–00: Hard Disc Rangers
- 2000–01: Kelper Store Celtics
- 2001–02: Kelper Store Celtics
- 2002–03: Kelper Store Celtics
- 2003–04: All Saints
- 2004–05: Kelper Store Celtics
- 2005–06: Penguin News
- 2006–07: Globe Tavern Wanderers
- 2007–08: Kelper Store Celtics
- 2008–09: Kelper Store Celtics
- 2009–10: SeaLed PR
- 2010–11: Sulivan Bluesox
- 2011–12: Chandlery FC
- 2012–13: Chandlery FC
- 2013–14: not held
- 2014–15: FIDF (7-a-side tournament)
- 2015–2020: unknown
- 2021–22: JK Marine Redsox
- 2022–23: CFL Hunters
- 2023–24: JK Marine Redsox
