= List of ambassadors of the United Kingdom to Estonia =

His Britannic Majesty's Ambassador to the Republic of Estonia
- Royal Arms as used by His Majesty's Government
- Incumbent; Ross Allen since June 2021
- Style: His Excellency
- Appointer: Charles III
- Term length: At His Britannic Majesty's pleasure
- Inaugural holder: Ernest Wilton
- Formation: 1919

The ambassador of the United Kingdom to Estonia is the United Kingdom's foremost diplomatic representative in the Republic of Estonia, and head of the UK's diplomatic mission in Tallinn. The official title is His Britannic Majesty's Ambassador to the Republic of Estonia.

The United Kingdom first recognised Estonian independence during the Russian Civil War, and the two countries exchanged envoys for over twenty years. The United Kingdom refused to recognise the Soviet Union's unilateral annexation of Estonia in 1940, and the de facto non-independence caused the UK to close its mission and sever diplomatic ties with Estonia as a result. In 1991, upon restoration of de facto independence, the United Kingdom reestablished diplomatic links with Estonia, and the two countries resumed their exchange of ambassadors.

== List of heads of mission ==
=== Envoys extraordinary and ministers plenipotentiary ===
From 1921 to 1940, British ministers to Latvia, based in Riga, were also accredited to Estonia and Lithuania.

- 1921–1922: Ernest Wilton
- 1922–1927: Sir Tudor Vaughan
- 1928–1930: Joseph Addison
- 1931–1934: Hughe Knatchbull-Hugessen
- 1934–1937: Sir Edmund Monson, 3rd Baronet
- 1937–1940: Sir Charles Orde
- 1940: Wilfred Hansford Gallienne

No representation 1940–91. Estonia was incorporated into the Soviet Union in 1940, and regained its independence in 1991.

=== Ambassadors ===
- 1991–1994: Brian Low
- 1994–1997: Charles de Chassiron
- 1997–2000: Timothy Craddock
- 2000–2003: Sarah Squire
- 2003–2007: Nigel Haywood
- 2007–2012: Peter Carter
- 2012–2016: Christopher Holtby
- 2016–2021: Theresa Bubbear
- 2021-present: Ross Allen
