= Politics of the Falkland Islands =

The politics of the Falkland Islands takes place in a framework of a constitutional monarchy and parliamentary representative democratic dependency as set out by the constitution, whereby the Governor exercises the duties of head of state in the absence of the monarch, and the Chief Executive is the head of the Civil Service, with an elected Legislative Assembly to propose new laws, national policy, approve finance and hold the executive to account.

The Falkland Islands, an archipelago in the southern Atlantic Ocean, are a self-governing British overseas territory. Executive power is exercised on behalf of the King by an appointed Governor, who primarily acts on the advice of the Executive Council. Legislative power is vested in both the government and the Legislative Assembly. The judiciary is independent of the executive and the legislature. The military defence and foreign policy of the islands is the responsibility of the United Kingdom. No political parties exist on the islands currently and so Members stand as independents, however the governmental and legal proceedings very closely resemble British standards.

Following the Falklands War in 1982, Lord Shackleton published a report on the economy of the Falkland Islands which recommended many modernisations. On 1 January 1983 the Falkland Islanders gained British citizenship under the British Nationality (Falkland Islands) Act 1983, and on 3 October 1985 the Constitution of the Falkland Islands was established. A new constitution came into force on 1 January 2009 which modernised the Chapter on fundamental rights and freedoms of the individual, embedding self-determination in the main body of the constitution. The new constitution also replaced the Legislative Council with the Legislative Assembly, and better explained the role of the Governor and the Chief Executive.

== Sovereignty issues ==
The Argentine Republic claims the Falkland Islands (known in Spanish as Islas Malvinas) to be part of its territory. This claim is disputed by the Falkland Islanders and the United Kingdom. In 1982, Argentina invaded and occupied the islands, starting the Falklands War. The islands were subsequently liberated by British forces just 74 days after the start of the war, which led to the collapse of the military dictatorship in Argentina.

The sovereignty of the Falklands remains in dispute, with Argentina claiming the islands are an integral and indivisible part of its territory, 'illegally occupied by an occupying power'. The United Kingdom and the Government of the Falkland Islands maintains that the Islanders have the right to determine the sovereignty of their birthplace. In a referendum in 2013 the people of the Falkland Islands soundly rejected Argentina's claim to the islands, with 99.8% of voters supporting the Falklands remaining an Overseas Territory of the United Kingdom.

== Executive ==
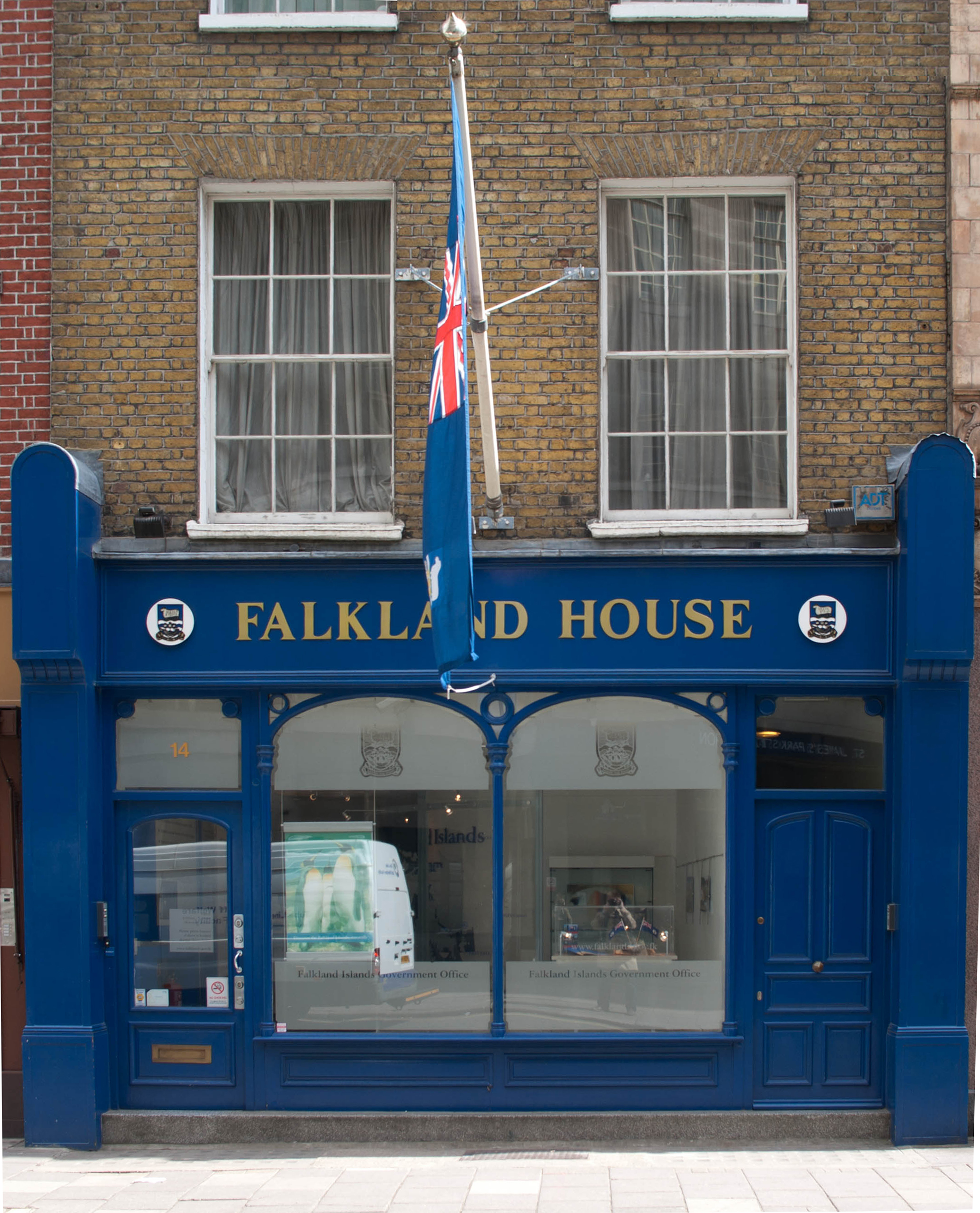
Falkland House, the representative office for the Falkland Islands Government in Westminster, London

Executive authority on the Falkland Islands is vested in Charles III, who has been the head of state since his accession to the British throne on 8 September 2022. As the King is absent from the islands for most of the time, executive authority is exercised "in His Majesty's name and on His Majesty's behalf" by the Governor of the Falkland Islands. Colin Martin-Reynolds has been Governor since 29 July 2025.

The Governor normally acts only on the advice of the Executive Council of the Falkland Islands, which is composed of three Members of the Legislative Assembly elected by the Assembly to serve on the Council every year, the Chief Executive, the Director of Finance and the Governor, who acts as presiding officer. The only members with a vote to progress a change in law or policy are the democratically elected Members of the Legislative Assembly who are serving on Executive Council. The constitution does permit the Governor to act without consulting the Executive Council and even going against its instructions, but in both cases the Governor must immediately inform the Secretary of State for Foreign and Commonwealth Affairs in the United Kingdom, who can overrule the Governor's actions.

Government policy and the execution thereof is primarily decided by the 3 officio Executive Council MLAs. The Chief Executive leads the civil service and undertakes actions from Executive Council.

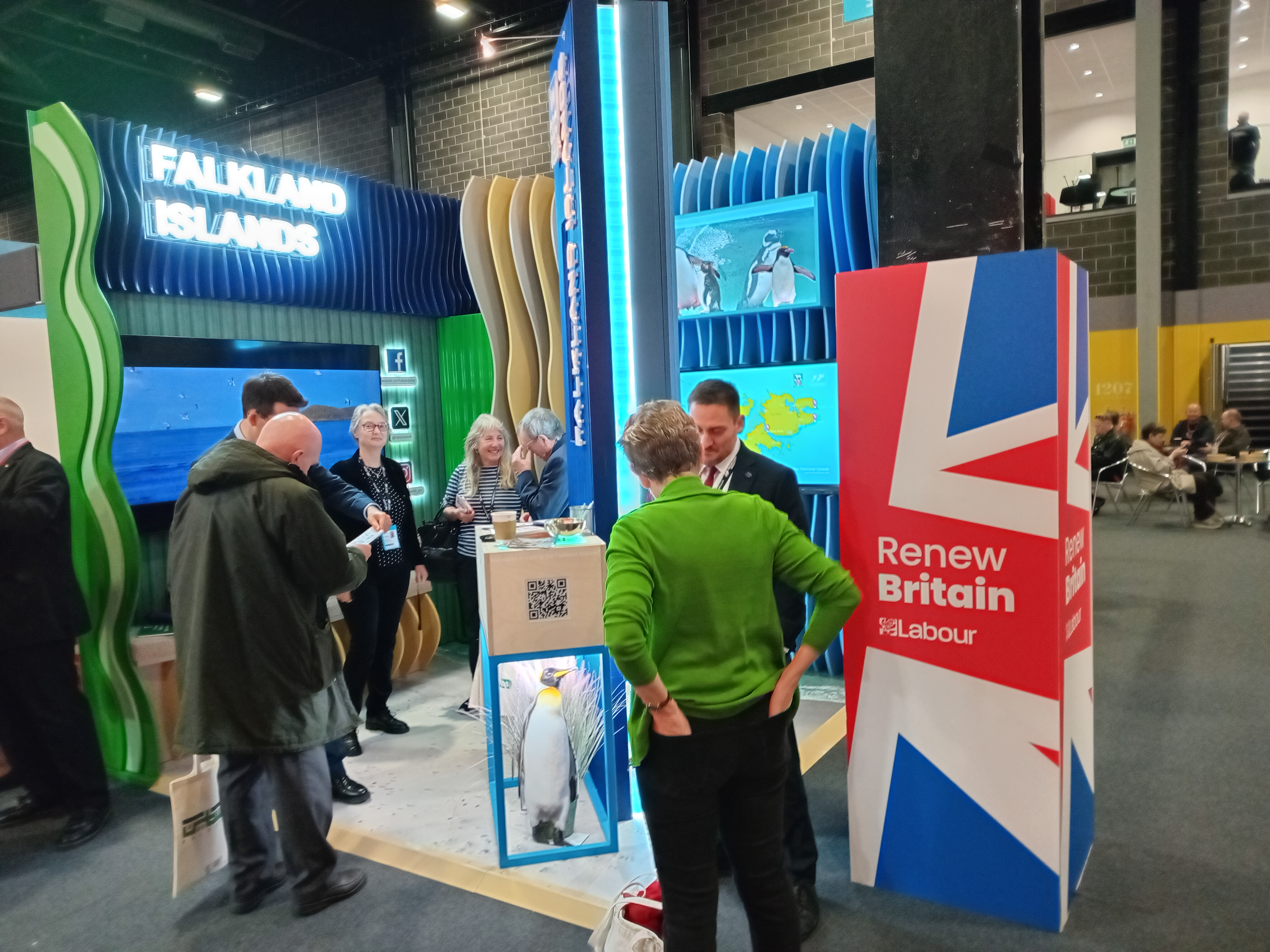
Falkland Islands stall at Labour Party Conference 2025

== Legislature ==
The legislative branch consists of a unicameral Legislative Assembly. General elections must take place at least once every four years, in which the islanders elect eight members to the Legislative Assembly (five from Stanley and three from Camp) through universal suffrage using block voting. There are also two ex officio members of the Assembly (the Chief Executive and the Director of Finance) who take part in proceedings but are not permitted to vote in the Assembly.

The following major conventions apply to the Falkland Islands and should be taken into account during the drafting of legislation:

- European Convention on Human Rights (ECHR)
- International Covenant on Economic, Social and Cultural Rights (ICESCR)
- International Covenant on Civil and Political Rights (ICCPR)
- United Nations Convention Against Torture (UNCAT)
- UN Convention on the Rights of the Child (UNCRC)
- UN Convention on the Elimination of Racial Discrimination (CERD)
- UN Convention on the Elimination of all Forms of Discrimination Against Women (CEDAW).

Until 2009, when the new constitution came into force and created the Legislative Assembly, the legislature of the islands was the Legislative Council, which had existed since the 19th century.

== Judiciary ==
The judicial branch consists of the Supreme Court, the Court of Appeal, the Summary Court and the Magistrates' Court. The judiciary is strictly independent of the executive and legislature, although it has links with the other branches of the government through the Advisory Committee on the Prerogative of Mercy. The government also employs six lawyers (the Attorney General, Law Commissioner, two Crown Counsels and two Legislative Drafters), a Policy Adviser and one Policy Officer.

=== Courts ===
The court system of the Falklands is set out by Chapter VIII of the Constitution and closely resembles the system in England and Wales. The Supreme Court of the Falkland Islands has unlimited jurisdiction to hear and determine any civil or criminal proceedings, and consists of the Chief Justice (CJ) who is generally a senior barrister or solicitor with a good amount of judicial experience in the United Kingdom. The CJ is not resident in the Falkland Islands but travels to the islands if and when necessary to hear cases. The most serious criminal and civil matters are reserved for the Supreme Court. In civil matters, generally there is no jury however, in criminal matters, the defendant can elect trial by judge and jury or judge alone. There are only a few criminal cases which must be heard before the Supreme Court; these are murder, manslaughter, rape, piracy, treason and arson with the intent to endanger life. The CJ also hears appeals from the Magistrates' Court.

From the Supreme Court, appeals are sent to the Falkland Islands Court of Appeal, which is based on the Court of Appeal of England and Wales. The Court of Appeal consists of a President and two Justices of Appeal, as well as the Chief Justice of the Supreme Court who serves as an ex officio member. The President and Justices of Appeal are normally from the UK and are Judges of the Court of Appeal of England and Wales. Appeals from the Court of Appeal are sent to the Judicial Committee of the Privy Council.

The Falkland Islands does not have its own bar or law society, but has a "Falkland Islands Legal Community". There is no differentiation between being a barrister or a solicitor; the private practitioners being called legal practitioners. The Legal Practitioners Ordinance defines who can hold themselves out as being a legal practitioner and therefore have rights of audience before the Falkland Islands courts. Only the Chief Justice of the Falkland Islands can prohibit a legal practitioner from practising.

In the court system on the islands, there is a panel of Justices of the Peace (JPs) who sit in the Summary Court, which has no jury. JPs are all non-lawyers and are made up of "upstanding members of the community". They hear the most simple of criminal cases (or sit when the Senior Magistrate is not in the Islands) and they also act as the Licensing Justices who deal with alcohol-related applications, such as extended opening hours, special occasion licences, etc.

The Senior Magistrate (SM) is appointed by the Governor and presides over the Magistrates' Court, which again has no jury. The SM is usually a UK qualified lawyer, with at least 10 years experience as an advocate and, usually, with some judicial experience. The SM holds office for a maximum of three years and is then replaced. The SM is resident in the Islands and hears the majority of cases from simple criminal and civil matters right up to very serious criminal matters or complex civil cases. The SM also hears appeals from the Summary Court.

==== List of chief justices ====
- 1987–1997: Sir Renn Davis
- 1998–2007: James Wood
- 2007–2015: Christopher Gardner QC
- 2015–2017: Sir Simon Bryan QC
- 2018–present: James Lewis KC

=== Advisory Committee on the Prerogative of Mercy ===
The Governor has the power to grant a pardon to any person concerned in or convicted of an offence, but the Governor can only use this power after consultation with the Advisory Committee on the Prerogative of Mercy. The Committee consist of two elected members of the Legislative Assembly (appointed by the Governor on the advice of the Legislative Assembly), the Chief Executive, the Attorney General and the Chief Medical Officer.

==== Members ====
- Jack Ford — Member of the Legislative Assembly (Camp Constituency)
- Lewis Clifton — Member of the Legislative Assembly (Stanley Constituency)
- Andrea Clausen — Chief Executive
- Simon Young — Attorney General
- Dr Rebecca "Beccy" Edwards — Chief Medical Officer

=== Attorney general ===
The Attorney General (AG), appointed by the Governor, is the main legal adviser to the Falkland Islands Government. The AG's primary role is to determine the legality of government proceedings and action, and has the power to institute and undertake criminal proceedings before any court of law, to take over and continue any criminal proceedings that may have been instituted by another person or authority, or to discontinue at any stage before judgment any criminal proceedings instituted or undertaken by another person or authority. In the exercise of his or her powers, the AG is not subject to the direction or control of any other person or authority.

The Attorney General is also a member of the Advisory Committee on the Prerogative of Mercy and acts as presiding officer during Speaker elections in the Legislative Assembly, and has a constitutional right to attend all meetings of the Assembly and all meetings of the Executive Council.

The current Attorney General is Simon Young, who took office in December 2017.

== Finances ==
The Director of Finance of the Falkland Islands is responsible for government expenditure on the islands, acting with authorisation from the Legislative Assembly. The Director is also an ex officio member of both the Legislative Assembly and the Executive Council.

There is also a Public Accounts Committee consisting of a chairman and two other members appointed by the Governor (in consultation with the elected MLAs) and two elected members of the Legislative Assembly. Reporting to the Legislative Assembly, the Committee overseas the economy, government expenditure, all public accounts and audit reports on the islands. The Director of Finance is not permitted to be a member of the Public Accounts Committee.

== Elections and parties ==
Map of constituencies of the Falkland Islands

As in many parliamentary democracies, there are no direct elections for the executive branch of the Falkland Islands Government. Instead the people elect the legislature which then advises and forms part of the executive. General elections, which elect the Legislative Assembly, must take place at least once every four years. Suffrage is universal in the Falklands, with the minimum voting age at eighteen. The Legislative Assembly has ten members, eight of which are elected using block voting (five from the Stanley constituency and three from the Camp constituency) and two ex officio members (the Chief Executive and the Director of Finance).

In the last general election, which took place on 11 December 2025, only non-partisans were elected as there are no active political parties in the Falkland Islands.

Historically, there have been two political parties in the Falkland Islands:

- Desire the Right Party (active 1987–1996)
- National Progressive Party (active in the 1960s)

== See also ==
- Falkland Islands Gazette – official journal of the Falkland Islands Government

== References and sources ==
Sources

- L.L. Ivanov et al.. The Future of the Falkland Islands and Its People. Sofia: Manfred Wörner Foundation, 2003. Printed in Bulgaria by Double T Publishers. 96 pp. ISBN 954-91503-1-3
