= Falkland Islands Gazette =

Government gazette of the Falkland Islands

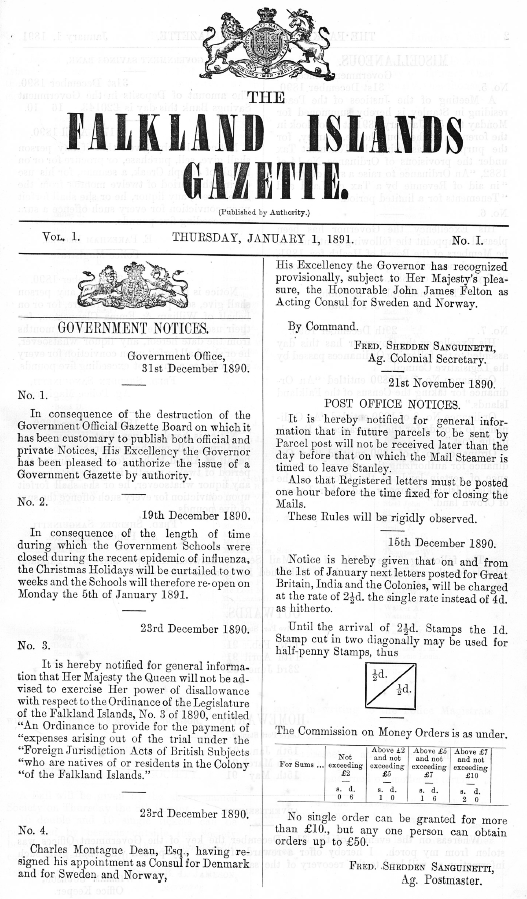
Cover of the first issue, 1 January 1891.

The Falkland Islands Gazette is the government gazette of the Falkland Islands Government. It has been published in Stanley since 1891.

== See also ==
- List of British colonial gazettes
- Penguin News
- Falkland Islands Magazine
