= Colin Martin-Reynolds =

Governor of the Falkland Islands

His Excellency Colin Martin-Reynolds CMG
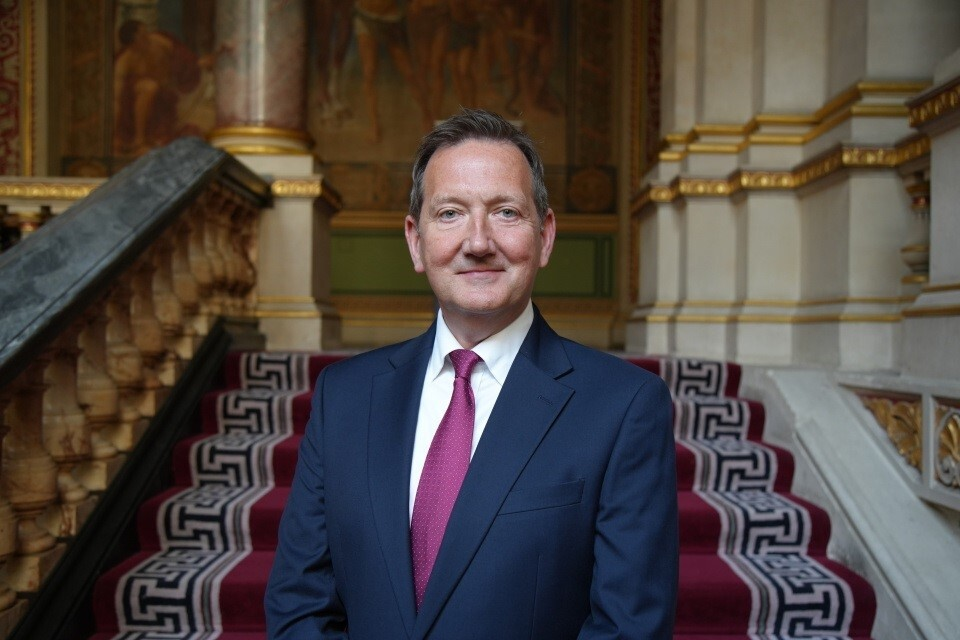

Governor of the Falkland Islands Commissioner for South Georgia and the South Sandwich Islands
- Incumbent
- Assumed office 29 July 2025
- Monarch: Charles III
- Chief Executive: Andrea Clausen
- Preceded by: Alison Blake

British Ambassador to Colombia
- In office September 2019 – July 2022
- Monarch: Elizabeth II
- Prime Minister: Boris Johnson
- Preceded by: Peter Tibber
- Succeeded by: George Hodgson

Personal details
- Spouse: Samuel Martin-Reynolds
- Children: Raphael Martin-Reynolds
- Occupation: Diplomat

Colin Martin-Reynolds, CMG, is a British diplomat who has served as Governor of the Falkland Islands and Commissioner of South Georgia and the South Sandwich Islands since 2025. He previously served as Ambassador to Colombia.

== Career ==
=== Diplomatic career ===
Martin-Reynolds joined the Foreign and Commonwealth Office (FCO) in 1990. His early career took him to Cyprus, Ukraine, and then the United States. From 2011 until 2013 he was deputy head of mission in Brasília, and then in from 2013 until 2018 was the FCO's chief information officer. In 2018 he was selected to be the ambassador to Colombia, and after pre-posting training held that position from 2019 to 2022. After home duties, including a role dealing with the FCO's role in the UK's COVID Inquiry, he was appointed the governor of the Falkland Islands in 2025.

=== Falkland Islands governor ===
Martin-Reynolds took up his appointment as governor in July 2025. The swearing in ceremony was held on 2 August 2025, which was followed by a parade of the Falkland Islands Defence Force in Stanley on Victory Green. In October 2025 Martin-Reynolds paid his first visit to South Georgia. In December 2025 Martin-Reynolds presided over the swearing in of the newly-elected Falkland Islands assembly.

Diplomatic posts
Preceded by Peter Tibber	British Ambassador to Colombia; 2019–2022	Succeeded by George Hodgson
Political offices
Preceded by Alison Blake	Governor of the Falkland Islands; 2025–	Incumbent
Preceded by Alison Blake	Commissioner for South Georgia and the South Sandwich Islands; 2025–	Incumbent
