= Keith Padgett =

Falkland Islands politician

Chief Executive of the Falkland Islands
- In office 1 February 2012^{[a]} – 3 October 2016
- Monarch: Elizabeth II
- Governor: Nigel Haywood; Colin Roberts
- Preceded by: Tim Thorogood
- Succeeded by: Barry Rowland

Director of Finance of the Falkland Islands
- In office 1 July 2008 – 6 March 2012
- Chief Executive: Tim Thorogood
- Preceded by: Derek Howatt
- Succeeded by: Nicola Granger

Personal details
- Party: Nonpartisan
- Spouse: Val
- a. Served as interim Chief Executive until 6 March 2012.

Keith Padgett is an English politician who served as Chief Executive of the Falkland Islands from 2012 to 2016. Before his appointed as Chief Executive, Padgett served as the islands' Financial Secretary from 2008, which was renamed Director of Finance with the implementation of the 2009 Constitution. He also acts as Director of Corporate Resources.

Padgett first came to the Falklands in 2001 to serve as Deputy Financial Secretary under Derek Howatt. He was a candidate for Chief Executive in 2007, losing out to Tim Thorogood. In 2008, he succeeded Howatt as Financial Secretary and in 2012 Padgett became Chief Executive of the Falkland Islands, taking over from Thorogood who resigned for family reasons.

As Chief Executive, Padgett led the Falkland Islands efforts to develop oil exploration in the Falklands Exclusive Economic Zone and assisted the Governor in leading commemorations for the 30th anniversary of the Falklands War in 2012. He presided over the sovereignty referendum in 2013, acting as returning officer, and also served as returning officer at the November 2013 general election.

In early 2016 Padgett announced his intention to retire and was succeeded by Barry Rowland in October 2016.

Political offices
Preceded by Derek Howatt (as Financial Secretary)	Director of Finance of the Falkland Islands; 2008–2012	Succeeded by Nicola Granger
Preceded by Tim Thorogood	Chief Executive of the Falkland Islands; 2012–2016	Succeeded by Barry Rowland
