= Charles de Chassiron (British diplomat) =

British diplomat (1948–2018)

Charles Richard Lucien de Chassiron, CVO (27 April 1948 – 5 April 2018) was a British diplomat. He was educated at Rugby School and Jesus College, Cambridge University, where he studied history. He held a Kennedy Scholarship at Harvard, where he received a Master in Public Administration (MPA) degree.

He joined the Foreign and Commonwealth Office (FCO) in 1971. He was Economic and Commercial Secretary at the British Embassy in Brasilia between 1982 and 1985. Over the course of his FCO career, he was the Head of South America Department (1987–1989), Commercial and Economic Counsellor in Italy (1989–1994), Ambassador to Estonia (1994–1997), Consul-General in Milan (1997–2001) and Director of Protocol and Vice-Marshal of the Diplomatic Corps (2002–2006). He was appointed Commander of the Royal Victorian Order (CVO) on 16 October 2000.

After retirement from the Diplomatic Service he was chairman of Spencer House and Chairman of the British-Italian Society. In addition, he was a "diplomatic consultant" at the Royal Garden Hotel in Kensington.

He died on 5 April 2018 after having suffered with poor health for three years.
