= Alison Blake =

British diplomat

Alison Blake CMG
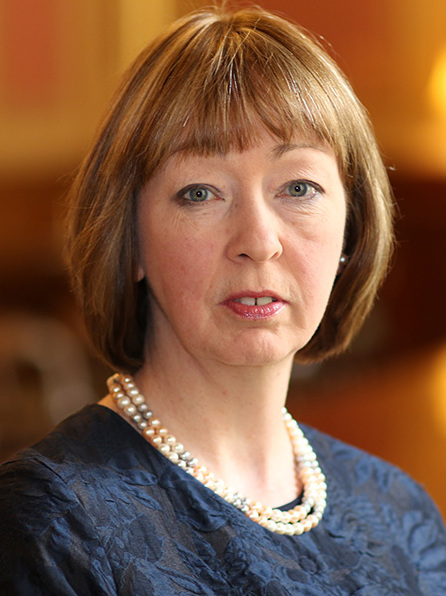

Governor of the Falkland Islands Commissioner for South Georgia and the South Sandwich Islands
- In office 23 July 2022 – 25 July 2025
- Monarchs: Elizabeth II; Charles III
- Chief Executive: Andy Keeling; Andrea Clausen
- Preceded by: Nigel Phillips
- Succeeded by: Colin Martin-Reynolds

British Ambassador to Afghanistan
- In office 2019–2021
- Monarch: Elizabeth II
- Prime Minister: Boris Johnson
- Preceded by: Sir Nicholas Kay
- Succeeded by: Sir Laurie Bristow

British High Commissioner to Bangladesh
- In office 2016–2019
- Monarch: Elizabeth II
- Prime Minister: Theresa May
- Preceded by: Robert Gibson
- Succeeded by: Robert Chatterton Dickson

Personal details
- Born: Alison Mary Blake
- Spouse: Peter Henry
- Education: Merton College, Oxford (MA)
- Occupation: Diplomat

Alison Mary Blake CMG is a British diplomat who served as Governor of the Falkland Islands and Commissioner of South Georgia and the South Sandwich Islands from 2022 to 2025. She previously served as High Commissioner to Bangladesh and Ambassador to Afghanistan.

== Career ==
Blake was educated at Roan School for Girls and Merton College, Oxford, where she gained an MA degree in ancient and modern history in 1980. She worked as an archaeologist for the Museum of London, English Heritage, and the Greater London Council (GLC) from 1983 to 1987.

She joined the Ministry of Defence (MoD) in 1989, where she served as an assistant private secretary to the Secretary of State for Defence. She left the MoD in 1995 and transferred to the Foreign and Commonwealth Office (FCO) and was at the UK delegation to NATO in Brussels, 1996–99; deputy head of the Eastern Adriatic Department at the FCO 1999–2001; at the embassy in Washington, D.C., 2001–05; on secondment to the Cabinet Office as Head of Foreign and Development Policy 2006–07; head of the Conflict Group at the FCO 2007–11; deputy High Commissioner to Pakistan 2011–14. She became High Commissioner to Bangladesh in January 2016, where, in 2017, she received some criticism for apparently lobbying on behalf of British American Tobacco, which was at that time in a dispute with the Bangladeshi government over a £170m claim for unpaid VAT brought by the government of Bangladesh against its subsidiary, BATB.

Blake was appointed a Companion of the Order of St. Michael and St. George (CMG) in the 2018 New Year Honours "for services to British foreign and security policy."

She then moved in May 2019 to become Ambassador to Afghanistan. She was succeeded by Sir Laurie Bristow in June 2021.

In March 2022, the Foreign, Commonwealth & Development Office announced that Blake would be the new Governor of the Falkland Islands and Commissioner for South Georgia and the South Sandwich Islands, succeeding Nigel Phillips in July 2022. She was the first female governor of the islands.

Diplomatic posts
Preceded by Robert Gibson	British High Commissioner to Bangladesh; 2016–2019	Succeeded by Robert Chatterton Dickson
Preceded by Nicholas Kay	British Ambassador to Afghanistan; 2019–2021	Succeeded by Laurie Bristow
Political offices
Preceded by Nigel Phillips	Governor of the Falkland Islands; 2022–2025	Succeeded by Colin Martin-Reynolds
Preceded by Nigel Phillips	Commissioner for South Georgia and the South Sandwich Islands; 2022–2025	Succeeded by Colin Martin-Reynolds
