= Andy Keeling =

British politician

Chief Executive of the Falkland Islands
- In office 5 April 2021 – 31 March 2025
- Monarchs: Elizabeth II; Charles III
- Governor: Nigel Phillips; Alison Blake
- Preceded by: Barry Rowland
- Succeeded by: Andrea Clausen

Personal details
- Party: Nonpartisan

Andrew Keeling is a British civil servant who served as Chief Executive of the Falkland Islands from 2021 to 2025. He previously served as Chief Operating Officer of Leicester City Council.

== Career ==
In September 2020, it was announced that Keeling had accepted an offer to be appointed Chief Executive of the Falkland Islands. He assumed this role in April 2021, succeeding Barry Rowland.

Political offices
Preceded by Barry Rowland	Chief Executive of the Falkland Islands; 2021-2025	Succeeded by Andrea Clausen
