= Ronald Sampson =

British administrator

Ronald Sampson CBE

Chief Executive of the Falkland Islands
- In office April 1989 – September 1994
- Monarch: Elizabeth II
- Governor: Gordon Wesley Jewkes; William Hugh Fullerton; David Everard Tatham
- Preceded by: David G. P. Taylor (interim)
- Succeeded by: Andrew Gurr

Ronald Sampson, CBE, is an English administrator who served as Chief Executive of the Falkland Islands from April 1989 until September 1994.

During his time as Chief Executive, Sampson worked to improve up the infrastructure of the Falkland Islands in the wake of the 1982 war. Following his retirement in 1994, Sampson was made a Commander of the Order of the British Empire by Queen Elizabeth II.
