= David G. P. Taylor =

British colonial administrator (1933–2007)

David Taylor CBE

Governor of Montserrat
- In office 23 May 1990 – 16 July 1993
- Monarch: Elizabeth II
- Chief Minister: Reuben Meade
- Preceded by: Christopher J. Turner
- Succeeded by: Frank Savage

Chief Executive of the Falkland Islands
- In office September 1988 – April 1989
- Monarch: Elizabeth II
- Governor: William Hugh Fullerton
- Preceded by: Brian Cummings
- Succeeded by: Ronald Sampson
- In office December 1983 – April 1987
- Monarch: Elizabeth II
- Governor: Rex Hunt; Gordon Wesley Jewkes
- Preceded by: New Post
- Succeeded by: Brian Cummings

Personal details
- Born: 5 July 1933 Bristol, England
- Died: 8 November 2007 (aged 74)
- Domestic partner: Carol
- Education: Clare College, Cambridge

David George Pendleton Taylor CBE (5 July 1933 – 8 November 2007) was a British colonial administrator and businessman who served as chief executive of the Falklands Islands and Governor of Montserrat.

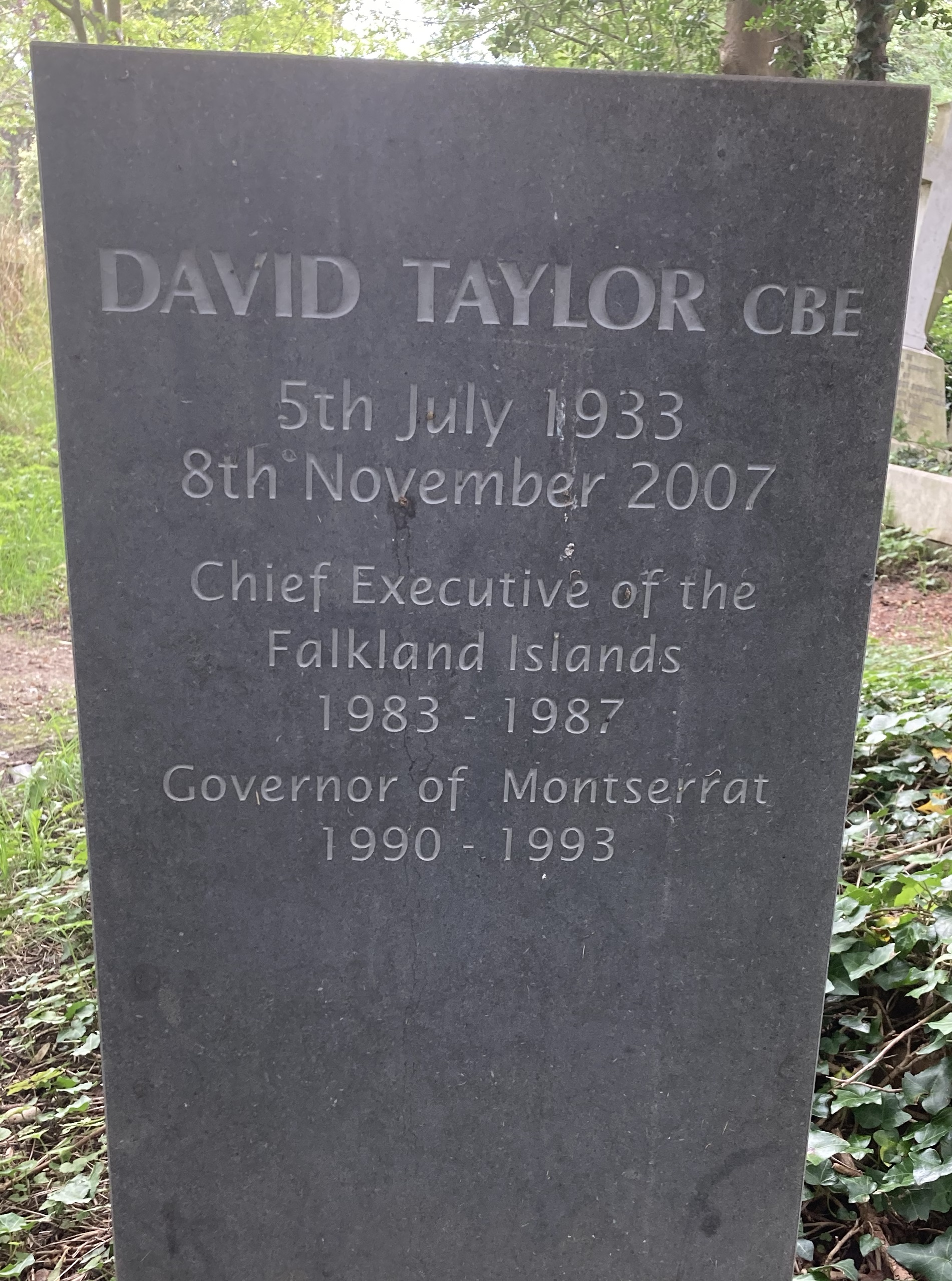
Grave of David Taylor in Highgate Cemetery

Taylor was schooled at Clifton College in Bristol where he served as head boy before winning a scholarship to study English at Clare College, Cambridge. He did his National Service in the Royal Navy after which he was posted to RAF China Bay at Trincomalee, in modern-day Sri Lanka, as a sub-lieutenant (special) in the Royal Naval Volunteer Reserves.

He joined the Colonial Service in 1958 and was stationed as a District Officer in Tanganyika, which was then part of the British Empire. When Tanganyika gained independence in 1964, Taylor went to British Guiana in South America where he worked for Booker as the head of one of the company's six divisions. In 1976, he went back to Africa where he became chief executive of Booker in Malawi and later Zambia.

In 1983, Taylor went on secondment from Booker to become the first chief executive of the Falkland Islands, a post which had been created on the recommendation of the second report by Lord Shackleton. During his four years in office, Taylor was credited with helping the Falklands become self-sufficient following the Argentine occupation, as well as years of stagnation before then. Taylor left the islands in 1987, but returned the next year to act as interim chief executive for eight months.

Taylor then briefly worked as director of a subsidiary agricultural consultancy at Booker-McConnell before being appointed Governor of Montserrat in 1990, helping to rebuild the Caribbean island after it had been hit by Hurricane Hugo a year earlier. Taylor retired in 1993 and was made a Commander of the Order of the British Empire. In 1997, Taylor helped raise money for the reconstruction of Montserrat following the eruption of the Soufrière Hills volcano which left most of the island uninhabitable.

David Taylor died of a lung condition on 8 November 2007 and is buried on the eastern side of Highgate Cemetery.
