= Financial secretary of the Falkland Islands =

The financial secretary of the Falkland Islands is the government officer responsible for economic and financial matters in the Falkland Islands. The role and powers of the director of finance are set out in Chapter VI of the Falkland Islands Constitution. The position was also known as Director of Finance after the new Constitution came into effect in 2009.

The financial secretary is an ex officio member of the Legislative Assembly and the Executive Council, and also acts as Stanley's returning officer during general and by-elections in the absence of the chief executive. The director of finance is not permitted to be a member of the Public Accounts Committee.

The current financial secretary is Pat Clunie, who took up office in 2024.

Year	Financial Secretary
2024–present	Pat Clunie
2022–2024	Tracey Prior
2020–2022	Tim Waggott
2017–2020	James Wilson
2017	Lydia Morrison (interim)
2012–2017	Nicola Granger
2008–2012	Keith Padgett
1991–2008	Derek Howatt
