= Barry Rowland =

British politician (born 1961)

Chief Executive of the Falkland Islands
- In office 3 October 2016 – 5 April 2021
- Monarch: Elizabeth II
- Governor: Colin Roberts; Nigel Phillips
- Preceded by: Keith Padgett
- Succeeded by: Andy Keeling

Personal details
- Born: August 1961 (age 65) Durham, United Kingdom
- Party: Nonpartisan
- Education: Durham University

Barry Alan Rowland (born August 1961) is a British administrator and the former Chief Executive of the Falkland Islands. He previously served as Executive Director for Northumberland County Council and Chief Executive of Newcastle City Council.

== Early life and career ==
Rowland was raised in Durham and gained an MBA from Durham University. He spent most of his career at Newcastle City Council; starting in 1979 as a management trainee, he stayed at the Council for over 30 years eventually becoming Chief Executive in 2009. Rowland entered the news in 2011 after he was caught speeding by a camera put up by his own authority.

In 2012 he left Newcastle City Council by mutual agreement, receiving £215,331 in compensation, after a public falling out with Council Leader Nick Forbes. He went on to serve as Executive Director for Northumberland County Council until August 2015 when he stepped down to "pursue fresh challenges". In May 2016 it was announced that Rowland had been appointed Chief Executive of the Falkland Islands, taking office in October 2016. He was succeeded in this role by Andy Keeling in April 2021, a top-ranking council officer of Leicester.

In May 2017 Rowland was appointed acting Governor of the Falklands following the "unexpected and unavoidable absence" from the Islands of both Governor Colin Roberts and the Deputy Governor.

Political offices
Preceded by Keith Padgett	Chief Executive of the Falkland Islands; 2016–2021	Succeeded by Andy Keeling
