= Andrea Clausen (politician) =

British-born Falkland Islands civil servant

The Honourable Andrea Clausen

Chief Executive of the Falkland Islands
- Incumbent
- Assumed office 1 April 2025
- Monarch: Charles III
- Governor: Alison Blake (2022–2025); Colin Martin-Reynolds (2025–present)
- Preceded by: Andy Keeling

Member of Falkland Islands Legislative Assembly from Stanley
- In office 17 November 2005 – 5 November 2009
- Preceded by: John Birmingham
- Succeeded by: Glenn Ross

Personal details
- Born: 1971 (age 54–55) Guisborough, England
- Spouse: Gus
- Education: Bangor University

Andrea Patricia Clausen (born 1971) is a British civil servant in the Falkland Islands who has been the Chief Executive of the Falkland Islands since 2025. She is the first resident of the Falkland Islands and first woman to serve as chief executive. Prior to her tenure as chief executive she was a member of the Legislative Assembly of the Falkland Islands from 2005 to 2009.

== Early life and education ==
Andrea Clausen was born in Guisborough, England, in 1971. Her family immigrated to the Falklands when she was three years old. She was educated in the Falklands before moving to the United Kingdom at age 16 to study at Peter Symonds College for A levels. She graduated from with a Doctor of Philosophy in Marine Biology at Bangor University. Clausen then moved back to the Falklands to work as a Scientific Officer for Falklands Conservation.

== Career ==
Clausen was elected as a member of the Legislative Assembly for the Stanley constituency in the 2005 election. She was elected as a member of the Legislative Council, which was reconstituted into the Legislative Assembly with the implementation of the 2009 Constitution. Clausen was elected to the Legislative Council at the 2005 general election, but lost her seat four years later in the 2009 general election.

In October 2019, Clausen became the Director of Natural Resources for the Falkland Islands Government. This role had a wide-ranging remit, from supporting the economic growth of the Islands to helping ensure the sustainability of fisheries, farming and natural environment. In 2024, it was announced that she had been appointed to succeed Andy Keeling as Chief Executive of the Falkland Islands Government. She is the first resident of the Falkland Islands and first woman to hold the position.

Political offices
Preceded by Andy Keeling	Chief Executive of the Falkland Islands; 2025-present	Succeeded by Incumbent
