= Glenn Ross (politician) =

The Honourable Glenn Ross

Member of the Falkland Islands Legislative Assembly for Stanley
- In office 5 November 2009 – 26 April 2011
- Preceded by: Andrea Clausen
- Succeeded by: Mike Summers

Personal details
- Born: August 1964 (age 62) Stanley, Falkland Islands
- Party: Nonpartisan
- Spouse: Jan
- Children: Kerri and Teenie
- Education: New College Durham, University of Southampton

Glenn Ross (born 1964) is a Falkland Islands engineer and politician who served as a Member of the Legislative Assembly for the Stanley constituency from the 2009 general election until his resignation in 2011.

In 1979 Ross became an apprentice electrician, he then went on to study at the University of Southampton and New College Durham, becoming a Chartered Engineer in 2006. He married Jan in 1985 with whom he has two daughters. In April 2011 Ross resigned from the Legislative Assembly in order to concentrate on his work at the islands' power station. His seat on the Assembly was filled by Mike Summers in a by-election on 23 June 2011.
