= Commissioner for South Georgia and the South Sandwich Islands =

- Standard of the Commissioner

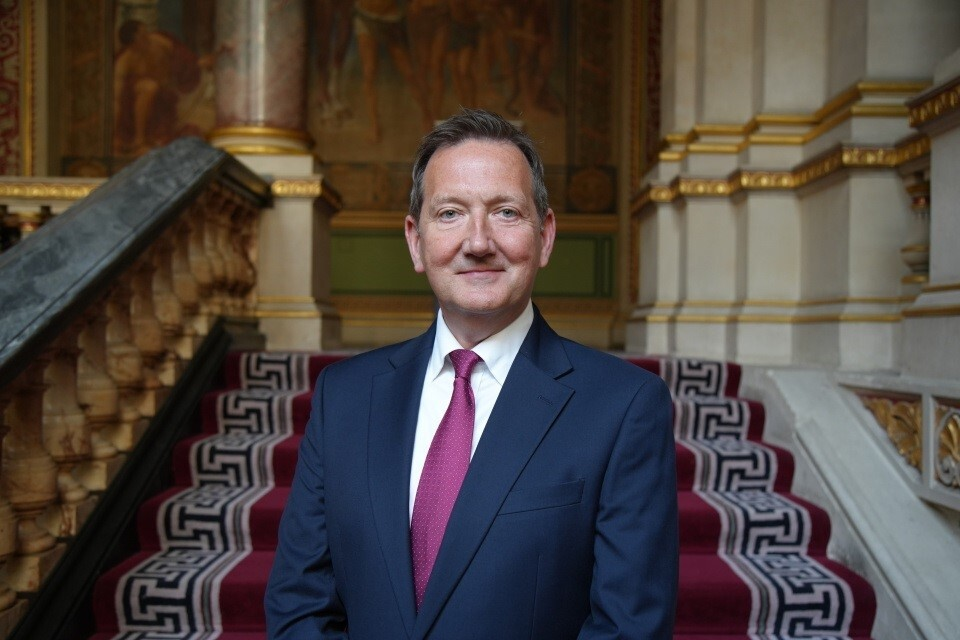
- Incumbent; Colin Martin-Reynolds since 29 July 2025
- Appointer: Charles III as King of the United Kingdom
- Term length: At His Majesty's pleasure
- Inaugural holder: Edwin Porter Arrowsmith; First High Commissioner Merrick Baker Bates; First Commissioner
- Deputy: Ms Jane Rumble; Deputy Commissioner

Flag of the Commissioner for South Georgia and the South Sandwich Islands, 1992–99

The commissioner for South Georgia and the South Sandwich Islands is the representative of the British monarch in the United Kingdom's overseas territory of South Georgia and the South Sandwich Islands. The post is held in conjunction with the governorship of the Falkland Islands.

== History ==
The post was created in 1985 when South Georgia and the South Sandwich Islands was split from the Falkland Islands Dependencies to create a new overseas territory. As the territory has no native inhabitants, and the only population is the visiting military garrisons, and scientists from the British Antarctic Survey, there was no appointment of a governor. Instead the post of commissioner was created, the normal practice for uninhabited territory on the grounds of the scientists permanently based there where no other permanent settlement had been made prior. The post was to be held by the current governor of the Falkland Islands, as that is the nearest inhabited overseas territory to SGSSI, and the presence of the Royal Navy in the South Atlantic allows the commissioner to be transported to the territory relatively quickly if necessary. The commissionership was created under the South Georgia and South Sandwich Islands Order 1985 order-in-council made by Her Majesty's Privy Council.

The commissioner retains the same powers as a governor, and is responsible for domestic affairs within the territory. The British Government retains responsibility for defence and international relations. The commissioner has their own flag for the territory, a Union Flag defaced with the territory's coat of arms. The arms were authorised for the commissioner on 14 February 1992.

== List of commissioners ==
From	To	Name
1985	1988	Gordon Wesley Jewkes, CMG
1988	1992	William Hugh Fullerton, CMG
1992	1996	David Everard Tatham, CMG
1996	1999	Richard Peter Ralph, CMG, CVO
1999	2002	Donald Alexander Lamont
2002	2002	Russell Jarvis (acting)
2002	2006	Howard John Stredder Pearce, CMG
2006	2006	Harriet Hall (acting)
2006	2010	Alan Edden Huckle
2010	2014	Nigel Haywood, CVO
2014	2017	Colin Roberts, CVO
2017	2022	Nigel Phillips, CBE
2022	2025	Alison Blake, CMG
2025	present	Colin Martin-Reynolds, CMG
