= The Falkland Islands Journal =

- Discipline: Area studies
- Language: English
- Edited by: Jim McAdam

Publication details
- History: 1967-present
- Publisher: Jim McAdam (Falkland Islands)
- Frequency: Annual

Standard abbreviations
- ISO 4: Falkl. Isl. J.

Indexing
- ISSN: 0256-1824
- LCCN: 88646647
- OCLC no.: 1803958

Links
- Journal homepage; Online access; Online archive

The Falkland Islands Journal is an annual academic journal covering all aspects of research on the Falkland Islands. It was established in 1967.

The first editor-in-chief was W.H. Thompson, Colonial Secretary to the Falkland Islands Government, who in the first issue wrote that "(t)he idea behind the Journal is to promote interest in the Falkland Islands and their history. Editorial policy is to publish items of interest from the past and present. Politics do not come into it." Since 1990, the editor has been Jim McAdam (Queen's University Belfast).
