= Falkland Islands Magazine =

Former monthly periodical published from 1889 to 1933

The Falkland Islands Magazine (from 1908, the Falkland Islands Magazine and Church Paper), was a monthly periodical published in the Falkland Islands between 1889 and 1933. It was the first regular publication in the islands.

The Magazine was established in 1889 by Lowther Edward Brandon, then the Colonial Chaplain to the Falkland Islands, and later Dean of Christ Church Cathedral. It was published monthly, and contained a wide range of material, including local news and personal announcements, as well as commercial advertisements, shipping notices, and church bulletins. The Rev Rev. C. McDonald Hobley wrote that, "The entire work is produced at “the Cathedral Press ” by the local Cathedral Clergy, aided by two of their girl Choristers."

Notable issues include:

January 1915, No. IX, Vol. XXVI – carried a report on “Naval Action of the Falklands” - the Battle of the Falkland Islands

July 1916, No. III, Vol. XXVIII – report "The Antarctic Expedition" re to Sir Ernest Shackleton's Imperial Trans-Antarctic Expedition, 1914–1917 and the loss of the Endurance, it was written after his arrival at Stanley and before rescue attempts were successful.

October 1916, No. VI, Vol. XXVIII – report on “Sir Shackleton’s Expedition: The Report of Mr. Wild.”, (Colonial Annual Report Falkland Islands 1916, pages 10–11, also wrote about this under the heading of General Observations). It reported the final rescue.

The Magazine ceased publication in 1933. Subsequent Falklands periodicals have included the short-lived The Penguin (1929 to 1938), the Falkland Islands weekly news (active 1944 to 1949), the Falkland Islands monthly review (active 1958 to 1973), and the current Penguin News, published weekly since 1979. In addition, there is an annually-published academic journal, The Falkland Islands Journal (1967 onwards), and a twice-yearly Falkland Islands newsletter, published by the UK-based Falkland Islands Association.
