= Chief Executive of the Falkland Islands =

- Arms of His Majesty's; Falkland Islands Government
- Incumbent; Andrea Clausen since 1 April 2025
- Executive Council of the Falkland Islands; Government of the Falkland Islands
- Style: The Honourable
- Appointer: Governor of the Falkland Islands
- Term length: At the governor's pleasure
- Formation: December 1983
- First holder: David G. P. Taylor
- Website: Office of the Chief Executive

The chief executive of the Falkland Islands is head of the public service responsible for the efficient and effective management of the Falkland Islands Government. The appointment, role and powers of the Chief Executive are set out in the Constitution of the Falkland Islands.

== History ==
Since the re-establishment of British rule on the Falkland Islands in the 19th century, the governor, through consultation with the elected Legislative Council of the Falkland Islands, had almost complete control over executive power on the Falklands.

Following the Falklands War in 1982, Lord Shackleton published a report on the Government of the Falkland Islands which recommended many modernisations, including the creation of the office of the chief executive to which many powers of the governor were delegated. In 1983 David G. P. Taylor became the first chief executive of the Falkland Islands and in 1985 the Constitution of the Falklands came into force, formalising the office. In 2009 a new constitution was established which further defined the role and powers of the chief executive.

== Appointment and powers ==
The chief executive is a civil service position, appointed by the governor on the advice of the executive council. The executive council normally makes its selection through the use of a committee and the chief executive serves a term of three years, which can be extend a further two years at the request of the executive council.

Under Section 83 of the constitution, the chief executive is officially the head of the public service on the islands and the governor can delegate some of the powers of his or her office to the chief executive. In this role, the chief executive is responsible for the implementation of decisions across government, and the efficient and effective management of the government. This includes the generation and analysis of strategy and policy options for the consideration of the Legislative Assembly.

The chief executive is an ex officio member of the Legislative Assembly, the executive council and the Advisory Committee on the Prerogative of Mercy, and also acts as Stanley's returning officer during general elections.

== List of chief executives ==
Name	Took office	Left office	Notes
David G. P. Taylor	December 1983	April 1987	
Brian Cummings	April 1987	May 1988	
Colin Redston	June 1988	August 1988	Acting
Rex Browning	August 1988	September 1988	Acting
David G. P. Taylor	September 1988	April 1989	Interim, 2nd time
Ronald Sampson	April 1989	September 1994	
Andrew Gurr	September 1994	November 1999	
Michael Blanch	January 2000	March 2003	
Chris Simpkins	March 2003	12 September 2007	
Michael Blanch	12 September 2007	3 January 2008	Interim, 2nd time
Tim Thorogood	3 January 2008	1 February 2012	
Keith Padgett	1 February 2012	3 October 2016	
Barry Rowland	3 October 2016	April 2021	
Andy Keeling	April 2021	31 March 2025	
Andrea Clausen	1 April 2025	Incumbent	

== See also ==
- List of current heads of government in the United Kingdom and dependencies
