= Falkland Islands Dependencies =

Constitutional arrangement regarding the administration of various British dependencies

- 1843–1982; Argentine Occupation: 1982; 1982–1985
- Flag (1948–1985) Coat of arms (1948–1985)
- Motto: "Desire the Right"
- Anthem: "God Save the King/Queen"
- Coat of arms of the Falkland Islands Dependencies (1952–1985)

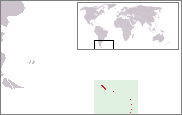

- Status: Crown colony (until 1983); British dependent Territory (1983-1985)
- Capital: Stanley
- Common languages: English
- Monarch
  - 1843–1901: Victoria (first)
  - 1952–1985: Elizabeth II (last)
- Governor
  - 1843–1848: Richard Moody (first)
  - 1980–1985: Sir Rex Hunt (last)
- Legislature: Legislative Council
- History
  - Established: 1843
  - Argentine invasion: 2 April 1982
  - Liberation: 14 June 1982
  - Dissolution: 1985
- Currency: Pound sterling Falkland Islands pound (from 1899)
Preceded by
Falkland Islands Colony
Succeeded by
Falkland Islands
South Georgia and the South Sandwich Islands
British Antarctic Territory

The Falkland Islands Dependencies was the constitutional arrangement from 1843 until 1985 for administering the various British territories in Sub-Antarctica and Antarctica which were governed from the Falkland Islands and its capital Stanley.

== Territories ==
The following are the British territories that made up the Falkland Island Dependencies in the period between 1917 and 1962.

- South Georgia
- South Sandwich Islands
- South Orkney Islands
- South Shetland Islands
- Graham Land
- Antarctic Peninsula

In 1962 the British Antarctic Territory was formed following the Antarctic Treaty System affecting claims south of 60°S latitude, and left only South Georgia and the South Sandwich Islands as Falkland Islands Dependencies between 1962 and 1985.

== History ==
The arrangements were first enacted by the British letters patent of 1843, and subsequently revised in 1876, 1892, 1908, 1917 and 1962. For reasons of practical convenience the Dependencies were governed by Britain through the Falkland Islands Government. However, they constituted a distinct entity that was not part of the Falkland Islands in political or financial respects.

The territorial extent of the Dependencies varied as particular territories were claimed, annexed, and commercially exploited over an extensive period of time starting with South Georgia in 1775. Responding to repeated inquiries by the Government of Norway in 1905–1907, Britain confirmed that the areas in question (between 35° and 80° west longitude) were British based on discoveries and issued the 1908 Letters Patent extending the Dependencies to incorporate the South Sandwich Islands and Antarctic mainland territory (Graham Land), with a permanent local administration in Grytviken, South Georgia, established in 1909.

The territories constituting the Falkland Islands Dependencies in 1908 were listed by the Letters Patent as "the groups of islands known as South Georgia, the South Orkneys, the South Shetlands, and the Sandwich Islands, and the territory known as Graham's Land, situated in the South Atlantic Ocean to the south of the 50th parallel of south latitude, and lying between the 20th and the 80th degrees of west longitude". In 1917, the Letters Patent were modified, applying the "sector principle" used in the Arctic; the new scope of the Dependencies was extended to comprise "all islands and territories whatsoever between the 20th degree of west longitude and the 50th degree of west longitude which are situated south of the 50th parallel of south latitude; and all islands and territories whatsoever between the 50th degree of west longitude and the 80th degree of west longitude which are situated south of the 58th parallel of south latitude", thus reaching the South Pole.

With the accession of the United Kingdom to the European Communities in 1973, the Falkland Islands Dependencies became one of the EU Overseas Countries and Territories under the Treaty of Rome, a status upheld by all subsequent EU treaties. That status of association was later enjoyed by the Dependencies' successors: South Georgia and the South Sandwich Islands and the British Antarctic Territory.

The new international legal regime, introduced in the Antarctic territory south of the 60° south latitude by the 1961 Antarctic Treaty, prompted Britain to separate the part of the Dependencies that became subject to the Treaty. That was done by a 1962 Order in Council that established the British Antarctic Territory, leaving in the Dependencies only the island groups of South Georgia and the South Sandwich Islands, including Shag Rocks and Clerke Rocks.

=== Argentine occupation ===
In November 1976, Argentine armed forces landed and occupied the uninhabited islands of Southern Thule, a collection of the three southernmost islands in the South Sandwich Islands. On 19 March 1982 a group of civilian scrap metal workers from Argentina arrived at Leith Harbour, South Georgia, on board the transport ship ARA Bahía Buen Suceso and raised the Argentine flag. The scrap workers had been infiltrated by Argentine marines posing as civilian scientists. Following the Argentine invasion of the Falkland Islands, starting the Falklands War, Argentine naval forces seized control of the east coast of South Georgia after overpowering a small group of Royal Marines at Grytviken on 3 April 1982.

On 22 April 1982, the British task force arrived in Falklands waters and three days later British troops recaptured South Georgia. On 14 June, Argentine forces surrendered in the Falkland Islands; on 20 June, British forces retook the South Sandwich Islands (which involved accepting the surrender of the Southern Thule Garrison at the Corbeta Uruguay base).

=== Dissolution ===
In 1985, the remaining Dependencies were transformed into the territory of South Georgia and the South Sandwich Islands, dissolving the constitutional arrangement that had existed since 1843 and marking the end of the Falkland Islands Dependencies.

== See also ==
- History of South Georgia and the South Sandwich Islands
- Sovereignty of South Georgia and the South Sandwich Islands
- History of the Falkland Islands
- British Antarctic Territory
- Special member state territories and their relations with the EU
