= Occupation of the Falkland Islands =

Argentine administration during the Falklands War, formally dissolved 1985

Coordinates: 51.6917°S 57.8728°W

Military Administration of the Malvinas, South Georgia and South Sandwich Islands (Note: The Argentine government refers to the Falkland Islands as Malvinas Islands in both English and Spanish.) Gobernación Militar de las Islas Malvinas, Georgias del Sur y Sandwich del Sur
- 1982 (Note: The Territory Administration officially continued to exist until 15 May 1985 when it was dissolved by President Raúl Alfonsín. Since then, Argentina has claimed the islands are part of Tierra del Fuego (then an Argentine National Territory) which became a fully-fledged province of Argentina in 1990.)
- Flag Coat of arms
- Anthem: Himno Nacional Argentino
- Status: Military occupation by Argentina
- Capital: Puerto Argentino (Stanley)
- Common languages: Spanish (official); English (de facto)
- President of Argentina
  - 1982: Leopoldo Galtieri
- Military Commander
  - 2–3 April 1982: Osvaldo Jorge García and Américo Daher
  - 3–7 April 1982: Américo Daher
  - 7 April – 14 June 1982: Mario Menéndez
- Historical era: Falklands War
  - Argentine invasion: 2 April 1982
  - Argentine surrender: 14 June 1982
  - Official dissolution: 15 May 1985
- Currency: Peso (ARL)
- ISO 3166 code: FK
| Preceded by | Succeeded by |
| Falkland Islands Dependencies | Falkland Islands Dependencies |
- Today part of: Falkland Islands; South Georgia and the South Sandwich Islands

The occupation of the Falkland Islands, which had also included South Georgia and the South Sandwich Islands was the short-lived Argentine occupation of a group of British islands in the South Atlantic whose sovereignty is disputed by Argentina.

Until their invasion on 2 April 1982 by the Argentine military junta, they had been governed by the United Kingdom since it re-established control over them in 1833. The invasion and subsequent occupation signalled the start of the Falklands War, which resulted in the islands' returning to British control on 14 June 1982.

== Background ==
The Falkland Islands (Spanish: Islas Malvinas) had been under British administration since January 1833, when the United Kingdom re-established sovereignty over the islands which, at that time, housed an Argentine settlement. Argentina has claimed the Falklands as part of its territory ever since.

The UK first claimed South Georgia and the South Sandwich Islands in 1843, and incorporated them as Falkland Islands Dependencies in 1908. The Argentine Fishing Company had an operation on South Georgia in the early 20th century, and Argentina had claimed sovereignty over South Georgia since 1927 and the South Sandwich Islands since 1938. In November 1976, Argentina landed and occupied the uninhabited island of Southern Thule in the South Sandwich group, which had been in a British possession since the 18th century.

== Establishment ==
In the early hours of 2 April 1982, in the wake of violent anti-government riots in Buenos Aires, the military junta, which ruled Argentina, launched an invasion of the Falkland Islands. Faced with overwhelming Argentine force, Rex Hunt (British Governor of the Islands) surrendered to Admiral Carlos Büsser (the Argentine amphibious force commander) at 9:15 am. The next day, Argentina sent troops to capture and occupy South Georgia and the uninhabited South Sandwich Islands.

Argentina had claimed the islands were part of the then federal territory of Tierra del Fuego and South Atlantic islands. On 3 April 1982, the junta issued a decree which separated the islands from the jurisdiction of Tierra del Fuego and named Brigadier General Mario Menéndez as the 'Military Governor of the Malvinas, South Georgia and the South Sandwich Islands'.

== Administration ==
Office of the Military Governor:

- Brigadier General Mario Benjamín Menéndez- Governor / Chief of the Military Administration (2 April 1982 - 14 June 1982)

Chiefs and Senior Officials under the Governor:

- Brigadier Ernesto Crespo — Air Force representative; commander of Argentine Air Component
- Rear Admiral Jorge Allara — Navy representative
- General Osvaldo García — Army representative
- Colonel Ignacio Guillermo Canevaro — Chief of Staff, Malvinas Garrison
- Colonel Juan Ramón Mabragaña — Secretary-General of the Military Administration
- Colonel Carlos Alberto Quevedo — Chief of Intelligence
- Colonel Omar Edgardo Parada — Director of Civil Affairs
- Colonel Antonio Soria — Chief of Logistics
- Commodore Luis María Zerbino — Air Force liaison officer

== 74 days of occupation ==
On the first day of the occupation, Governor Hunt and officials from the Foreign Office were removed from the islands by the Argentine forces and sent to Montevideo, Uruguay. Argentine troops took over control of the Falkland Islands Broadcasting Studio when Patrick Watts was live on air. Rodney Hutchings, a former school-teacher from Britain that had only recently settled in Teal Inlet with his wife and son, recalls the sudden influx of Stanley residents seeking refuge in the settlement:

Within days of the invasion, families had left Stanley for the safety of the settlements, but they soon returned when they learnt that Argentines were occupying their houses. Many schoolchildren were evacuated to camp and we received children aged from five to fifteen years. With soldiers patrolling our settlement and children wandering around, we felt it would be better if they were safely occupied. I approached our manager who grudgingly gave me permission to continue the children's education in the school room.

Argentina used Spanish while on the islands, including the use of Puerto Argentino, the Argentine name for Port Stanley. Vehicles were told to drive on the right, with painted arrows on the road indicating the direction of traffic. Street signs and traffic signs were changed accordingly, including the use of the metric system. The Argentinian captain Barry Melbourne Hussey, who was chosen for a position in the administration due to his knowledge and experience of English, asserted safety as a major concern, during discussions with the Falkland Islanders: "Which would you prefer, that our eighteen-year-old conscripts, with their big lorries, should try to drive on the left, or that you, with your little vehicles, change to the right?".

Outside of Stanley, most roads were single track anyway and some islanders refused to observe the new rule and continued to drive on the left. Other acts of civil disobedience included Reg Silvey (lighthouse keeper and ham radio enthusiast) broadcasting clandestine radio messages throughout the occupation.

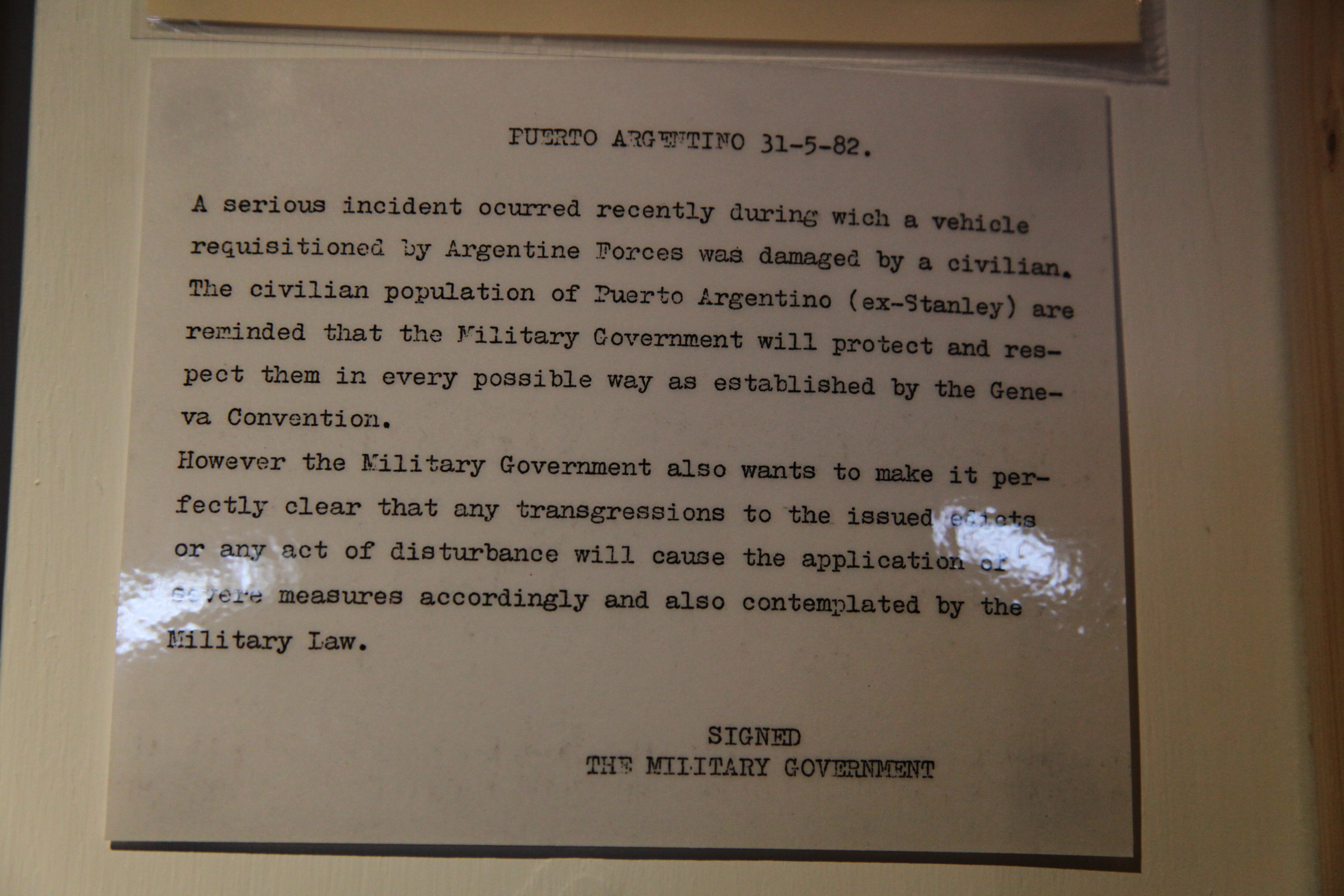
A message issued by the Argentine Military Governor during the occupation warning the islanders against attempts to sabotage Argentine military equipment.

The restrictions imposed by the military government became steadily worse – identification papers, curfews, compulsory blackouts, confiscation of radios and cameras, requisitioning of Land-Rover 4x4 vehicles and soldiers breaking into abandoned houses to steal furniture to use as firewood. Throughout the occupation, Phil Middleton and Steve Whitley would visit the abandoned houses to make sure they were not being vandalized but would also use these inspections as a cover to photograph Argentine positions.

According to Port Stanley resident John Pole Evans, Argentine Air Force Pucarás conducted napalm bombings on 21 April near Stanley as a show of force that coincided with General Cristino Nicolaides's visit as commander of the Argentine Army's 1st Corps that included the 10th Infantry dug around the Falklands capital: "We knew what sort of damage they could do, because during April whilst we were still in our homes, they'd bombed the Tussac Island in the harbour with napalm and it burned for a couple of days. This was like a warning of what they were capable of—that they could destroy the settlement if they wanted to. For them it was probably just some sort of target practice."

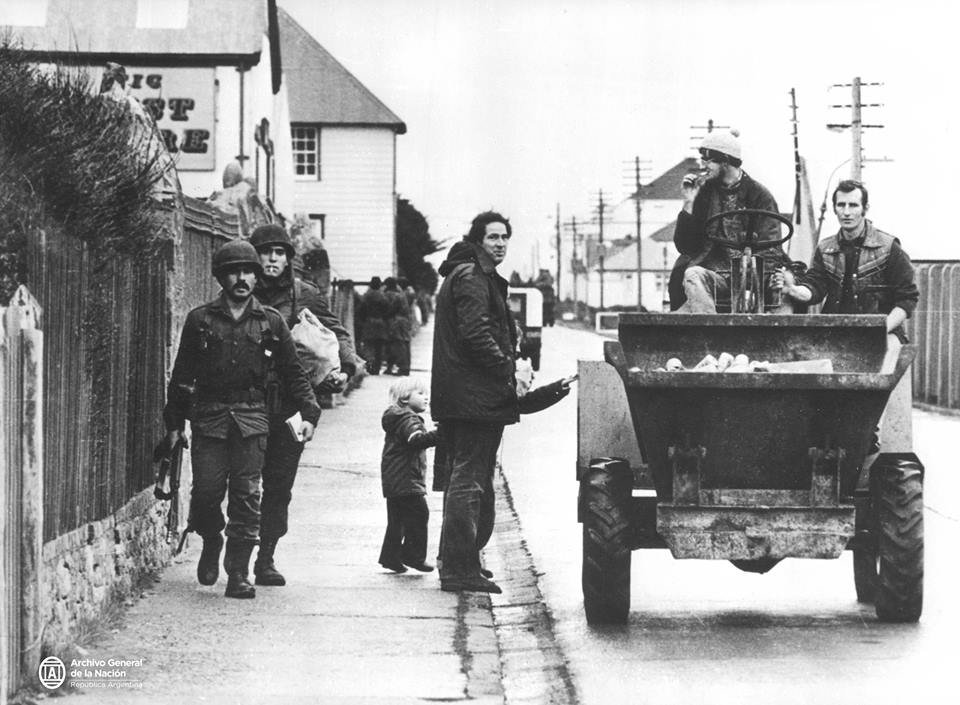
Argentine soldiers and Falklanders in 1982

Residents considered critical of the Argentines were expelled from the islands. This included Bill Luxton whose family had been resident in the Falklands since the 1840s and the editor of the Falkland Islands Times David Colville. This proved embarrassing in the international press and so 14 residents of Stanley considered to be potential troublemakers were imprisoned and were sent to Fox Bay East and placed under house arrest.

On 1 May, a Royal Air Force Vulcan bomber from Ascension Island attacked the airbase at Port Stanley before dawn. Royal Navy Sea Harriers attacked Port Stanley and Goose Green airbases at dawn. The bombing led to the Argentines authorities and local civilians organising civil defence in the Falklands capital and several robust houses were designated Defensa Aerea Pasiva (Air Raid Shelters).

During the occupation, 114 inhabitants of Goose Green were imprisoned in the social hall until released by the British following the Battle of Goose Green. Lieutenant-Colonel Ítalo Piaggi, the Commanding Officer of the Argentine 12th Infantry Regiment, claimed that the lockdown in Goose Green was to protect the locals from attack by enraged Argentine Air Force personnel following the 1 May Sea Harrier strike.

According to local farm manager Eric Goss:

Sanitation in the hall was grim. We ran out of water on the third day, the toilets were blocked and there was some dysentery. We persuaded the Argentinians to bring sea water in barrels for the toilets; an old chap, Mike Robson, did sterling work keeping them going. Two young men, Bob McLeod and Ray Robson, both radio hams, found an old broken radio, part of the club equipment, in a junk cupboard. They made this work and we listened each evening to the B.B.C. World Service; the others made noise at the windows to cover the crackling of the broadcast and we were never discovered.

According to Brook Hardcastle, the general manager of the Falkland Island Company (FIC) based at Goose Green:

After the first week the Argentines let two women go out each day to the galley in the cookhouse, where all the men would normally eat together. They were allowed to cook up a big meal, with bread and cakes, and bring it down to the hall. Considering we were all cramped together in a small place everybody got on very well. People were generally good-natured.

On 4 May the British destroyer HMS Sheffield was hit by air-launched Exocet missile south-east of Falklands and a Sea Harrier was shot down over Goose Green. Eric Goss remembers the shocking news that day and having to intervene to save a local from potential harm:

On the same day, Bob McLeod and Ray Robson made up a radio from broken sets found under the floorboards, we listened to the World Service. We knew about the loss of Sea Harriers, but the sinking of HMS Sheffield came as a shock. Brian Hewitt was tasked to gather mutton sheep on a motorbike and he had a frightening experience in Goat Rincon. The FAA were ignorant of him having permission to be out of the hall, and they sent a Puma helicopter out and fired .50 rounds at his bike. His dogs were scattered and he fell off. The Argentines landed, arrested him, bundled him into the Puma, and transported him back to the Galley. He sat on a chair outside for an hour, in a very shaken state, before I rescued him.

On 6 May, Major Alberto Frontera (second-in-command 12th Regiment) in the presence of the civil affairs officer Captain Arnaldo Sanchez and the Regimental Medical Officer, Senior Lieutenant Juan Carlos Adjigogovich, visited the social hall to ensure the confined senior citizens, Mr and Mrs Anderson and Mr and Mrs Fynleyson, were managing under the circumstances.

The Regimental Medical Officer and an air force medical officer, First Lieutenant Fernando Miranda-Abós regularly visited the social hall with Adjigogovich reporting, "We set up the clinic in one of the local houses. We tried to have a good relationship with them but they looked at us with suspicion. There was a daily medical review and every time they needed a doctor they were attended. I don't know how they managed before we arrived, because they called us quite often, practically every day, for whatever reason." The medical officer in the book Partes de Guerra also describes how the infrastructure of Goose Green broke under the strain of accommodating nearly 1,000 soldiers and local civilians and the British air attacks and naval bombardments that followed.

On 21 May, the Argentine command in Port Stanley sent out a civil affairs team, under Colonel Horacio Chimeno and Captain Esteban Eduardo Rallo to discuss the safety of civilians and to build shelters. Eric Goss again: "I told them to begin this process they should let the civilians go to their homes. I explained that all the eggs were effectively in one basket and that if we were to spread around the settlement then, if the worst happened, some of us would have a chance of survival. In the following days a number of civilians - my family included - were able to move back home."

During the meeting with Vicecomodoro Wilson Rosier Pedrozo in attendance, it was agreed that air force personnel, that were largely inactive after the Pucara ground-attack aircraft had been withdrawn elsewhere, should form a military police unit to protect the local houses from vandalism after complaints had reached Monsignor Daniel Spraggon in the Falklands capital that the soldiers had started to smash furniture in order to apparently keep warm at night.

According to David Colville from Port Stanley, the Argentine military expelled 52 schoolchildren from the Falklands capital and turned the playground of the school into a compound for drilling troops. The Argentine Air Force took over the Stanley Schoolhouse Building with one room serving as the Centro de Información y Control (Command & Control Centre) under Comodoro (Wing-Commander) Alberto Américo Catalá and another becoming the joints headquarters of the air force, army and marine anti-aircraft batteries.

The Argentine peso replaced the Falkland Islands pound and stamps were overfranked with an "Islas Malvinas" postmark and an Argentine postcode, 9409. Bill Etheridge was the Postmaster and continued to operate with his staff under the supervision of Everto Hugo Caballero of the La Empresa Nacional de Correos y Telégrafos (ENCOTEL, National Post Office & Telecommunications Company). The Postmaster recalls:

They moved their own postal people in – three of them, under a Señor Caballero, who was a very senior, very efficient man, a man of very high quality; in other circumstances, we would have found it very easy to work with each other. The Argentinians ran the Argentinian mail and my staff continued to run the civil mail. Most mail from Britain stopped and most Falklanders wrote fewer letters, assuming that the Argentinians were stopping the mail but, as far as I know, there was no systematic censorship or curtailment of the mail. I sent trial letters to a friend in the U.K. and it was acknowledged by a code message in the B.B.C. World Service.

Caballeros was no fan of the military junta, did not approve of the occupation and respected his new colleague Bill. "When all this is over," he told the Islander, "you must come and visit me and we'll have happier times."

On 26 May, with Port Louis, on northeastern East Falkland, already under direct observation from British Special Forces established ashore, the 601st Combat Aviation Battalion was advised that a minor, 11-year-old Allan Steel, from the settlement was suffering from a life-threatening-medical-condition and needed urgent evacuation to King Edward Memorial Hospital (KEMH) to undergo emergency surgery. Under the instruction from General Mario Menéndez, a Huey helicopter was soon prepared and piloted by Lieutenant Héctor Molina, with co-pilot and mechanic Corporal Roberto López and army surgeon Ricardo Rojas aboard. They lifted off from Stanley Racecoursce and flew as low as possible along the coastline to avoid detection from British warships. They reached their destination and brought the sick child back to Stanley, saving his life, for which he thanked all involved in his rescue in a series of emails in 2012.

=== Treatment of islanders ===
The Argentine military police arrived on the islands with detailed files on many islanders. One of their first actions was to arrest and deport noted critics of links to Argentina including David Colville, and Bill Luxton and his family. Such deportations proved internationally embarrassing, as Bill Luxton gave numerous interviews on his deportation, and subsequently detainees were imprisoned at Fox Bay.

Major Patricio Dowling, an Argentine of Irish origin, became the chief of police. He frequently overstepped his authority, ignoring instructions to treat the islanders with respect, and quickly became known throughout the islands for his tendency to resort to violence. Dowling imposed a regime of arbitrary house searches, arrests and questioning. His actions came to the attention of Comodoro Carlos Bloomer-Reeve, who recommended to Brigadier-General Menéndez that he be removed. He was subsequently sent back to Argentina in disgrace.

According to police sergeant Anton Livermore:

The Argentinian military police moved into the station and I got on fairly well with them, professionally all the time and personally when their officers were not present. They were very good really and kept strict discipline among their own army people but Major Dowling was a problem and eventually there came an incident which led to my finishing working in uniform. They sent me, under armed threat, to arrest a civilian and I refused to do it again, only to help out of uniform with that type of problem. They didn't like that answer and threatened me, Monsignor Spraggon sorted that out: I have a lot to thank Monsignor for.

Major Roberto Eduardo Berazay, the officer commanding the 181st Military Police Company, would claim that his unit would win the trust of the Port Stanley residents fleeing to the countryside: "In order to prevent break-in-and-enter crimes, the local residents would repeatedly go to the Police Station to request that personnel from 181 MP Coy enter and occupy their homes during their period of absence, for which they would hand over the keys to their properties, which shows the level of trust won among the local population. Berazay also claimed in Compañía Policía Militar 181: Síntesis de su participación en Malvinas (La Gaceta Malvinense, 2003) that no more than 10 civilian houses were broken into in Port Stanley thanks to the efforts of his men.

Captain Miguel Ángel Romano, a reservist, had been sent to Port Stanley to help take charge of the 181st Military Police Company during the Argentine occupation. According to local resident Patrick Watts: "He took appropriate action against conscripts caught stealing from unoccupied dwellings and tried to help the civilian community as far as his rank would allow."

Les Harris, a Port Stanley resident, describes a typical incident involving two conscripts that had broken into his property:

One morning I found that the ducks had gone. I automatically thought they had been stolen in the night, during the curfew. Children being children, Jane and Ralph said they were going to have a look. Jane came back racing and said, 'Come quick, Dad. They're still there.' I went and found two very young, very wet Argentinian soldiers hiding behind the hen-house in some bushes. I speak Spanish and I gave them five minutes to get off our property. They said they were from the hills and that they were starving. I still gave them five minutes and told them I would fetch the military police. I waited exactly five minutes and then went to the Argentinian marines who were in the social club. The man in charge asked me whether they were army or marines. I said army. He told his men to get their weapons and then set off to catch them. Half-way up the street, they cocked their weapons. They looked very efficient; their marines were always clean and smart. My wife, meanwhile, had found the two children watching over the soldiers; the weren't going to let them get away. My wife was very frightened. The two soldiers had been round the back of the hen-house in the meantime and left the inevitable Argentinian 'visiting card'- they had relieved themselves. They did that wherever they went, specially the houses they broke into, and they seemed to do an awful lot of it, too. I think they were using a lot of bad meat and vegetables in their rations. The marines arrested the two soldiers without any trouble and there were our five ducks-all-dead and some vegetables. We all went down to the gymnasium where the military police were based. An officer came out and said, 'What, you two!' Not again!' and gave them quite a bollicking. He told me I would not be troubled by those particular two again. He also said he would keep the ducks as evidence and would return them tomorrow - but tomorrow never came.

Susan Betts from Pebble Island Settlement recalls the plight of the conscripts and life under armed guard while confined with the rest of the local civilians in the farm manager's house following the Special Air Service raid in the nearby airfield on the night of 14/15 May:

I recall there were many frightened and hungry conscripts. The officers had taken over grandmother's house, and after the surrender it was discovered that the officers had lived in relative comfort with any amount of stores and food, whilst the conscripts had spent six weeks in trenches, cold and starving. They were so hungry they would beg for scraps of food. We were lucky, we had plenty of stores, fresh meat and vegetables, and the women took turns at baking cakes. We had a routine after we were locked up. A couple of us, escorted by an armed guard, would go and milk the cows. The conscripts would queue up outside the cowshed door in the hope of a mug of milk, straight from the cow, to warm themselves up. Sadly this routine was curtailed with our milk supply, when the Argentines eventually shot all the cows for fresh meat. We had good views from the windows of the house and people would rush from one room to another to watch incoming Argentine aircraft being pursued by missiles and shot down, especially prior to the SAS attack.

Comodoro Carlos Bloomer-Reeve, chief of the Secretariat of the new occupation forces, in conjunction with Navy Captain Barry Melbourne Hussey and Monsignor Daniel Spraggon were instrumental in avoiding conflict with the Argentine military. Bloomer-Reeve had previously lived on the islands between 1975 and 1976, when he ran the LADE operation in Stanley and had great affection for the islanders. Jim Fairfield recalls his first encounter with Bloomer-Reeve after he and other Port Stanley residents went to see him in order to obtain monetary compensation for damages and missing items in their homes:

I went back to the house one day and the tin had been ripped off the door. It wasn't the first one and it wasn't to be the last. Any empty house the Argies found they would get in. They would steal anything they wanted and when they would finish they would defecate, I think that's the polite word, and pee everywhere ... What they didn't destroy they would burn in the rayburn ... They had gone through the house and wrecked everything ... And rather than be done with that defecated and peed everywhere, smeared it on walls. So, a wanton act basically. And I think if I remember rightly there were 30 odd houses that happened to in Stanley ... And we made a big long list of the things that were stolen ... and we made another long list of things that we would like and then another long list of things we thought 'Why not, go for it' And we took this list down and the originals of that list are in the museum in Stanley ... We went down and said 'What are you going to do about this? My then father in law Ricky came with us, he could speak quite good Spanish so he was interpreting the words that Bloomer Reeve missed and things and we actually came away from there with a stack of pesos ... He actually did give us money for things that had been stolen, what was on our wish list, what we wished had been stolen and everything else.

Under Bloomer-Reeve's influence, warning signs soon appeared at the entrance of all abandoned civilian houses that warned unauthorized personnel to not enter or face the full-wrath of military law. In an interview with Michael Bilton and Peter Kosminsky for their documentary The Falklands War: The Untold Story (1987), retired Brigadier-General Mario Benjamin Menéndez would tell both British journalists, "There was intense patrolling by our military police and a very strict discipline to ensure that soldiers could not move individually around Puerto Argentino. There were courts martial that sentenced officers and soldiers who had violated these norms. Compensation was paid for anything lost or stolen. I remember that we even paid compensation for a cat which was run over by a military truck. The houses, jeeps and tractors that we used were not requisitioned, they were rented."

Official posters also appeared in the main buildings of Port Stanley, ordering the soldiers to keep the Falklands clean with the slogan MALIMA – short for Mantenga Limpia Malvinas and a bin illustration with Ron Buckett the head of transport, soon drawing over a poster a diminutive local with customary woollen hat and wellington boots with a stump of a cigarette hanging out of his mouth, kicking an Argentine soldier towards a Royal Marine who in turn kicks the soldier into the bin. Buckett would make several photocopies of the altered poster and have them placed all over the Falklands capital.

Doctor Alison Bleaney, with her husband Michael as works manager for the Falkland Islands Company, were kept busy throughout the occupation, with little rest. She was involved in arranging the Argentine surrender on 14 June and discovered that her baby was of great help in getting past the sentries guarding Government House. "I found that I could negotiate with angry Argie soldiers much more effectively when breastfeeding Emma! I always took her with me in a sling on my front when I wished to speak with senior officials, as the sentries' guns would be lowered when they spotted her".

There was no widespread abuse of the population. After the war it was found that even the islanders' personal food supplies and stocks of alcohol were untouched, and Brigadier-General Menéndez, the Argentine governor of the Islands, had made it clear from the start that he would not engage in any combat in Stanley itself. However, in the last day of battle, Private Santiago Carrizo of the 3rd Regiment described how a platoon commander ordered them to take up positions in the houses and "if a Kelper resists, shoot him", though the entire company did nothing of the kind.

There was also no wholesale confiscation of private property during the occupation, but had the islanders refused to sell, the goods in question would have been taken anyway. However, Argentine officers did steal civilian property at Goose Green following the detention of the civilian population, although they severely punished any conscripts that did the same.

== Liberation ==
On 22 April, the British task force arrived in Falklands waters; three days later British troops recaptured South Georgia. Following over a month of fierce naval and air battles, the British landed on 21 May, and a land campaign followed until Governor Mario Menéndez surrendered to Major General Jeremy Moore on 14 June in Stanley.

On 28 May, Darwin and Goose Green were liberated, and the attacking 2nd Battalion The Parachute Regiment (2 PARA) forced the surrender of some 1,000 of the Argentine defenders and released the local inhabitants unharmed. Robert Fox, a BBC correspondent with 2 PARA, reported:

For nearly a month, 114 people had been shut up by the Argentines in a community hall. Their houses had been raided, with furniture smashed and excrement left on the floor. Their storeroom had been looted. The Argentine troops were underfed, and in one house, used by Argentine pilots, it seemed the officers were hoarding canned food. The Argentines committed acts of petty meanness, smashing and stealing radios and shooting at a shepherd from a helicopter as he tended his sheep. Now the prisoners are being made to clear up the mess they made in the settlement.

By the time they surrendered, the Argentine soldiers were already suffering from malnutrition, exposure, trench foot and diarrhoea, brought on by lack of proper food and clean water. During the Battle of Goose Green, a number of houses were hit by small-arms fire or shrapnel. In the documentary The Islanders War (Mike Ford, 2007) Andrea Clausen recalls as a child having to hide under floorboards in the social hall during the terrifying softening-up bombardment on the part of the Royal Navy that took place during nine nights in a row.

Argentine air force medical officer, First Lieutenant Fernando Miranda-Abós was invited to join Surgeon-Commander Rick Jolly's “red and green life machine” medical hospital at San Carlos and helped save several Argentine and British lives. He recalled in a British documentary (Falklands Combat Medics, Richard Hawley, History Channel, 2012), "Doctor Rick asked me if I wanted to work with them. I thought it was a good idea because somebody injured has no nationality. I mean, after being introduced we worked as a team, on good terms".

45 Commando liberated Douglas Settlement and 3 PARA liberated Teal Inlet before the end of May. Rodney Hutchings again:

May 28 was a cold, damp day, with sleet driving across as dusk fell. At 11 p.m., we went to bed by candlelights after marking school homework. We were soon startled by a banging on the house door. We were concerned that it was the Argentines and so didn't answer the door. But the knocking persisted. I opened our bedroom window to hear the words: 'Well, chaps, obviously no one here, we must try the next house.' I called out, 'Are you British troops?', and the reply came: 'We are indeed, sir, men of the 3rd Battalion, the Parachute Regiment.' We rushed downstairs and opened the door to five weary and dirty men in camouflaged uniforms, whom we were astonished but delighted to see. We welcomed Graham Heaton, John Ross, Ian McKay, Stewart McLaughlin and Mack Cox into our home, and as my wife, Jan, prepared the starving Paras a meal, they brought us up to date with the developments around us. We heard of the extraordinary walk they had completed across dreadful countryside from San Carlos to reach us, and for two days they had neither eaten nor had any clean water to drink.

On the night of 8–9 June, a number of soldiers from the 7th Regiment's A Company deserted their positions on Wireless Ridge and after crossing a river broke into the house of Claude and Judy Molkenbuhr in Murrell Farm and completely vandalized the house, along with valuables. The four conscripts involved, Privates Carlos Alberto Hornos, Pedro Vojkovic, Alejandro Vargas and Manuel Zelarayán were killed when their heavily laden wooden boat struck an anti-tank mine on the opposite bank.

At around 1100 local time on 14 June, the fighting for Port Stanley suddenly ended, with Patrick Watts recalling:

Argentine guns which had been inflicting considerable casualties on British Troops on Mount Longdon ceased firing while British artillery which for the previous 3 days and nights had incessantly bombarded the outskirts of Stanley in their attempts to silence the Argentine weaponry suddenly closed down as well. It was as if someone somewhere had flicked a switch at a pre-appointed time! Snowflakes were gently falling; the roads were icy and it was bitterly cold as thousands of young Argentine soldiers abandoned the mountains, ridges, hills and valleys which they had occupied for the preceding 73 days, and walked disconsolately and dispiritedly into Stanley, resigned to their defeat and looking for shelter, warmth and food. Still fully armed they proceeded to occupy public buildings such as the Town Hall, Post Office and Gymnasium and commercial warehouses in an effort to escape from the cold.

In deserted sheds, bungalows and even Stanley Racecourse, British units sought shelter, with Captain John Burgess recalling the exhausted state of 3 PARA:

The city was a mess, with no sewerage, water or electricity. With no food provided, many men began looting the Argentinian food sources until further supplies could catch up with the advance ... Unfortunately, a lot of the battalion who had been based on the eastern end of Longdon suffered from a lack of fresh drinking water. Troops had been getting water from puddles in the peat and boiling it. This was insufficient to kill off all the bacteria, and with the inadequate sanitation, most of the battalion went down with diarrhoea and vomiting.

Local fireman Lewis Clifton describes how the infrastructures of Port Stanley broke under the strain of accommodating and processing thousands of cold, weary, hungry British soldiers and Argentine prisoners of war: "The place just couldn't take it. There was only sporadic electricity and water and the sanitation system collapsed. The streets were ankle-deep in human waste. The stench was awful, really awful, and we were all suffering from what we called Galtieri's revenge. He lost the war but left us ill."

Water was scarce, since Port Stanley's main pumping station had been damaged by British naval gunfire during the final battles, with many Argentine soldiers suffering from diarrhea because of Liver Fluke Disease (found in sheep and contaminated water), forced to relieve themselves in bathtubs in commandeered homes, public showers, the dockyard, and even the desk drawers of Stanley Post Office, in the face of sudden violent bowel movement and with toilets no longer working.

On the night of 16 June, with not enough British guarding Argentinian POWs, a street fight broke out between elements of 3 PARA and the 7th Regiment, which turned into a riot, with the disgruntled Argentinians setting fire to the Globe Store. A company from 2 PARA rushed to the area and order was restored. The Port Stanley fire brigade was assisted by an Argentinian fire-fighting team provided by Captain Miguel Ángel Romano (second-in-command of the 181st Military Police Company) who prevented the fires from spreading across the town.

Claims that the Argentine soldiers had behaved like savages throughout the occupation were investigated with British war correspondents Patrick Joseph Bishop and John Witherow writing:

They had certainly been responsible for smashing up the solid old post office, and the backstreets of the town were littered with excrement. But although fourteen local men were taken from their homes during the occupation and sent to West Falkland where they were put under house arrest, few inhabitants were ill-treated. It was an uncomfortable rather than brutal regime ... There were stories of looting and soldiers defecating in houses but on closer examination this tended to be troops stealing buns from the deep-freeze or sleeping in beds with muddy boots. Some valuables and souvenirs were stolen and houses vandalized but the details of the outrages were vague. Most of the serious damage was done by the British shelling.

Richard Savill of the Press Association reported that many houses had been broken into, "The soldiers looted many houses, apparently looking for food". Captain Roger Field from the Blues & Royals recalls, "We are warned about booby-traps. The wankers have left them for us. I hear someone rigged an abandoned Panhard to blow. What fun if an inquisitive kid had crawled in take a look instead of a cautious Para. I also read of a rigged hand grenade left in the school – true or false, I have no idea, but we are coming to believe it of them."

Struggling to supply their own units, the British commanders were overwhelmed by the number of prisoners of war, who patiently handed over their weapons and then awaited repatriation. Said a worried Rear-Admiral John Woodward: "They are already suffering from malnutrition, exposure, trench foot, scabies and diarrhea, brought on by lack of food and pure water, proper clothing, shelter and sanitation. Even feeding them for a week presents huge problems."

On 17 June, British military police from 160 Provost Company began searching the prisoners of war for concealed weapons prior to embarking them on the British liner Canberra and Norland ferry that would take them back to Argentina. The first prisoners of war to board the ships were the officers and men from the 3rd Infantry Regiment of the 10th Brigade, who were told to dump all their gear, packs, sleeping bags, ponchos and food items on the street leading them to dockyard.

This dismayed brigade commander, Brigadier-General Oscar Luis Jofre, "At the beginning of the march, the unfortunate scene took place of Argentine equipment being dumped all along the street that led to the dock, a route that had been crossed by the already mentioned 3rd Mech Inf Rgt. Once again there had been a change in the agreed plans, ordering that the troops embark only with what they were wearing, since they would be provided with all that they needed on board. Consequently, the shoulder bags, food packs and other items of equipment had to be dumped on the street, a fact that created a truly deplorable situation. These scenes were filmed by cameramen, creating the image of great disorder on our part, when the opposite was the truth".

Independent Television News reporter Michael Nicholson and his team captured all this and the vandalised Post Office on film with the British reporter commenting:

It is easy to criticise an enemy in defeat; easy to believe the half-truths that were rapidly circulating around Stanley that the Argentines have not left the capital as they found it. Their filth and vandalism is everywhere. It looked as if they'd been under siege for 12 months instead of two. Proper hygiene must have been difficult in a garrison of 7 or more, thousand men. But it wasn't helped by turning the floor of the Post Office into a public lavatory with three months of excreta to be hosed away by Stanley's fire brigade. And the narrow streets were used as rubbish dumps as thoroughfares with rotting food and unwanted discarded equipment littering the gutters.

British journalist Andrew Vine from the Yorkshire Post aboard the Canberra compared the worn-out state of the young Argentine soldiers captured at Port Stanley with those seized earlier at Goose Green, noting the demeanour of the marine conscripts and those belonging in army units that had received Ranger-type training:

These prisoners were in an even more pitiful state than those taken aboard at San Carlos, gaunt, hollow-cheeked and starving. The cases of trench foot were even worse, the consequences of weeks in the mountains as winter closed in. It was impossible to picture most of them as part of the army that had put up such stiff fight and costly resistance to the Paras, Marines and Scots Guards in those final, brutal days ... Others, though, were more formidable; a hard core of tough, well-trained and professional fighting men who carried themselves with pride, even in defeat. These were the soldiers who had inflicted deaths and injuries on the British.

On 18 June the International Red Cross reported that it had obtained guarantees of safe conduct for Canberra and Norland, unarmed and unescorted, to disembark the prisoners of war in Argentine ports, and for Argentine hospital ships to repatriate the sick and wounded. A platoon from the 10th Engineers Company remained behind for another month to help clear the extensive minefields.

On 20 June, British forces landed on the South Sandwich Islands and Southern Thule where 10 Argentines handed over their station. 649 Argentines, 255 Britons and 3 Falkland Islanders died during the war.

On 19 July, the 1st Battalion Queen's Own Highlanders arrived in Port Stanley aboard the Norland to take over garrison duties, with The New York Times reporting that day that Captain Brian Lloyd from the Royal Engineers had found a hand-grenade wedged under the floorboards of the Stanley School Building, that in the opinion of the British officer was clearly aimed at causing casualties among the new troops. Captain Lloyd also reported finding booby-traps inside wool and peat sacks in the warehouses and Stanley Racecourse that the remnants of the 7th Regiment and reinforcements from the 3rd (C Company) and 25th Regiment (B Company) had used as their last defence line or rallying points on the morning of 14 June.

== Dissolution ==
The Argentine Administration officially continued to exist until 15 May 1985 when it was dissolved by President Raúl Alfonsín. Since then, Argentina has claimed the islands are part of Tierra del Fuego (then an Argentine National Territory) which became a fully-fledged province of Argentina in 1990.

== See also ==
- Falkland Islands sovereignty dispute
- South Georgia and South Sandwich Islands sovereignty dispute

== Bibliography ==
- Middlebrook, Martin (2003). The Argentine Fight For The Falklands. Pen & Sword Military Classics. ISBN 0-85052-978-6.
