= Falkland Islands and Dependencies Aerial Survey Expedition =

The Falkland Islands and Dependencies Aerial Survey Expedition (FIDASE) was an aerial survey of the Falkland Islands Dependencies and the Antarctic Peninsula which took place in the 1955–56 and 1956–57 southern summers.

Funded by the Colonial Office and organized by Peter Mott, the survey was carried out by Hunting Aerosurveys Ltd. The expedition was based at Deception Island and utilized the Oluf Sven, two Canso flying-boats, and several helicopters.

The photographic collection, held by the British Antarctic Survey as the United Kingdom Antarctic Mapping Centre, comprises about 12,800 frames taken on 26,700 kilometers of ground track.
