= Ingles (disambiguation) =

Ingles is an American regional supermarket chain.

Ingles may also refer to:

== People ==
- Ingles (surname), includes a list of people with the name
- Frank Evans (bullfighter) (born 1942), British-born Spanish matador nicknamed "el Inglés"
- Barry Melbourne Hussey (died 2004), Argentine vice admiral nicknamed "El Inglés"

== Other uses ==
- Ingles F.C., an English non-league football team
- Inglés, a typeface designed by Spain's Nacional Typefoundry

== See also ==
- Ingles Ferry, site of a historic ferry crossing on the New River in western Virginia, United States
- Playa del Inglés, a beach resort in Gran Canaria, Spain
- Inglis (disambiguation)
