= 1993 Falkland Islands general election =

- 14 October 1993

All 8 members to the Legislative Council
| | Majority party |
|---|---|
| Party | Nonpartisan |
| Seats won | 8 |

The Falkland Islands general election of 1993 was held on Thursday 14 October 1993 to elect members to the Legislative Council. Eight Councillors were elected through universal suffrage using block voting, four from each constituency (Camp and Stanley).

It was the last election in which Desire the Right Party, one of the only political parties in the history of the Falkland Islands, fielded candidates.

== Results ==
Candidates in bold were elected. Candidates in italic were incumbents.

=== Camp constituency ===
Camp result
| List | Candidates | Votes | Of total (%) | ± from prev. |
|---|---|---|---|---|
| Nonpartisan | **Bill Luxton** | 228 | 23.0 | −1.4 |
| Nonpartisan | **Eric Goss** | 144 | 14.5 | −0.1 |
| Nonpartisan | **Norma Edwards** | 136 | 13.7 | −6.4 |
| Nonpartisan | **Richard Stevens** | 135 | 13.6 | N/A |
| Nonpartisan | Tony Blake | 100 | 10.1 | N/A |
| Nonpartisan | Neil Watson | 99 | 10.0 | N/A |
| Nonpartisan | Kevin Kilmartin | 90 | 9.1 | −6.3 |
| Nonpartisan | Ron Binnie | 59 | 6.0 | −11.2 |
| Turnout | | 991 | | |

=== Stanley constituency ===
Stanley result
| List | Candidates | Votes | Of total (%) | ± from prev. |
|---|---|---|---|---|
| Nonpartisan | **Charles Keenleyside** | 456 | 17.4 | N/A |
| Nonpartisan | **John Cheek** | 356 | 13.6 | +4.1 |
| Nonpartisan | **Wendy Teggart** | 245 | 9.4 | +1.8 |
| Nonpartisan | **Sharon Halford** | 214 | 8.2 | N/A |
| Nonpartisan | John Birmingham | 208 | 8.0 | N/A |
| Nonpartisan | Terry Betts | 182 | 7.0 | N/A |
| Nonpartisan | Laurie Butler | 140 | 5.4 | N/A |
| Desire the Right | Mike Rendell | 139 | 5.3 | +0.8 |
| Nonpartisan | John Pollard | 130 | 5.0 | N/A |
| Nonpartisan | Ben Claxton | 125 | 4.8 | N/A |
| Nonpartisan | Gerard Robson | 96 | 3.7 | −8.6 |
| Nonpartisan | John Halford | 89 | 3.4 | −3.4 |
| Nonpartisan | Terry Peck | 79 | 3.0 | −14.9 |
| Nonpartisan | Dave Eynon | 61 | 2.3 | −0.4 |
| Nonpartisan | Steve Vincent | 47 | 1.8 | N/A |
| Nonpartisan | Alex Smith | 33 | 1.3 | N/A |
| Nonpartisan | Jennifer Jones | 14 | 0.5 | N/A |
| Turnout | | 2614 | | |
