= Inglish =

Inglish may refer to:

- an alternative spelling of English
  - pih:Inglish, the Norfuk & Pitkern word for the English language
  - Regularized Inglish, a revised English spelling system
  - Ulster English (Ulster Scots: Ulstèr Inglish), a variety of English spoken in parts of Ireland and Northern Ireland
- Claudelle Inglish, a 1961 American movie
- Fort Inglish, the original name of Bonham, Texas
- Inglish (Aurangabad), a village in Aurangabad district, Bihar, India
- Io no spik inglish, the Italian name of the comedy film I Don't Speak English
- Republic v. Inglish, a court case in the Republic of Texas
- a computer parser used in text-adventure computer games, including the 1982 game The Hobbit

== People with the surname ==
- Bailey Inglish, Texas pioneer and founder of Bonham, Texas
- Chuck Inglish (born 1984), American rapper
- Doug Inglish, American photographer

== See also ==
- Inglis (disambiguation)
