= Flag of the Falkland Islands =

Falkland Islands
- Flag of the Falkland Islands
- Use: Civil and state flag, state ensign
- Proportion: 1:2
- Adopted: 25 January 1999
- Design: Blue Ensign with the coat-of-arms of the Falkland Islands in the fly.
- Civil Ensign of the Falkland Islands
- Use: Civil ensign
- Proportion: 1:2
- Adopted: 25 January 1999
- Design: Red Ensign with the coat-of-arms of the Falkland Islands in the fly.
- Flag of the governor of the Falkland Islands
- Use: Other
- Proportion: 1:2
- Adopted: 25 January 1999
- Design: A Union Flag defaced with the coat-of-arms of the Falkland Islands.

The current flag of the Falkland Islands was adopted on 25 January 1999 and consists of a defaced Blue Ensign, with the Union Flag in the canton and the Falkland Islands coat-of-arms in the fly.

== History ==
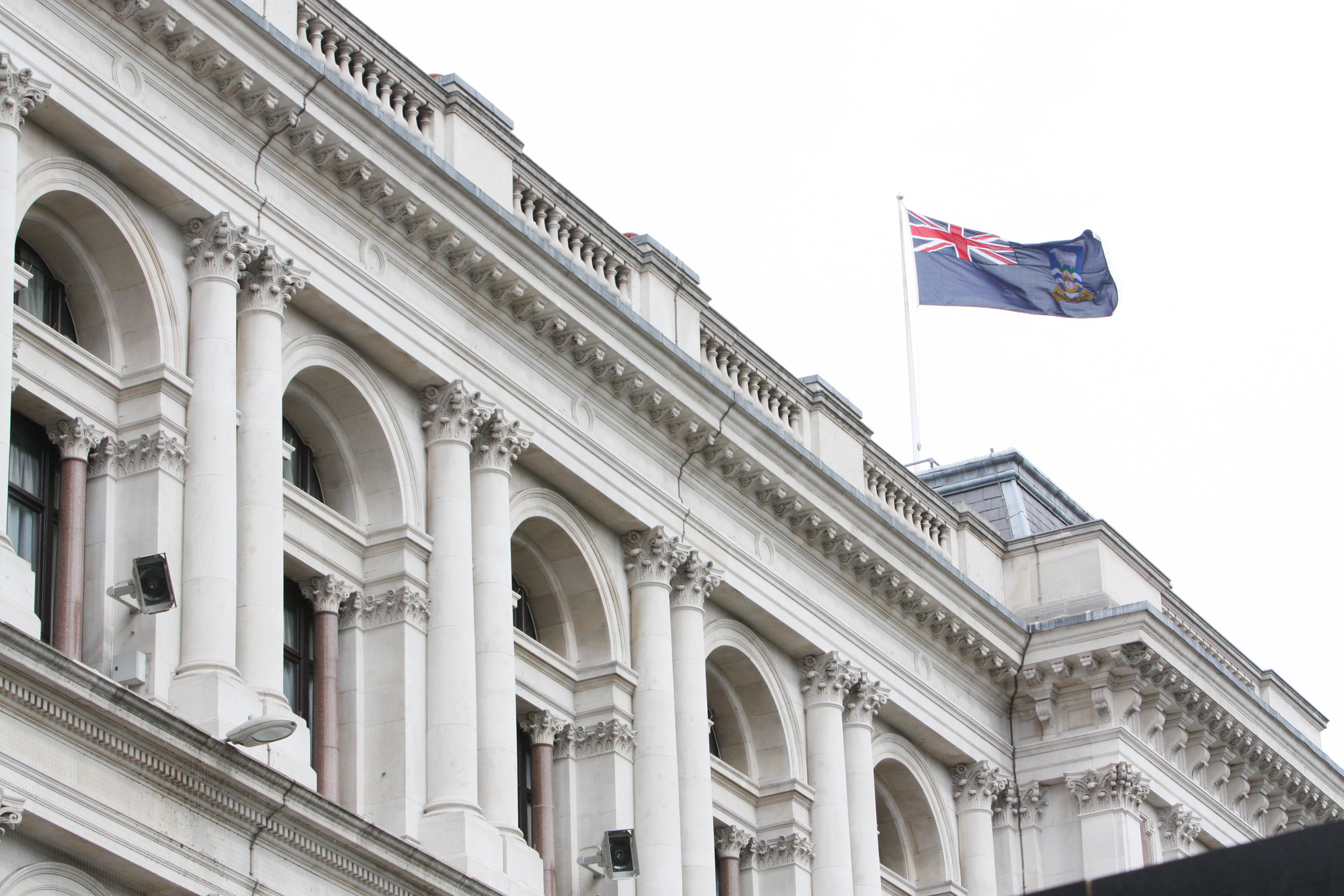
The Falkland Islands flag flying over the Foreign and Commonwealth Office Main Building in Whitehall.

The Falkland Islands have been claimed and occupied by several nations throughout its history, who generally used their national flags on the islands. It was not until 1876 that the islands were given a flag of their own, which consisted of a Blue Ensign defaced with the seal of the islands - an image of HMS Hebe (which brought many of the early British settlers to the islands, including Richard Moody, in the 1840s) in Falkland Sound, overlooked by a bullock (representing feral cattle which once roamed the islands). A new coat-of-arms for the islands was introduced on 16 October 1925, consisting of the Desire (which was captained by John Davis who is reputed to have discovered the islands in 1592) and a sea lion in a shield surrounded by the motto of the islands, Desire the Right. This coat-of-arms later replaced the image of the bullock and ship on the flag.

On 29 September 1948, the flag was updated to include the new coat-of-arms (a ram above the Desire on shield with the motto below) superimposed upon a white disc. The flag was banned by the Argentine military junta from 2 April till 14 June 1982, during their occupation of the islands, when it was replaced by the flag of Argentina.

In 1999 the size of the arms was increased and the white disc removed to create the current flag. The Falkland Islands Red Ensign was created by The Merchant Shipping (Falkland Islands Colours) Order 1998, No. 3147 of 1998, which came into force in 1999 and which contains a picture of the ensign containing the Falkland arms on a white disc. Red Ensign with the Falklands coat of arms superimposed is used as the islands' civil ensign. Previously the plain red ensign was used by ships in the territorial waters around the Falklands.

The Governor of the Falkland Islands uses a Union Flag defaced with the coat of arms. It was this flag that was raised at Government House in Stanley by the Royal Marines at the end of the Falkland War, signifying the liberation of the islands.

== Use of the flag ==
Since its approval, the Falklands flag has been used to represent the Falkland Islanders internationally.

The flag was flown from several HM Government buildings in London, including 10 Downing Street and the Foreign and Commonwealth Office in Whitehall, on 14 June 2012 to mark the 30th anniversary of the islands' liberation.

== Former flags ==
Flag	Date	Use	Description
	1876–1925	Flag of the Falkland Islands	The territory flag, with the seal of the Falkland Islands
	1925–1948	Flag of the Falkland Islands	The territory flag, with the Colonial Badge
	1948– 1999	Flag of the Falkland Islands	The territory flag, with the coat of arms in a white disc
	–1999	Civil Ensign	A British Red Ensign with the Union Flag in the canton and the Island's coat of arms in a white disk in the fly

== Civil ensign ==
For most of the Falkland Islands' existence as a British territory, the civil ensign was the same as that of the United Kingdom, an undefaced red ensign. In 1998, the first warrant for the use of a defaced red ensign was issued, to be effective on 25 January 1999. This warrant prescribed the coat of arms of the Falkland Islands within a white disc. However, a revision of territorial flags issued later that year removed the white disc and enlarged the coat of arms.

1864–1999

1999

1999–present

== Governor's flag ==
Flag	Date	Use	Description
	1876 – 1925	Flag of the governor	A Union Flag defaced with the badge from 1876 to 1925
	1925 – 1948	Flag of the governor	A Union Flag defaced with the coat of arms from 1925 to 1948
	1948 – 1999	Flag of the governor	A Union Flag defaced with the current coat of arms from 1948

== Military flag ==
The flag of the British Forces South Atlantic Islands (which is responsible for the security of the Falkland Islands) consists of a tricolour of dark blue (representing the Royal Navy), red (representing the British Army), and light blue (representing the Royal Air Force), which is defaced in the centre with a motif of the Islands in gold.

Flag of the BFSAI

== See also ==
- Coat of arms of the Falkland Islands
- List of United Kingdom flags
