= Phyl Rendell =

Falkland Islands politician

The Honourable Phyl Rendell MBE
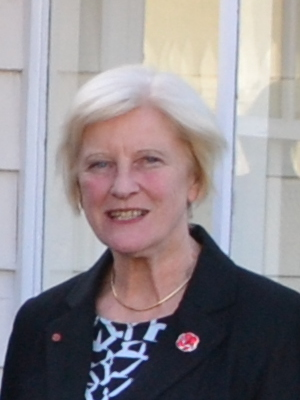

Member of the Falkland Islands Legislative Assembly for Camp
- In office 7 November 2013 – 9 November 2017
- Preceded by: Sharon Halford
- Succeeded by: Teslyn Barkman

Personal details
- Born: Phyllis Mary Oliver Falkland Islands
- Party: Nonpartisan
- Spouse: Mike Rendell
- Children: Nicholas
- Education: Goldsmiths, University of London

Phyllis Mary Rendell MBE (née Oliver) is a Falkland Islands politician who served as a Member of the Legislative Assembly for the Camp constituency from 2013 to 2017.

Rendell was born Phyllis Mary Oliver to farmer John Oliver in the Falkland Islands and attended Darwin Boarding School before completing her education in Derbyshire, going on to study at Goldsmiths, University of London. She qualified as a teacher in the UK and returned to the Falklands to work in Stanley as a teacher.

In the 1970s, she met and married Mike Rendell, who was stationed in the Falklands as part of Naval Party 8901. After working for six years in Saudi Arabia, Rendell returned to the Falklands in 1982 shortly after the end of the war. In 1984, she became Director of the Camp Education Department in the Falkland Islands Government and then Director of Education in 1988.

She represented the Falklands during negotiations between Argentina and the United Kingdom in Buenos Aires in 1995 and London in 1996 over oil exploration in the South Atlantic. Rendell went on to be appointed Director of Oil, and later Director of Mineral Resources, retiring in 2012 to become Chair of the Falklands Offshore Hydrocarbons Environmental Forum. In January 2013, Rendell was made a Member of the Order of the British Empire in the New Year Honours for services to Falkland Islands interests. She was elected to the Legislative Assembly in November 2013, but did not seek reelection at the 2017 election.
