= Desire the Right =

Motto of the Falkland Islands

Desire the Right is the motto of the Falkland Islands. It makes reference to Desire, the vessel from which English sea-captain John Davis sighted the Falkland Islands in 1592.

The motto was adopted as the name of a political party which advocated rapprochement with Argentina, the Desire the Right Party, which fielded three candidates in the 1989 general election, although none were elected.
