= Raid on Limbang =

1962 military engagement

- Part of the Indonesia–Malaysia confrontation
| Date | 12 December 1962 |
| Location | Limbang, Sarawak |
| Result | British victory |

Belligerents
| United Kingdom | Brunei People's Party |

Commanders and leaders
| Jeremy Moore | Salleh bin Sambas |

Strength
| One company | 300 |

Casualties and losses
| 5 killed; 8 wounded | 12 killed; 3 wounded; 24 captured |

The Raid on Limbang (Malay: Serangan/Serbuan di Limbang) was a military engagement between British Royal Marine commandos and insurgents of the North Kalimantan National Army (Tentara Nasional Kalimantan Utara: TNKU), on 12 December 1962. After an amphibious assault on the town of Limbang in Sarawak, Borneo, the commandos managed to rescue the hostages being held there by the TNKU.

== Prelude ==
On 9 December 1962, as the Brunei revolt broke out, TNKU militants led by Salleh bin Sambas seized the small town of Limbang. From the police station, they captured several rifles, Sterling submachine guns and one Bren light machine gun. This greatly enhanced their weaponry, as they had only been armed with shotguns. They imprisoned the British resident and his wife, along with 12 others, and announced their intention of hanging them on 12 December.

== Raid ==
The task of freeing the hostages was given to L Company, 42 Commando, commanded by Captain Jeremy Moore, who were deployed from the commando carrier HMS Albion. To bring the commandos to their target, two cargo lighters were commandeered and crewed by Royal Navy personnel. One of them carried a Vickers machine gun. Moore planned to sail his force up the Limbang river, and then to assault the town directly, so as to avoid giving the rebels time to execute the hostages.

The lighters approached Limbang at dawn on the morning of 12 December. The sound of their engines warned the rebels, and the commandos lost the element of surprise. As they moved into their landing area, they were met by heavy fire from the police station, where Salleh himself was manning the Bren gun. The deck of the lighters offered little protection, and two marines were killed before landing. One craft provided covering fire with the Vickers gun, while the first disembarked its men.

The commandos charged the police station, where they killed ten rebels and captured the Bren gun. Salleh bin Sambas was injured, but made good his escape. The hostages were discovered in the hospital, where the resident was singing loudly, to avoid being mistaken for a rebel. After all the commandos had landed, they spent the rest of the day clearing Limbang house by house, during which three more marines and two more rebels were killed.

== Aftermath ==
British forces operations continued in the area in the following days, and captured 11 more prisoners. The intelligence they gathered suggested that the TNKU force had been undone by the Limbang battle: the more committed fighters had escaped into the surrounding jungle, while the local conscripts had thrown away their weapons and uniforms. Their leader, Salleh was subsequently captured by the British Forces six months after the raid. He was found guilty for bearing the arms against the Crown, and was sentenced to 15 years of imprisonment at Kuching Central Prison. During the trial, he pleaded guilty on all charges, and requested the judges to release the other prisoner, citing that he was willing to take the fall himself and would head to the gallows. However, none of his requests were granted and his sentence proceeded as planned. He was later released in the 1970s, and now resides in Limbang as a Penghulu (village headman) at Kampung Pahlawan.

For their role in the battle, Corporals Lester and Rawlinson were awarded Military Medals, while Captain Moore was awarded a bar for his Military Cross. He later went on to command the British forces during the Falklands War. Jeremy Black, the RN officer who commanded one of the lighters, later became Captain of HMS Invincible, during the same conflict. After this action L Company became known as "Limbang Company".

The lighters were piloted in by Erskine Muton of the Brunei State Marine who was awarded the MBE for his civilian gallantry. Citation in The London Gazette.
