= Desire the Right Party =

Defunct political party in the Falkland Islands

- Abbreviation: DRP
- Chairman: Mike Rendell (1987–1996)
- Founded: 1987
- Dissolved: 1996
- Headquarters: Stanley, Falkland Islands

The Desire the Right Party (DRP) was a political party in the Falkland Islands, one of the only political parties in the history of the Falklands, which has traditionally acted as a non-partisan democracy. The other party that existed in the islands was the National Progressive Party, founded on 24 July 1964 and active for a brief time in the 1960s.

== History ==
The party was founded in 1987 under the initiative from Brook Hardcastle and Robert Pitaluga, local farm entrepreneurs. The party's Constitution was approved in December 1988.

The name of the party is derived from the motto of the Falklands. The party proposed to maintain the sovereignty under British sphere of influence but allowing more autonomy, and advocated limited rapprochement with Argentina but received little support from the Falkland Islanders with its candidates not winning any seats in the Legislative Council of the Falkland Islands in the two general elections the party contested. The party was initially rumoured to campaign on the platform of Falkland Islands independence, though the party executive denied this but it led to suspicions from Falkland Islanders of what the party was representing. In 1989, they financed their own newspaper called The Islander.

The party made a sort of primary election to define the candidates it should present to the 1989 general election. Following the failure of the Desire the Right Party to win any seats, at the 1993 Falkland Islands general election, despite being the only political party active on the Falkland Islands, all of their members stood as independents along with all of the other candidates. It ceased to operate in 1996.

== Election results ==
Election	Votes	Percentage	Seats
1989	217	6.98%	0 / 8
1993	139	3.85%	0 / 8
