= Inglis =

Inglis may refer to:

== Companies and organizations ==
- A & J Inglis, a shipbuilding company
- John Inglis & Company, a Canadian company now a subdivision of Whirlpool Corporation
- William Inglis & Son, bloodstock auctioneers

== Places ==
=== Australia ===
- Inglis County, New South Wales
- Inglis Island, Northern Territory
- Inglis River, Tasmania

=== Elsewhere ===
- Inglis, Manitoba, an unincorporated community in Canada
- Inglis, Florida, a town in the United States
- Inglis Island (Ritchie's Archipelago), Andaman Islands, India

== Other uses ==
- Inglis (surname)
- Early Scots and Northumbrian Middle English or Inglis
- pertaining to England, English people, English language (English) or Inglis

== See also ==
- Englis (disambiguation)
- Ingles (disambiguation)
- Inglish (disambiguation)
