= Barry Melbourne Hussey =

Argentinian naval officer (died 2004)

- Died: 24 December 2004
- Military career
- Allegiance: Argentina
- Branch: Argentine Navy
- Rank: Vice Admiral
- Conflicts: Falklands War

Vice Admiral Barry Melbourne Hussey (died 24 December 2004) was an Argentine naval officer. After serving as a naval pilot he was appointed to the Argentine civil administration after their 1982 invasion of the Falkland Islands, with responsibility for education, public health and social services. Hussey remained in Port Stanley during the resulting Falklands War and played a key role in connecting British officers with Argentine commander Mario Benjamín Menéndez to discuss the surrender of Argentine troops on the islands. After the war he served as a naval attaché in the US and as Deputy Joint Chief of Staff. By 1989 Hussey had been called out of retirement to head the National Security Council (COSENA) established by Argentine president Raúl Alfonsín.

== Early life ==
Hussey had English and Irish ancestry. He was the brother of Joy Hussey, the mother of Golden Globe Award winning actress, Olivia Hussey. When asked by historian Martin Middlebrook how much English blood he had, he replied "not a lot, about as much as Eisenhower had German blood".

Hussey joined the Argentine Navy and became a pilot. A fluent English speaker, he became known among his comrades as El Inglés ("the Englishman"). In 1951 he played rugby for the Navy in inter-services competitions and in the 1956/57 season played for the Buenos Aires side Pingüinos ("Penguins"). In 1974 he was listed as director of a security company in Quilmes and around this time was also a manager of a LADE airline office. On 15 September 1976 he had an accident while piloting a Lockheed P-2 Neptune aircraft and received a formal judicial sanction on 4 October.

== Falklands War ==
Argentina invaded the British dependency of the Falkland Islands on 2 April 1982. Hussey, by then holding the rank of Capitán de navío (naval captain), was appointed to the team of Carlos Bloomer-Reeve, secretary-general of the civil administration, with responsibility for education, public health and social services. Hussey had no previous connection to the Falklands or expertise in civil administration but was told he had been chosen for the post because of his knowledge of the English language and customs. He arrived in the capital, Port Stanley on 4 April and set up a headquarters in the former British Secretariat Building.

A British task force was sent to recapture the islands, in the Falklands War. During the war Hussey permitted schoolchildren boarding at Port Stanley to communicate with their parents across the islands by radio, in spite of security concerns. British forces landed at San Carlos in late May and quickly advanced on Port Stanley. During this time Hussey recalled enduring British shelling by pinning a blanket over his window and reading by torchlight.

As the British approached Port Stanley they broadcast radio appeals calling on the Argentines to surrender to avoid fighting in the town, which was still occupied by civilians. The transmissions were made on a British frequency that the Argentinians had been ordered not to listen to, but were heard by British medical doctor Alison Bleaney at Port Stanley's hospital. She knew Hussey from his medical responsibilities and told him of the broadcasts. Hussey gave her permission to respond, but not to indicate he was listening, and she was told this was the last chance for surrender. Hussey consulted with Bloomer-Reeve and afterwards received permission from Mario Benjamín Menéndez, the Argentine commander in the islands, to arrange a meeting which led to the surrender of Argentine troops on the islands and the end of the war on 14 June. Whilst a prisoner of war awaiting repatriation Hussey read books of Shakespeare plays that the British troops had brought with them.

== Later career and death ==
By 1986 Hussey was a rear admiral and serving as naval attaché to the Argentine embassy in the US. He was based at Bethesda, Maryland, and accompanied by his wife, Julia S. de Hussey. In 1987 he was appointed Deputy Joint Chief of Staff of the Argentine armed forces. On 1 June 1988 Hussey was appointed an officer of the Argentine Order of Merit. That same year he authorised the re-establishment of a rugby team at the naval academy. Hussey briefly retired but returned by 1989, in the rank of vice admiral, to head the National Security Council (COSENA) established by Argentine president Raúl Alfonsín.

Hussey was later president of the High Level S.A., until it was dissolved on 3 October 1997. He died on 24 December 2004.
