= Coat of arms of the Falkland Islands =

National coat of arms

- Adopted: 29 September 1948
- Shield: Per fess azure and barry wavy argent and azure, in chief a ram proper upon a grassy mount issuant from the division vert, and in base a galley proper, its mainsail charged with five estoiles
- Motto: Desire the Right

The coat of arms of the Falkland Islands is the heraldic device consisting of a shield charged with a ram on tussock grass in a blue field at the top and a sailing ship on white and blue wavy lines underneath. Adopted in 1948, it has been the coat of arms of the Falkland Islands since 29 September of that year, except for the two-month occupation of the territory during the Falklands War in 1982. The escutcheon is featured on the flag of the territory. The ram represents the territory's past primary industry of sheep farming, while the ship symbolises the Desire which reportedly first sighted the islands at the end of the 16th century. The grass indicates the vegetation of the Falklands.

== History ==
The Falkland Islands were reportedly first spotted by the English navigator John Davis on 14 August 1592. The earliest conclusive sighting of the islands was done by Sebald de Weert around eight years later. This was followed by the first documented landing in 1690 by John Strong, who named the sound dividing the two largest islands after Anthony Cary, 5th Viscount Falkland. The name was subsequently extended to the islands themselves. Sovereignty over the Falklands changed hands between the British and the Spanish throughout the 18th century. The United Provinces of South America asserted its sovereignty over the islands in 1820, four years after the United Provinces declared its independence from Spain. However, the British sent a military force to the Falklands in early 1833 to expel Argentine officials there and proceeded to appoint the territory's first governor eight years later.

The Falklands were placed on the United Nations list of non-self-governing territories in 1946. Two years later, a Royal Warrant was issued on 29 September granting the territory its own coat of arms. It was consequently employed on the Blue Ensign to create the flag of the territory that same year after authorisation was granted by the Admiralty. These symbols were briefly displaced during the Argentine occupation of the islands from April 1982 until the end of the Falklands War a little over two months later. The flag was redesigned in 1999, with the size of the coat of arms increased, and the white disc removed and replaced with a white outline.

The Falkland Islands
Emblem	Period of use	Notes
	1876–1925	In 1876 the islands were granted a seal consisting of an image of HMS Hebe (which brought many of the early British settlers to the islands, including Richard Moody, in the 1840s) in Falkland Sound, overlooked by a bullock (representing wild cattle which once roamed the islands).
	1925–1948	A new coat of arms for the islands was introduced on 16 October 1925, consisting of the Desire sinister and a sea lion dexter in a shield (per bend or and azure) with the motto of the islands DESIRE THE RIGHT on a plaited strap as a slogan. Currently used by the Falkland Islands Defence Force as a badge.

== Design ==
=== Symbolism ===
The colours and objects on the coat of arms carry cultural, political, and regional meanings. The ship from the Tudor period represents the Desire, the vessel in which John Davis is reputed to have sighted the Falkland Islands in 1592. The ram epitomises sheep farming, which was historically the principal industry of the islands, together with the production of wool. The importance of these industries declined after the establishment of a 240 km (150 mi) fisheries zone around the territory, which was announced in October 1986 and took effect in February of the following year. The tussock grass that the ram is standing on evokes the native vegetation of the Falklands. The motto on a ribbon scroll under the escutcheon, Desire the Right, alludes to the name of the aforementioned ship.

=== Uses ===
Both the shield and motto from the arms are featured on the flag of the Falkland Islands, and on the standard of the territory's governor.

== See also ==
- List of coats of arms of the United Kingdom and dependencies
- Coat of arms of the British Antarctic Territory
- Flag of the Falkland Islands
