= Englis =

Englis may refer to:

- English language or englis in Middle English

== People with the surname ==
- Charles M. Englis, joiner subcontractor to the W. & A. Fletcher Company
- John Englis, shipbuilder of the USRC Ashuelot
- Karel Engliš (1880–1961), Czech Minister of Finance over the Czech National Bank
- Manuel Englis, member of the Zamboanga City Council in the 2019 Zamboanga City local elections

== See also ==
- English (disambiguation)
- Inglis (disambiguation)
