= Jeremy Moore =

British Royal Marine officer (1928–2007)

Major-General Sir Jeremy Moore KCB OBE MC*
- Moore holding up the Argentine surrender document in 1982.
- Born: 5 July 1928
- Died: 15 September 2007 (aged 79)
- Military career
- Allegiance: United Kingdom
- Branch: Royal Marines
- Service years: 1947–1983
- Rank: Major-General
- Commands: Falkland Islands(14–24 June 1982); 3 Commando Brigade; Royal Marines School of Music; 42 Commando
- Conflicts: Malayan Emergency; Turkish invasion of Cyprus; Indonesia–Malaysia confrontation Operation Banner; Falklands War
- Awards: Knight Commander of the Order of the Bath; Officer of the Order of the British Empire; Military Cross & Bar

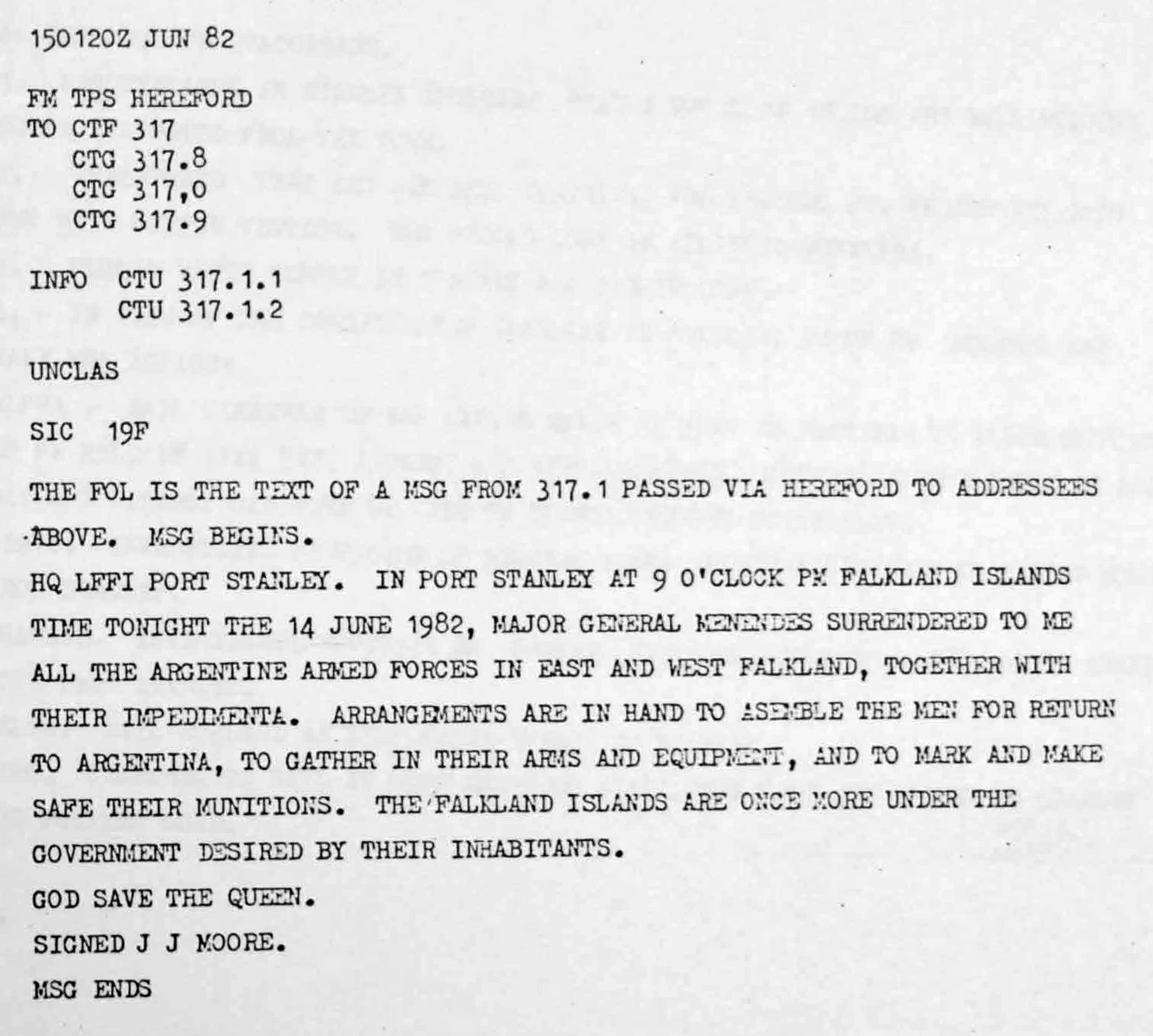
British telegram reporting the Argentine surrender in the Falklands war

Major-General Sir John Jeremy Moore, KCB, OBE, MC & Bar (5 July 1928 – 15 September 2007) was a British senior Royal Marines officer who served as the commander of the British land forces during the Falklands War in 1982. Moore received the surrender of the Argentine forces on the islands.

== Family background ==
Moore came from a military family. His father, Lieutenant Colonel Charles Moore, and paternal grandfather, who joined the York and Lancaster Regiment as a private, were both awarded the Military Cross in 1916 during the First World War. His maternal grandfather was wounded at Tel el-Kebir in 1880, and later commanded the 4th Hussars.

== Education ==
Moore was educated at Brambletye School in East Grinstead in Sussex and at Cheltenham College. He intended to join the Fleet Air Arm after leaving school, but was discouraged by relatively poor exam results. He joined the Royal Marines in 1947, intending to transfer, and enjoyed Royal Marine service so much that he spent the next 36 years in the Corps. After basic training, and service at sea in the cruiser HMS Sirius, he joined X Troop of 40 Commando in Malaya in November 1950, during the Malayan Emergency. He first received a major military accolade in 1952 when he was awarded the Military Cross for gallantry after he and his men fought a pitched battle with communist insurgents in the Malayan jungle.

After attending the Australian Army Staff College from 1963 to 1964, Moore served with the 17th Gurkha Division in Borneo in 1965, countering Indonesian insurgents, and was Assistant Secretary to the Chiefs of Staff Committee at the Ministry of Defence from 1966 to 1968. He served as amphibious operations officer on HMS Bulwark in 1968 to 1969.

== Career ==
Moore served as Housemaster of the Royal Marines School of Music in Deal, Kent in 1954, as an instructor at the NCO's School, as adjutant with 45 Commando from 1957 to 1959, spending much time in operations against EOKA in Cyprus, and then as an instructor at the Royal Military Academy, Sandhurst until 1962. He was posted to Brunei to join 42 Commando as a company commander and later adjutant. While a company commander, he was awarded a Bar to the Military Cross in December 1962 when he led an attack against rebels holding the town of Limbang in the Sarawak area of Borneo, rescuing British and Australian hostages. He and his men were ferried across a river by Royal Navy Lieutenant Jeremy Black, who went on to command HMS Invincible in the Falklands War.

Promoted to lieutenant colonel in 1971, Moore was given command of 42 Commando, completing two tours of duty in Northern Ireland, one in the then Provisional Irish Republican Army (IRA) stronghold of New Lodge. This included participation in the high-profile Operation Motorman to eliminate areas proclaimed by the IRA as "no-go" to the Army and police. He was appointed an Officer of the Order of the British Empire in 1973.

Moore commanded the Royal Marines School of Music from 1973 to 1975, and then studied at the Royal College of Defence Studies in 1976. He commanded 3 Commando Brigade from 1977-1979. On promotion he was appointed Major General Royal Marine Commando Forces. He was on the verge of retirement in 1981 when the Commandant General Royal Marines, Lieutenant General Sir Steuart Pringle, was badly injured by a bomb planted by the IRA. Moore remained as Major General Commando Forces to cover for Pringle while he recovered. He was appointed a Companion of the Order of the Bath in 1982.

When Argentina invaded the Falkland Islands on 2 April 1982 Moore joined the task force planning team at Northwood before flying south to take command of land forces in theatre. Moore relieved Brigadier Julian Thompson as the land forces commander when he arrived shortly before the 5th Infantry Brigade, travelling ahead on HMS Antrim to reach the islands on 30 May. Moore implemented the plans proposed by Thompson, with the British soldiers and marines forced to march across the arduous terrain of East Falkland island in the absence of sufficient helicopters, and assault and overcome Argentine resistance outside Port Stanley. He accepted the surrender of the Argentine commander, General de Brigada Mario Menéndez, in Port Stanley on 15 June 1982.

Moore was advanced to Knight Commander of the Order of the Bath on 11 October 1982 "in recognition of service within the operations in the South Atlantic", and left the Marines in 1983. He became Director General of the Food Manufacturers Federation, but left 18 months later. Later in life, he raised money for research into liver diseases after having a liver transplant. He was Colonel Commandant of the Royal Marines from 1990 to 1993, and joined the parade to commemorate the 25th anniversary of the Falklands War at Horse Guards Parade and the Mall on 17 June 2007.

== Family ==
Moore married his wife, Veryan, in 1966. They had two daughters and a son. In later years, he suffered from arthritis and prostate cancer. Moore died on 15 September 2007, aged 79, survived by his wife and three children.
