= Mike Rendell =

The Honourable Mike Rendell

Member of the Falkland Islands Legislative Assembly for Camp
- In office 17 November 2005 – 5 November 2009
- Preceded by: Roger Anthony Edwards
- Succeeded by: Sharon Halford

Chairman of Desire the Right Party
- In office 1987–1996
- Preceded by: Party founded
- Succeeded by: Party dissolved

Personal details
- Born: 1944 (age 81–82) Devon, England
- Party: Nonpartisan
- Other political affiliations: Desire the Right Party (1987–96)
- Spouse: Phyl Oliver

Military service
- Allegiance: United Kingdom; Falkland Islands
- Branch/service: Royal Marines (1963–76); Falkland Islands Defence Force (1982–87)
- Years of service: 1963–76; 1982–87
- Unit: Special Boat Service; Naval Party 8901
- Battles/wars: Indonesia–Malaysia confrontation

Michael Rendell (born 1944) is a British-born Falkland Islands politician and former Royal Marine who served as a Member of the Legislative Assembly for the Camp constituency from 2005 until 2009. Rendell was elected as a Member of the Legislative Council, which was reconstituted into the Legislative Assembly with the implementation of the 2009 Constitution.

Rendell grew up in Devon and joined the Royal Marines aged sixteen, going on to serve in the Special Boat Service. In the 1970s Rendell was stationed in the Falkland Islands as part of Naval Party 8901. It was during this time that he met and married Falkland Islander Phyl Oliver. After working for six years in Saudi Arabia, Rendell returned to the Falklands in 1982, serving as a member of the Falkland Islands Defence Force. In 1987 he became a founding member of the Desire the Right Party (one of the few political parties in the islands' history). The party fielded three candidates in the 1989 general election, none of whom were elected. Rendell was also a trustee of the Museum and National Trust, chaired the Media Trust, and was a director of Seafish (Falklands) Limited.

Rendell was elected to the Legislative Council at the 2005 general election, but did not stand for re-election in the 2009 general election.
