= 1989 Falkland Islands general election =

The Falkland Islands general election of 1989 was held on Thursday 12 October 1989 to elect members to the Legislative Council. Eight Councillors were elected through universal suffrage using block voting, four from each constituency (Camp and Stanley).

Three candidates stood for the Desire the Right Party, one of the only political parties in the history of the Falkland Islands which normally acts as a non-partisan democracy, however none of the party's candidates were elected.

== Results ==
Candidates in bold were elected. Candidates in italic were incumbents.

=== Camp constituency ===
Camp result
List	Candidates	Votes	Of total (%)	± from prev.
Nonpartisan	**Bill Luxton**	239	24.4	N/A
Nonpartisan	**Norma Edwards**	197	20.1	N/A
Nonpartisan	**Ron Binnie**	169	17.2	N/A
Nonpartisan	**Kevin Kilmartin**	151	15.4	N/A
Nonpartisan	Eric Goss	143	14.6	N/A
Desire the Right	Ann Robertson	64	6.5	N/A
Nonpartisan	Fred Clark	17	1.7	N/A
Turnout		980		

=== Stanley constituency ===
Stanley result
List	Candidates	Votes	Of total (%)	± from prev.
Nonpartisan	**Harold Rowlands**	386	18.1	N/A
Nonpartisan	**Terry Peck**	381	17.9	+10.4
Nonpartisan	**Gavin Short**	280	13.1	N/A
Nonpartisan	**Gerrard "Fred" Robson**	262	12.3	N/A
Nonpartisan	John Cheek	202	9.5	−1.6
Nonpartisan	Wendy Teggart	161	7.6	N/A
Nonpartisan	John Halford	145	6.8	N/A
Nonpartisan	Christel Mercer	103	4.8	N/A
Desire the Right	Mike Rendell	95	4.5	N/A
Desire the Right	Tim Miller	58	2.7	N/A
Nonpartisan	Dave Eynon	57	2.7	N/A
Turnout		2130		
