= Desire (ship) =

Ship sailed by 16th-century explorers Thomas Cavendish and John Davis

the coat of arms of the Falkland Islands in use from 1925 to 1948; depicting the Desire.

Desire was the 120 ton flagship Thomas Cavendish built for his highly successful 1586–1588 circumnavigation of the globe. Desire was only the third ship to circumnavigate the globe after Victoria of Ferdinand Magellan (journey completed by Juan Sebastián Elcano) and Golden Hind of Francis Drake. After this expedition Cavendish was knighted by Queen Elizabeth I of England who was invited to a dinner aboard Desire.

Thomas Eldred who sailed with Thomas Cavendish in the 1586–1588 voyage of circumnavigation had three paintings on an over-mantel. A ship, a globe with inscriptions noting the voyage and, a portrait of Thomas Eldred holding navigational instruments. It is believed the painting of the ship is most likely Desire. The mantel is currently in owned by the Christchurch Mansion.

The ship was later captained by John Davis on the second, unsuccessful, Cavendish expedition. On that same expedition it was the ship he captained when he probably discovered the Falkland Islands. Davis brought the ship back, in a wretched state, to Berehaven in Ireland on 14 June 1593. Only Davis and fifteen crewmen survived out of an original 76 on the ship.

Port Desire in Patagonia was named by Cavendish in 1586 after his ship and later became known by the Spanish translation of the name, Puerto Deseado.

Before his death, which occurred on the voyage home from the ill-fated second expedition, Cavendish made his will, bequeathing Desire to Sir George Carey.

== See also ==
- Dainty, English ship built for the same purpose as Desire
