= Mario Benjamín Menéndez =

Argentinian military officer (1930–2015)

Mario Benjamin Menéndez
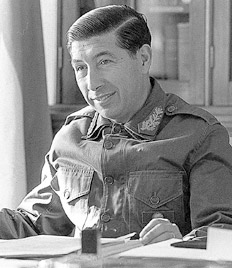
- General Menendez during Operation Independence

Military Governor of the Islas Malvinas , South Georgia and the South Sandwich Islands
- In office 7 April 1982 – 14 June 1982
- President: Leopoldo Galtieri
- Preceded by: Oswaldo Jorge Garcia and Américo Daher
- Succeeded by: (post abolished); Rex Hunt (as Governor of Falklands Islands)

Personal details
- Born: 3 April 1930 Buenos Aires, Argentina
- Died: 18 September 2015 (aged 85)
- Spouse: Susana Arguello (m. 1955)
- Children: 3 (2 daughters, 1 son)
- Education: Colegio Militar de la Nación

Military service
- Branch/service: Argentine Army
- Rank: Brigadier general
- Battles/wars: Falklands War

Mario Benjamin Menéndez (3 April 1930 – 18 September 2015) was the Argentine governor of the Falklands during the 1982 Argentine occupation of the islands. He also served in the Argentine Army. Menéndez surrendered Argentine forces to British armed forces during the Falklands War.

== Early life ==
Menéndez attended the national military college. As a full colonel serving in the 5th Infantry Brigade, he participated between July 1975 and January 1976 in Operativo Independencia, a counter-insurgency campaign against the People's Revolutionary Army operating in Tucumán Province. He later commanded the 6th Mountain Brigade in Neuquén Province. In March 1982, Menéndez (according to historian Max Hastings and columnist Simon Jenkins) was a general in the Argentine Army, and the commander of the Buenos Aires first corps. According to his memoirs, Menéndez was also a member of the Military Committee in Buenos Aires that addressed the Argentine president on a weekly basis on a range of issues, including foreign diplomacy, military training and the military budget.

== Falklands War ==
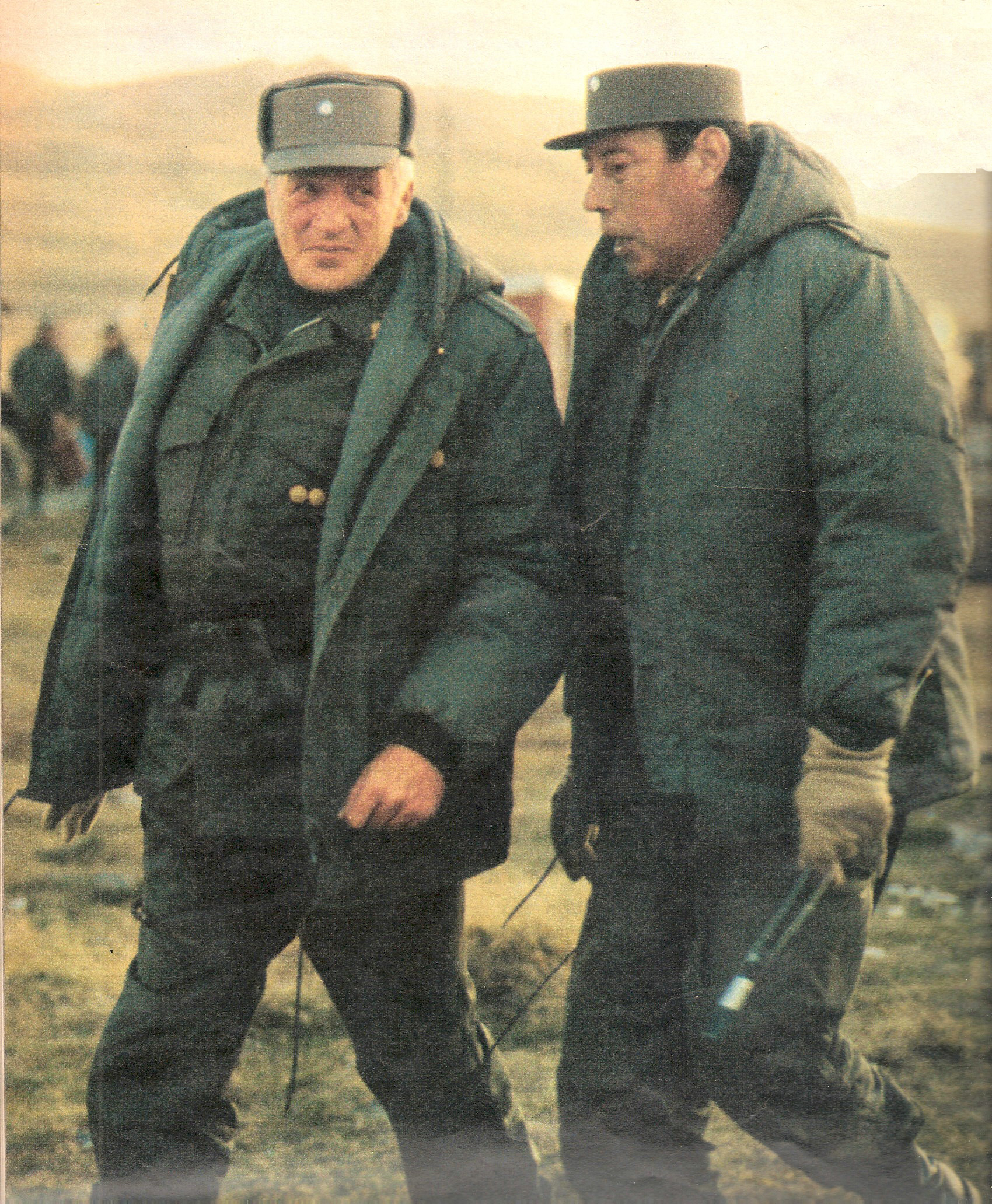
Menendez with Leopoldo Galtieri after the 1982 invasion of the Falkland Islands

On 2 April 1982, Argentine forces invaded the British territory of the Falkland Islands, and gained control. On 3 April, British Prime Minister Margaret Thatcher announced that British forces had been dispatched to recapture the islands. Menéndez arrived in Stanley (the capital of the Falkland Islands) on 7 April, to take over the governorship of the Falklands. One book described him as a "competent soldier". Menéndez competed with the senior representatives of the Argentine navy and air force for dominance; a competition which was formally concluded on 26 April when Menéndez appointed himself head of the Malvinas Joint Command, an action approved by the Argentine government. Two Argentine brigadier generals commanded forces in the Falklands. They were both senior to Menéndez, and treated his orders as suggestions. Menéndez opted for a strategy of attritional warfare, fighting tactically from fixed positions against any British forces that made a landing upon the Falklands, rather than a more technically complex war of manoeuvre. The plan was later criticised, but historian Duncan Anderson contended after the war that the plan "suited admirably the capabilities of the soldiers he had at his disposal".

British troops landed on the islands in May and inflicted a number of defeats upon the Argentine defenders during the course of the month. When British forces won at the Battle of Goose Green on May 29, "the gloom and despondency that gripped Menéndez and his headquarters soon infected many Argentine officers". However, in a bold move, Menéndez in late May assembled all his army, national gendarmerie and airforce special forces with a "plan to plant a north-south screen to strike at the British logistics line of communication and capture British soldiers." They were ambushed by the Special Air Service and Mountain and Arctic Warfare Cadre patrolling Mounts Kent and Simon and had a Puma helicopter shot down. Ten Argentine commandos were killed and 23 were injured or taken prisoner in the heli-borne offensive. Brigadier Julian Thompson commented:

"It was fortunate that I had ignored the views expressed by Northwood that reconnaissance of Mount Kent before insertion of 42 Commando was superfluous. Had D Squadron not been there, the Argentine Special Forces would have caught the Commando before deplaning and, in the darkness and confusion on a strange landing zone, inflicted heavy casualties on men and helicopters."

In the first week of June, as British forces prepared to assault a number of hills near Stanley, Menéndez was pressured to try to attack the Falklands settlement of Fitzroy, which had recently come under British control, but he decided to stay on the defensive. In the documentary Falklands: "How Close to Defeat? on the Discovery Channel, Brigadier Julian Thompson, the commander of 3 Commando Brigade in the Falklands acknowledged that an Argentine counterattack at this point would have

"slowed the British advance, caused heavy casualties and I think in my opinion might well forced the international opinion to lean on the British government to say you got to come to some sort of agreement".

The 5th Marine Battalion commander, Frigate Captain Carlos Hugo Robacio says in the documentary:

"I wanted to counterattack, we had a plan and the troops were ready to go. We were planning to do it at night, but the authorisation never came. The general told me in all honesty, 'I cannot support this with the logistics that we have.' I think I should've disobeyed orders and counterattacked. We were only one step away from winning the war if we had at least tried. We should've taken that last step."

After the hills were captured by the British, Menéndez considered withdrawing his forces from Stanley, and holding the main airfield, Port Stanley Airport, located on a peninsula east of the town.

A Buenos Aires based diplomat said after the British landings:

"[Menéndez] will never surrender in the Falklands unless he's satisfied that Argentina's honour will be respected. If it's at risk, he'll fight on, maybe even after his own people tell him it's time to stop."

In the final days of the fighting, Menendez visited the local hospital and in an interview aired on Argentinian television station C5N said that the sight of the wounded and the military surgeons busy at work on them, left an indelible mark on him.

On 14 June, Menéndez spoke with Lieutenant-General Leopoldo Galtieri-the President of Argentina-by radio regarding the situation. Galtieri said that Menéndez should counter-attack against the British forces with all of his soldiers, and told him that the Argentine military code stipulated that a commander should fight until he has lost 50% of his men and used 75% of his ammunition. He also added "the responsibility today is with you", which Duncan Anderson argues was the point at which Menéndez's morale finally broke. Menéndez replied, "I cannot ask more of my troops, after what they have been through...We have not been able to hold on to the heights...We have no room, we have no means, we have no support...". Anderson said that Menéndez was then psychologically isolated, and believed he had been deserted by his government, and started communicating almost gratefully with a Spanish-speaking British officer who had got in touch with him by radio. Menéndez agreed to meet with representatives of the commander of British land forces on the islands that afternoon, and Menéndez surrendered his forces in the evening. Private Milton Rhys, an Argentinian conscript of British descent who was present in the radio room, reported that soon after the conversation a mortar round landed in the back patio, knocking General Menéndez into a door and spraying the room with shrapnel.

=== Fear of massacre of civilians prompted surrender ===
According to more recent work by historian Hugh Bicheno, the end of the protracted fighting in the Tumbledown sector came about over real fear of Falklands civilians being massacred by angry Argentine troops as they hastily prepared for house-to-house combat. The Argentine ground forces commander, Brigadier-General Oscar Luis Jofre is quoted in Razor's Edge: The Unofficial History of the Falklands War as saying that as street fighting became inevitable, his Brigade Operations Officer, Lieutenant-Colonel Eugenio Dalton warned him:

"Many soldiers are in a strange state and the kelpers are bound to get hurt. One 3rd Regiment Platoon has been told to go into the houses by a fanatical lieutenant, who has ordered the men to kill the kelpers. Something awful is happening".

General Jofre is quoted as saying:

"I'll never forget that moment. It was like a lightning bolt had hit me. I was no longer in control. We've had it. The lives of the kelpers are being risked. I told General Menendez and he realised that there was no question of fighting any further. Menendez told me he wanted to talk to Galtieri to arrange a ceasefire. I agreed. It was all over".

Private Milton Rhys, an Argentine who worked as a radio operator in Government House, reported:

"He was a wise man. When the British arrived, he said: 'This cannot be, it will be a civilian as well as a military massacre.' I was there when Galtieri telephoned and said: 'You are all cowards! Jump out of your foxholes and fight!' Menéndez said: 'My general, you do not know what we are fighting here.' "

=== Military appraisal ===
In retrospect, historians Max Hastings and Simon Jenkins criticised the fact that the Argentine Army had failed to defend key features on the Falklands, interdict the British advance, or harass or counter-attack against positions that had been captured by the Royal Marines or British paratroopers, and contended that Menéndez may have lacked confidence in the ability of Argentine conscript soldiers to do these things, as well as suggesting that Menéndez was shocked by the fact that the British were determined to recapture the islands and he never recovered from this. They do argue that Menéndez's general deployment of his forces was sound, however. Other historians, notably Mark Adkin, Nick van der Bijl, David Aldea, Roberto Boila, Alejandro Corbacho and Hugh Bicheno have in more recent works reappraised the performance of the Argentine ground forces and claim their officers and NCOs generally fought well at Goose Green and that the Argentines in the form of their army and national gendarmerie special forces counterattacked the SAS on Mount Kent and harassed the British patrolling carried out in the period 1–10 June. The books 9 Battles to Stanley, 5th Infantry Brigade in the Falklands and Razor's Edge describe in great detail the Argentine counterattacks carried out at company and platoon level on the heights surrounding the Falklands capital that at times threatened to derail the British advance.

General Galtieri considered him "the best general of the Argentine army".

=== Allegations of torture of conscripts ===
Argentine army officers and NCOs were later charged with abusing and killing their own troops at Goose Green. "Our own officers were our greatest enemies", says Ernesto Alonso, the president of CECIM, an anti-Argentine military veterans group founded by Rodolfo Carrizo and other conscripts of the 7th Regiment. "They supplied themselves with whiskey from the pubs, but they weren't prepared for war. "They disappeared when things got serious." There are others who maintain that the conscripts were helped to make themselves as comfortable as possible under the circumstances and that their officers and NCOs fought well and tried hard to bolster morale.

Under Brigadier-General Mario Menéndez's express orders, the army engineers (under Colonel Manuel Dorrego) in Port Stanley constructed field showers for the troops that allowed the frontline units before the British landings to send companies into town on a rotating basis in order to get a hot shower, mend their clothes and have a proper meal in the process. Menéndez in his memoirs says that when the troops started to go hungry through lack of bread he commandeered the local bakery that largely offset the lack of bread and that there was initially an abundance of water biscuits to supplement the diet of the troops. In an interview aired on 8 June 1992 in the Graciela y Andrés television talk show, Menendez explained to hosts Graciela Alfano and Andrés Percivale and former Falklands War conscripts Jorge Altieri and Edgardo Esteban, that when a Red Cross delegation arrived in early June 1982 to find out about the well-being of the Falkland Islanders, he took advantage of their decision to stay overnight in one of the hotels, and under the cover of darkness, emptied the hospital ship of its tinned provisions and says this was the food the conscripts found in abundance in the various shipping containers in Port Stanley after the Argentinian surrender. Menendez explains in the interview that it was not poor logistics on his part but a huge cache of provisions he had built that was meant to only be distributed to the frontline troops starting on 20 June or 9 July, depending on the severity of the situation and when and if the logistics airbridge to Comodoro Rivadavia was completely severed.

His colleague, Brigadier-General Oscar Luis Jofre, after visiting the 3rd Artillery Group battery under the command of First Lieutenant Héctor Domingo Tessey in the Moody Brook area on 9 June, gave out orders that chocolate bars be handed to the troops serving in this unit. Jofre also maintains that the conscripts in the 4th Regiment survived on a daily basis on tinned meals from their US Army-type C Ration Boxes after receiving orders to abandon the Mount Kent area in late May and defend Mount Harriet and Two Sisters Mountain instead.Brigadier Julian Thompson, Commander 3 Commando Brigade, later commented on the quality and abundance of these Argentine tinned meals on Harriet and Two Sisters and how they kept his men going when supplies failed to arrive, "The Argentine rations were excellent and plentiful, as many British soldiers and Marines were to discover when they were forced to live on them in captured positions, for lack of helicopter to provide their own."

Jofre also asserts that R&R areas had been made available in the Falklands capital so that the frontline troops, regardless of rank could get a chance to get some sleep, watch television and get proper meals. Private Jorge Andreeta of the 7th Regiment, in an interview with the Argentinian Clarín newspaper in April 2012, reported that rough punishment was meted out in his unit to those caught stealing provisions, but admitted that he got a chance to shower in Port Stanley and also watch a movie in the local hospital. According Sub-Lieutenant Augusto La Madrid, an Argentine Army platoon commander that took part in the final battles, Brigadier Jofre visited under heavy shellfire visited the 6th Regiment's 'B' Company awaiting the British advance on Tumbledown Mountain and after exhorting them to fight hard gave his personal leather gloves to a conscript that was looking at them and fulfilled his promise of delivering much needed ammunition to the rifle company in the form of B/RI Mec 6.

In 2009, Argentine authorities in Comodoro Rivadavia ratified a decision made by authorities in Río Grande, Tierra del Fuego (which, according to Argentina, have authority over the islands) charging 70 officers and NCOs with inhumane treatment of conscript soldiers during the war. "We have testimony from 23 people about a soldier who was shot to death by a corporal, four other former combatants who starved to death, and at least 15 cases of conscripts who were staked out on the ground", Pablo Vassel, under-secretary of human rights in the province of Corrientes, told Inter Press Service News Agency.

On 19 May a 12th Regiment conscript, Secundino Riquelme, reportedly died of starvation. The commanding officer of the 12th Regiment, Lieutenant-Colonel Ítalo Ángel Piaggi however, maintains in his memoirs that private Riquelme died of an enlarged heart. The Regimental Medical Officer, Senior Lieutenant Juan Carlos Adjigogovich says that he and Piaggi allowed the 12th Regiment, regardless of rank, Rest and Recreation (R&R) prior to the British landings. There are claims, that false testimonies were used as evidence in accusing the Argentine officers and NCOs of abandonment of conscripts and Vassel had to step down from his post as under-secretary of human rights of Corrientes in 2010. Other veterans are sceptical about the veracity of the accusations with Colonel José Martiniano Duarte, a first lieutenant of 601 Commando Company in the Falklands War that fought against the British SAS on Many Branch Point saying that it has become "fashionable" for ex-conscripts to now accuse their superiors of abandonment. Former conscript Fernando Cangiano that served with the 10th Armoured Cavalry Squadron during the Battle for Wireless Ridge has also dismissed the claims about the "supposed widespread sadism present among the Argentine officers and NCOs" and the claim that the conscripts had not handled themselves well in the fighting. In 2007, former conscript César Trejo from A Company 3rd Regiment also accused the then head of the Argentine Ministry of Defense, Nilda Garré of promoting a "state of confused politics" in favour of the CECIM.

Sub-Lieutenant Gustavo Adolfo Malacalza of the 12th Regiment is accused of having staked three conscripts at Goose Green, for having abandoned their positions to go looking for food and revealing their positions with gunfire. "We said it was going to be us next", said Private Mario Oscar Nuñez recalling the death of conscript Riquelme. Soon after the British landings, he and two other conscripts took the decision to kill a sheep. The three men were skinning the sheep when they were discovered by Sub-Lieutenant Malacalza, who was accompanied by fellow conscripts of A Company, 12th Regiment and given a beating. "They started kicking and stamping on us. Finally came the staking." Not all the conscripts of the Goose Green garrison experienced field punishments and some even came forward to say that Sub-Lieutenant Ernesto Orlando Peluffo of the 12th Regiment, would break and share his bread. Peluffo is reported to have taken his men out of line prior to the British landings in order to allow them to have a hot shower and a good night's sleep.

Sub-Lieutenant Juan Domingo Baldini of B Company 7th Regiment has also been accused of handing out field punishment to several conscripts in his platoon for abandoning their posts to go looking for food and another conscript (Claudio Alberto Carbone) for repeatedly letting himself go to sleep while on nighttime sentry duty. When preparing the interviews for his book, Vincent Bramley, a machine-gunner with 3 Para in the Falklands, reached the conclusion that the Argentine officers on Mount Longdon showed little or no concern for their men. Private Claudio Carbone said: "Lieutenant Baldini never said anything to us − we just followed him up the hills. It was like living in hell on that hill. Corporal Rios was the worst. Like most of the other corporals, he was a lazy bastard. None of our superiors showed the slightest concern for us." However, Private Fabian Pássaro has defended the platoon commander's conduct saying: "But the officer that was with us, second lieutenant Baldini, he worried a lot about it. One day he said the way things were going it was impossible, that this could not be, and he sent for provisions from down below. And what is more, he allowed us to supplement the little we got with sheep. Baldini did what he could, but he could not do everything, poor guy. Baldini is reported to have served a cup of hot chocolate milk to each conscript in his platoon on 25 May (Argentina's Independence Day) an act of kindness that Private Carbone remembers but does not go into specifics. In an interview in 2023 with former Argentine war correspondent Nicolás Kasanzew, Vicente José Bruno who as a Ranger-trained Private 1st Class served as machine-gunner under Sub-Lieutenant Baldini also defended the conduct of his platoon commander.

Although the threat of field punishment kept the majority of the soldiers in line, in the predawn darkness of 9 June 1982, four conscripts of the 7th Regiment's 'A' Company on Wireless Ridge, Privates Carlos Alberto Hornos, Pedro Vojkovic, Alejandro Vargas y Manuel Zelarrayán abandoned their posts under the cover of darkness, and using a wooden boat they planned to confiscate the goods reported to be inside a shepherd's house in Murrell Farm. Unfortunately for the four involved, their boat hit an anti-tank mine when returning from their foray killing them on the shoreline. During a 2012 interview, Menéndez dismissed all claims of torture as "an exaggeration", claiming that the reported field punishment cases were not an illegal practice and that these abided with the Argentine military code in 1982. In 2007, the Argentine Minister of Defence Nilda Garré had herself gone on record saying the field punishments were acceptable in the case there were no military lock ups and concluded: It is a cruelty and it comes from inexplicable sadism, but it's true that it was within the rules. In a 2019 interview with 'Radio Noticias', former Private Gustavo Alberto Placente that served with the 181st Military Police Company in Port Stanley, explained that field punishments were indeed carried out but were absolutely necessary to keep the frontline soldiers in line.

== Later life and death ==
Within a month after the surrender, Menéndez had been removed from his positions of power. According to Menéndez's mother, Hilda Villarino de Menéndez, her son was arrested in October 1983 by the Argentine Army, and sent to a base for 60 days of disciplinary detention. She said that the arrest had "apparently something to do" with a book her son had published, which covered his experiences during the war. In 2009, Menéndez claimed that the oft-quoted figure of 30,000 disappeared people during the 1976-1983 Argentine military dictatorship was an "invented number" and lambasted former Army Chief, Lieutenant-General Martín Antonio Balza for supporting the figure. Menendez also criticized Balza for not owning up to his role in the Dirty War and for portraying Argentine officers in his book Malvinas: Gesta e Incompetencia (Editorial Atlántida, 2003) as "idiots or pusillanimous." On 18 October 2012 he was again arrested, along with another 16 people, and indicted for his role in human rights violations during Operativo Independencia in 1975. Menendez served as second-in-command of the 5th Infantry Brigade, first under Brigadier-General Acdel Vilas and latter under Brigadier-General Antonio Domingo Bussi, who commanded the various units sent to fight the ERP guerrillas in Tucumán province with orders to also detain their active collaborators hidden among the civilian population.

Menéndez died in Buenos Aires on 18 September 2015, two weeks after having been admitted to hospital. In 2019 it was reported that Menéndez's ashes had been secretly scattered on the Falkland Islands in December 2015 without the consent of the Falkland Islands government.

== See also ==
- Luciano Benjamín Menéndez

== Sources ==
- Anderson, Duncan (2002). The Falklands War 1982. Oxford: Osprey Publishing. ISBN 1-84176-422-1 – via Google Books.
- Hastings, Max; Simon Jenkins (1997). The Battle for the Falklands. London: Pan Books. ISBN 0-330-35284-9.
