= Argentine surrender in the Falklands War =

Surrender of Argentina in the Falklands War

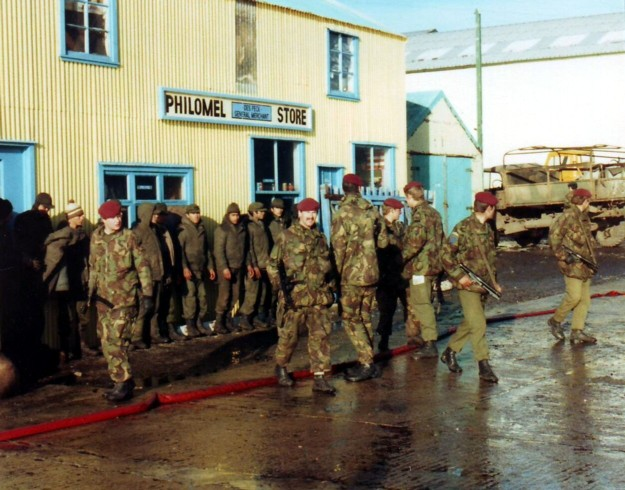
Argentine prisoners being guarded by the 2nd Battalion, Parachute Regiment. (maroon berets)

The last stage of the Falklands War was the surrender of the Argentine Governor at Port Stanley.

== Surrender ==
At 21:00 on 14 June 1982, the commander of the Argentine garrison in Stanley, General Mario Menéndez, surrendered to Major General Jeremy Moore. The surrender was contrary to the Argentine Army code stating that a surrender should not happen unless more than 50% of the men were casualties and 75% of the ammunition was spent.

The terms of the surrender document were slightly changed after negotiation by General Menéndez. The phrase unconditional surrender was changed for the term surrender. The Argentines were granted:

- The Argentine units will retain their flags.
- The units will remain under control of their respective officers
- The surrender ceremony will be private (not public)
- The Argentine officers will retain their sidearms.

However, the final point about the returning of the 11,313 prisoners of war in their own ships was not accepted by the British and instead they would be transported by the British. 4,167 of them were repatriated to Argentina on the ocean liner Canberra alone. The junta had incorrectly stated that the liner had been crippled during the Battle of San Carlos.

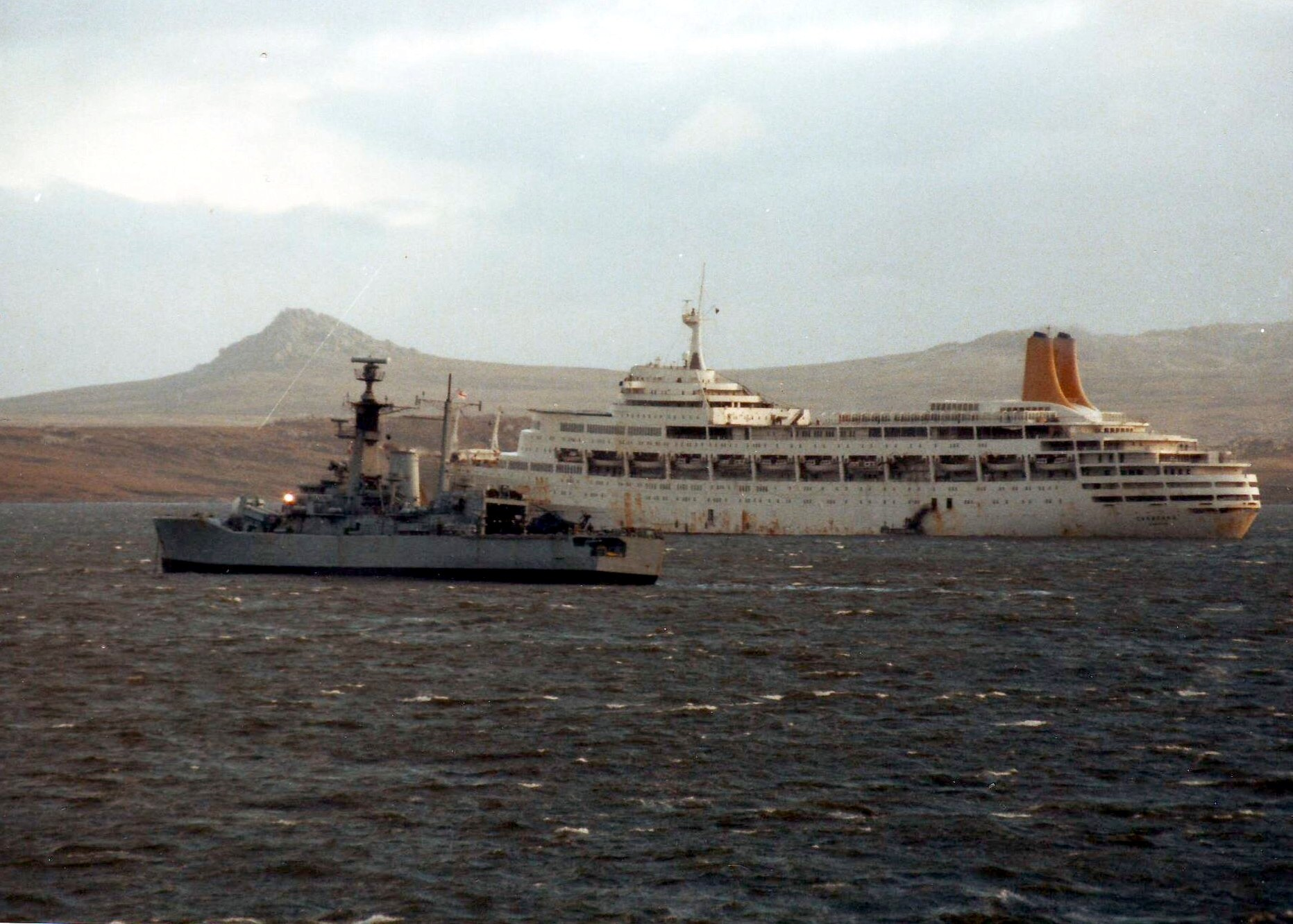
HMS Andromeda and SS Canberra off Port Stanley on 16 June 1982

== Surrender document ==
Present at the signing of the letter of surrender were:

- Captain Melbourne Hussey, Argentine Navy Translator
- General de Brigada Mario Menéndez Argentine Army
- Vicecomodoro Carlos Bloomer-Reeve, Argentine Air Force
- Vicecommodore Eugenio J Miari, Argentine Air Force, Senior Argentine legal advisor
- Captain Rod Bell, Royal Marines Translator
- Lieutenant-Colonel Geoff Field, Royal Engineers
- Colonel Brian Pennicott, Royal Artillery
- Major General Jeremy Moore, Royal Marines
- Colonel Mike Rose, Special Air Service
- Colonel Tom Seccombe, Royal Marines
- Staff Sergeant Glenn Harwood Royal Signals

The letter of surrender read:

Headquarters, Land Forces

Falkland Islands

INSTRUMENT OF SURRENDER
I, the undersigned, Commander of all the Argentine land, sea and air forces in the Falkland Islands [Menéndez's signature, scribbled over the crossed-out word of "unconditionally"] surrender to Major General J.J. MOORE CB OBE MC* as representative of Her Britannic Majesty's Government.

Under the terms of this surrender all Argentine personnel in the Falkland Islands are to muster at assembly points which will be nominated by General Moore and hand over their arms, ammunition, and all other weapons and warlike equipment as directed by General Moore or appropriate British officers acting on his behalf.

Following the surrender all personnel of the Argentinian Forces will be treated with honour in accordance with the conditions set out in the Geneva Convention of 1949. They will obey any directions concerning movement and in connection with accommodation.

This surrender is to be effective from 2359 hours ZULU on 14 June (2059 hours local) and includes those Argentine Forces presently deployed in and around Port Stanley, those others on East Falkland, [Menéndez's signature, scribbled over the crossed-out word of "Lafonia"] West Falkland and all outlying islands.

[Menéndez's signature] Commander Argentine Forces
[Moore's signature] J. J. MOORE Major General
[Pennicott's signature] Witness

2359 hours 14 June 1982

== Captured Argentine equipment ==
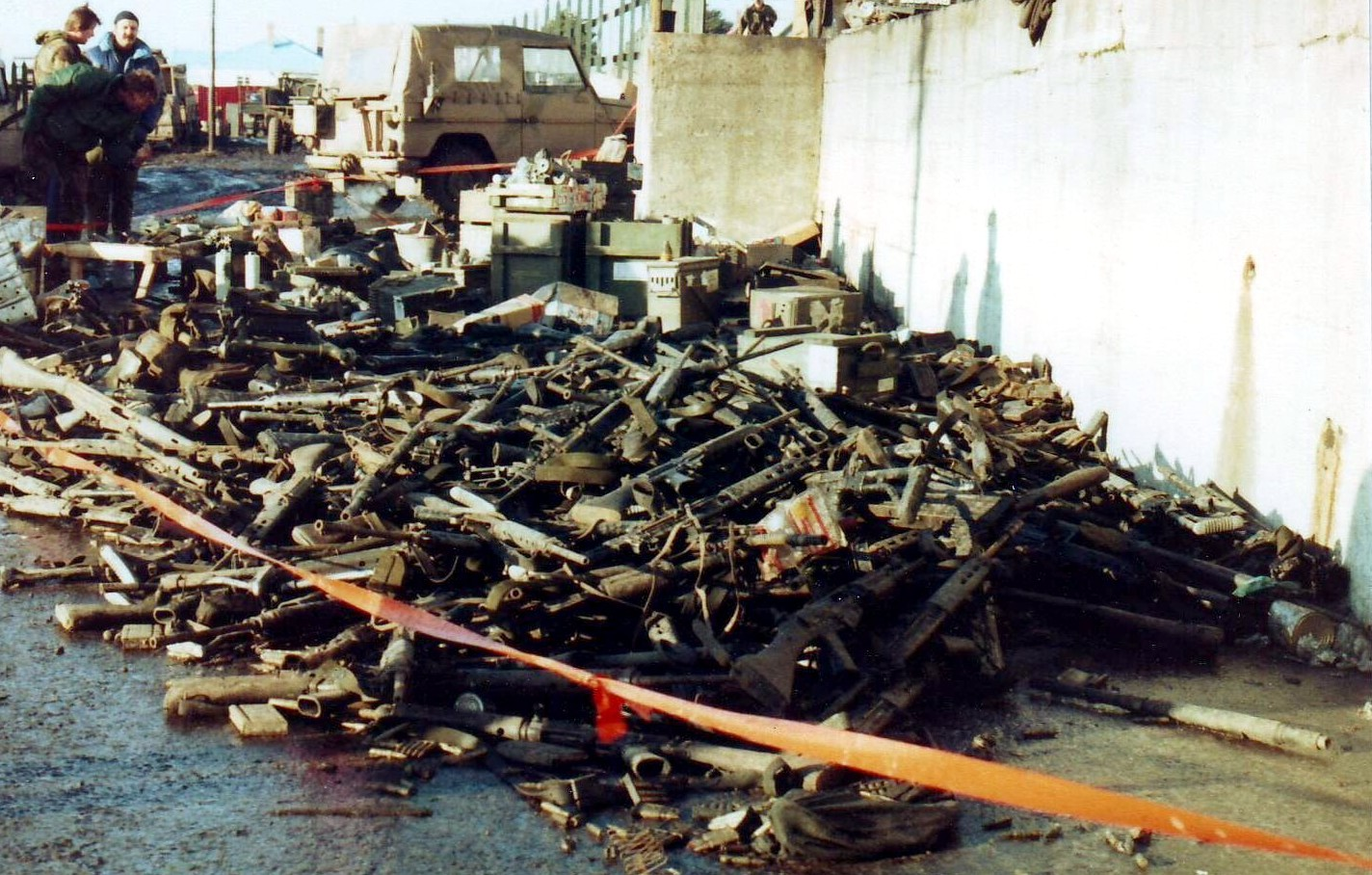
A pile of discarded Argentine weapons in Port Stanley.

Quantities are approximates:

- 100 Mercedes-Benz MB 1112/13/14 trucks
- 20 Unimogs
- 50 Mercedes-Benz G-Class 4x4s
- 12 Panhard AML 90 mm vehicles
- 1 SAM Roland launcher
- 7 SAM Tigercats launchers
- 1 Improvised Exocet launcher
- 3 CITER 155mm L33 Guns
- >10 Oto Melara 105 mm cannons
- >15 Oerlikon twins 35 mm and 15 Rheinmetall twin 20 mm air defence cannons and 20 Hispano Suiza 30 mm single barrel guns.
- 1 AN/TPS-43 3D mobile air search radar
- 1 AN/TPS-44 mobile air search radar
- >5 Skyguard FC radars plus (1 damaged in missile strike), 1 Super Fledermaus FC radar and several RASIT fire control radars
- Blowpipe Manpads
- SAM-7 Manpads (bought in late May from Gaddafi's Libya)
- 14 flyable helicopters (2 Agusta A109, 2 Bell 212, 8 UH-1H, 1 Chinook and 1 Puma)
- >10 FMA IA 58 Pucará
- 1 Aermacchi MB-339
- Argentine Coast Guard patrol boat GC82 Islas Malvinas - renamed HMS Tiger Bay
- >11,000 personal weapons
- >4 million 7.62 munition rounds (10,500 from Goose Green)
- >11,000 105mm ammunition rounds

Some of the equipment was rendered useless by Argentine personnel before the surrender.

The Argentine Rattenbach commission (Spanish: Informe Rattenbach) was assembled after the war to investigate the causes of defeat. It recommended serious penalties for some of the officers in charge, but its influence on the later trial was practically nil.

== Aftermath ==
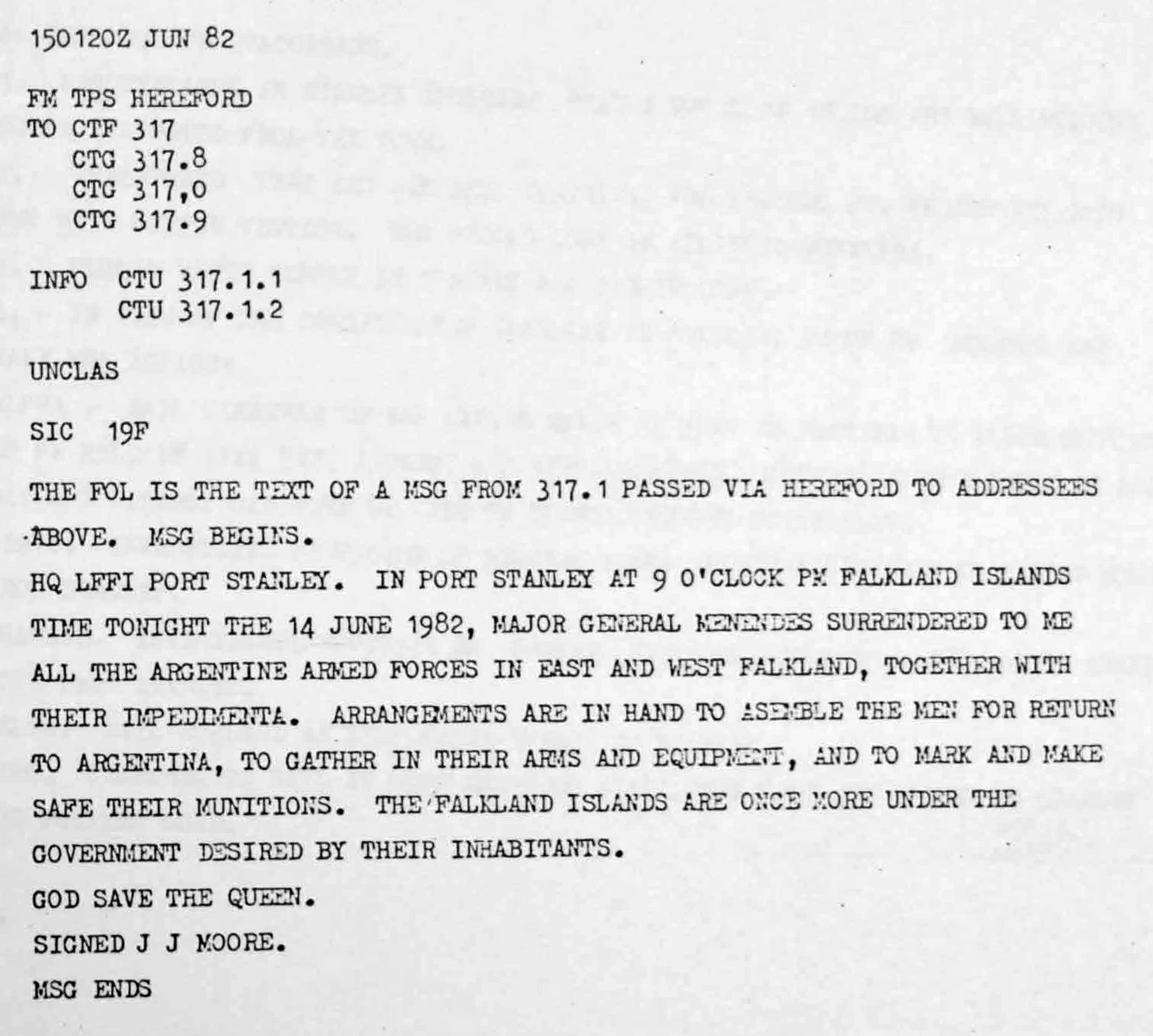
Telegram from General Moore reporting the Argentine surrender.

On 20 June, the British retook the South Sandwich Islands and declared hostilities to be over after removing Argentina's Southern Thule garrison at the Corbeta Uruguay base. Corbeta Uruguay was established in 1976, but the Argentine base was only contested through diplomatic channels by the UK until 1982.

The war lasted 74 days, with 255 British and 649 Argentine soldiers, marines, sailors, and airmen, and three civilian Falklanders killed.

The British Government decreed that all classified information would be available to the public in the year 2082. However, following the Freedom of Information Act, a great deal of formerly classified material is now available.

The surrender document is on display at the Imperial War Museum in London. As noted in the museum, the time of surrender was backdated three hours in order that both Zulu time (UTC) and the local time were recorded as 14 June even though technically it was already 15 June in London, in order to prevent possible confusion by Argentine troops who might have mistakenly thought that they were permitted to keep fighting until the next day, 15 June 1982.

Relations between the UK and Argentina were not restored until 1989 and then only under the umbrella formula which states that the islands sovereignty dispute will remain aside.

Since 1984 in the Falkland Islands, 14 June has been a public holiday called "Liberation Day". It is marked by a remembrance ceremony in Stanley.
