= Falklands War order of battle: Argentine ground forces =

This is a list of the ground forces from Argentina that took part in the Falklands War (Spanish: Guerra de las Malvinas). For a list of ground forces from the United Kingdom, see Falklands War order of battle: British ground forces.

== Operation Rosario (April 2) ==
- Amphibious Task Group 40.1 - Rear Admiral of the Marines Carlos Büsser
  - Amphibious Commandos Group, on board the destroyer Santisima Trinidad landed at Mullet Creek south of Stanley, in inflatable boats
    - 84 men (†one) ^{dubious, more likely 50, too many for a type 42 destroyer plus crew} Lieutenant-Commander Sánchez Sabarots.
  - Buzos Tácticos, on board the submarine ARA Santa Fe, swam ashore.
    - 15 frogmen Lieutenant-Commander Alfredo R. Cufré.
  - 2nd Marine Infantry Btn. (BIM 2),
    - embarked on LST ARA Cabo San Antonio (Q42), they landed in 20 LVTP-7 amphibious, armoured, tracked and five LARC-V wheeled vehicles
    - and ARA Almirante Irízar (Q-5), inserted on Stanley airport by SH-3 Sea King helicopters
      - 500 men
  - A 25th Infantry Regiment Company (Argentine Army) airlifted by C-130

== South Georgia (April 3) ==
- 1st Marine Infantry Btn. (BIM 1) (†two), embarked ARA Bahia Paraiso transport and ARA Guerrico corvette Lieutenant Guillermo J. Luna.
  - 60 men
- Buzos Tácticos, on board the ship ARA Bahía Paraíso.
  - 14 frogmen Commander Alfredo Astiz.

== Theatre of Operations in the Falkland Islands (April 7 – June 14) ==
Guarnición Militar Malvinas

- Commander: Brigade General Mario Menéndez (governor). RI (Infantry Regiments) were about 800 men.

=== 3rd (Jungle) Infantry Brigade ===
Commander: Brigade General Omar Parada. Brigade home base: Mesopotamia

- 4th Regiment (RI 4) — Mount Harriet and Two Sisters (Stanley) (†23 and 121 wounded)
  - Commander: Lieutenant-Colonel Diego Alejandro Soria.
- 12th Regiment (RI 12) — Goose Green and Darwin (East Falkland) (†35 and 72 wounded)
  - Commander: Lieutenant-Colonel Italo A. Piaggi.
- West Falkland
  - 5th Regiment (RI 5) — Port Howard (†8 and 67 wounded)
    - Commander: Colonel Juan Ramón Mabragaña
  - 8th Regiment, 9th Infantry Brigade (RI 8) — Fox Bay (†5 and 51 wounded)
    - Commander: Lieutenant-Colonel Ernesto Alejandro Repossi.

=== 10th Mechanised Infantry Brigade ===
Agrupación Puerto Argentino (Stanley Sector) Commander: Brigadier-General Oscar Luis Jofre. Brigade home base: Buenos Aires Province

- 3rd Regiment (RI 3) — Stanley - aborted urban warfare (†five and 85 wounded)
  - Commander: Lieutenant-Colonel David Ubaldo Comini.
- 6th Regiment (RI 6) — Stanley Common (†12 and 35 wounded)
  - Commander: Lieutenant-Colonel Jorge Halperin.
- 7th Regiment (RI 7) — Mount Longdon and Wireless Ridge (Stanley) (†36 and 152 wounded)
  - Commander: Lieutenant-Colonel Omar Giménez.
- 25th Infantry Regiment (Argentina) (RI 25), 9th Infantry Brigade (attach to 10th Brigade) — Stanley Airport, Goose Green and San Carlos (†13 and 67 wounded)
  - Commander: Lieutenant-Colonel Mohamed Ali Seineldin.
- Panhard Armoured Cars Squadron (Esc Panhard/Destacamento de Exploración de Caballería Blindada 181), 9th Infantry Brigade (attached to 10th Infantry Brigade) - Moody Brook
  - Commander: Major Alejandro David Carullo.
  - 12×Panhard Armoured Car 90 mm.
- 10th Armoured Cavalry Reconnaissance Squadron (dismounted), 10th Infantry Brigade (attached to reserve) - Moody Brook (†six and 68 wounded)
  - Commander: Captain Rodrigo Alejandro Soloaga.

=== Artillery ===
- 3rd Artillery Group (GA 3), 3rd Infantry Brigade (†two and 21 wounded)
  - Commander: Lieutenant-Colonel Martín A. Balza
  - 18 OTO Melara Mod 56 105 mm field guns (Stanley and Goose Green).
  - 2 x CITER 155mm L33 Guns airlifted from May 15 (from the 101st Artillery Group) (Stanley).
- 4th Airborne Artillery Group (GA Aerot 4), 4th Airborne Brigade (†3 and 42 wounded) (Stanley).
  - Commander: Lieutenant-Colonel Carlos Alberto Quevedo
  - 18 x 105 mm guns.

=== Miscellaneous Army Units ===
I Corps

- 181st Military Police and Intelligence Coy (Stanley).

Army Chief of Staff Troops

- 601st Engineer battalion (BI-601) (†one and 10 wounded) (Fitz Roy bridge demolition)
  - Commander: Major Jorge Luis Amaro Etienot.
  - 9th Engineer company
    - Commander: Major Oscar Minorini Lima.
  - 10th Engineer company (†one and five wounded)
    - Commander: Major Carlos Roberto Matalon.
- 601 Commando Company Port Howard and Murrell River
  - Commander: Major Mario Castagneto
- 602nd Commando Company Mount Kent and Murrell River(†five and seven wounded)
  - Commander: Major Aldo Rico.
- 601 Combat Aviation Battalion (Batallón de Aviación de Combate 601) See 601 Assault Helicopter Battalion

=== 'Reserva Z' ===
Reserva Z (Z Reserve) was established on 7 April 1982. Initially comprising Major Alejandro Carullo's 181st Armoured Cavalry Squadron, it was located on Stanley Racecourse with orders to reinforce Fox Bay or Goose Green if required via helicopters or ships.

- 181st Armoured Car Squadron (Stanley Racecourse).
- 10th Armoured Squadron (Moody Valley).
- 6th Regiment's 'Piribebuy' Company (The Saddle).
  - Commander: First Lieutenant Raúl Daniel Abella.
- 3rd Regiment's 'Tacuari' Company
  - Commander: Captain Rubén Oscar Zunino.

=== Marines ===
- 5th Marine Infantry Btn. (BIM 5) attached to Army — Mount Tumbledown, Mount William and Sapper Hill (Stanley) (†16 and 68 wounded)
  - Commander: Capitan de Fragata (commander) Carlos Hugo Robacio.
- Heavy Machine-Gun Company; 27 x 12.7 mm MGs
  - Commander: Teniente de Navio (Marine Captain) Sergio Alejandro Dachary. Stanley Common (†seven and 17 wounded)
- Amphibious Engineer Company Stanley Common (†four)
  - Commander: Capitan de Corbeta Luis Aristides Menghini
- 1st Marine Field Artillery Battalion's B Battery (Batería B/BlAC) Stanley Common (†two and two wounded)
- Commander: Teniente de Navio Mario Rubén Abadal
  - 1,800 men
- Dog platoon Naval Base Puerto Belgrano Teniente de fragata Miguel A. Paz
  - 18 dogs (†two), 22 men

=== Gendarmería (Border Guards) ===
Escuadrón de Fuerzas Especiales 601 de Gendarmería Nacional The following Gendarmeria combat patrols in the form of the 601st National Gendarmerie Special Forces Squadron operated in the Falklands:

- Special Forces Combat Patrols: (†seven) _{6 died and 11 injured in the Puma helicopter crash on 30 May}
  - Atucha Squad - Mount Kent (East Falkland).
  - Bariloche Squad.
  - Calafate Squad.
  - Esquel Squad - Smoko Mount (East Falkland).

=== Air defences ===
==== Army ====
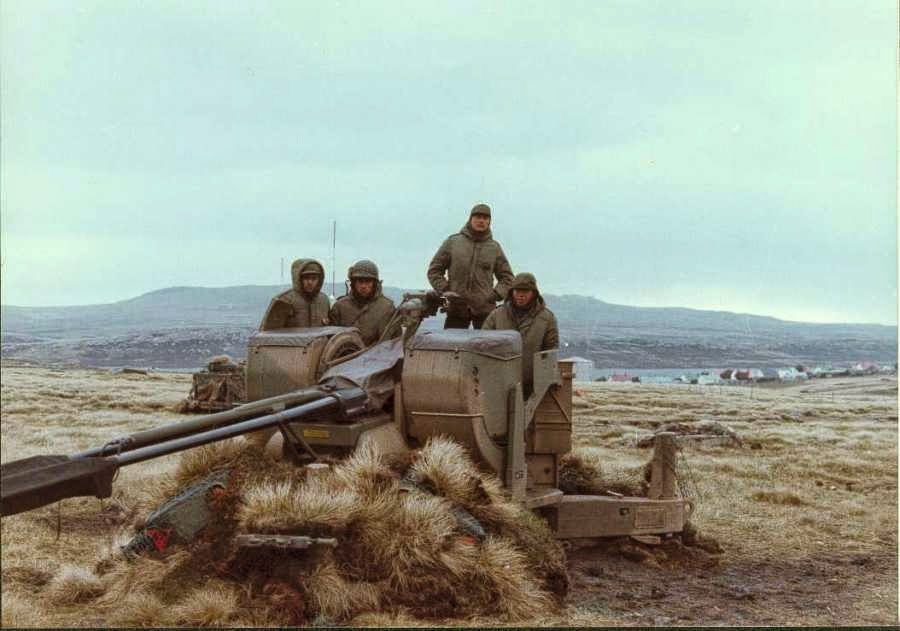
An Argentine crew-served Oerlikon GDF anti-aircraft artillery piece during the war

- 601st Air Defence Artillery Group (GADA-601). (†six and 23 wounded) _{4 by Shrike 3rd June}
  - Commander: Lieutenant-Colonel Héctor L. Arias
  - Cardion AN/TPS-44 long range radar
  - Roland SAM system
  - 4 x Tigercat SAM triple launchers
  - 6 x Skyguard fire control radars, each controlling 2 Oerlikon GDF-002 35 mm twin cannons. (One Skyguard radar and two GDF-002 35 mm twin cannons deployed to BAM Cóndor/Goose Green.)
  - 12 x GDF-002 35 mm twin cannons for the Argentine Army. 3 x GDF-002 35 mm twin cannons for the (FAA) Air Force. The FAA Oerlikon GDF-002 guns were sited on the Southwest side of Port Stanley Airport.
  - 3 x Oerlikon 20 mm single barrel Anti-Aircraft Cannons.
- B Battery, 101st Anti-Aircraft group (GADA 101), I Corps.(†three and nine wounded)
  - Commander: Major Jorge Monge.
  - 8 x Hispano Suiza 30 mm guns.
  - 10 x 12.7 mm machine guns.
- Some Infantry units
  - Blowpipe shoulder fired SAMs.

==== Air Force ====
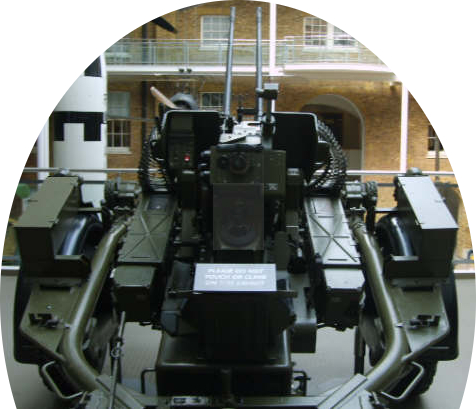
A captured Air Force Rheinmetall 20 mm Twin Anti-Aircraft Cannon from Goose Green in the Imperial War Museum

- Stanley Airfield defence group
- Goose Green Airfield defence group (BAM Cóndor)
- Special Operations Group:
  - Westinghouse TPS-43F long range radar
  - 3 x Oerlikon twin 35 mm guns
  - Super Fledermaus fire control radar
  - Elta short ranged radar at Goose Green
  - 15 x Rheinmetall Rh-202 twin 20 mm anti-aircraft guns (9 deployed to defend Port Stanley Airbase, 6 deployed to defend Goose Green Airbase)
  - A number of SA-7 man portable short ranged SAMs.

==== Navy ====
- 1st Marine Anti-Aircraft Battalion Stanley Common (†2).
  - Commander: capitan de corbeta (Marine Major) Hector E. Silva .
  - 3 x Tigercat SAM triple launchers
  - 12 x Hispano HS-831 30 mm anti-aircraft guns

== Infantry weapons ==
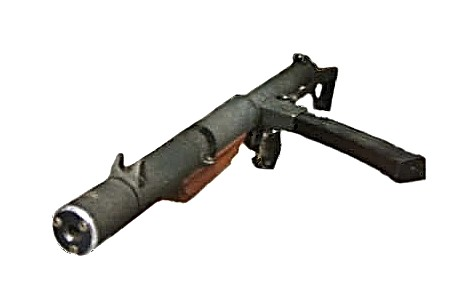
A silenced Sterling submachine gun, used by commandos in Operation Rosario

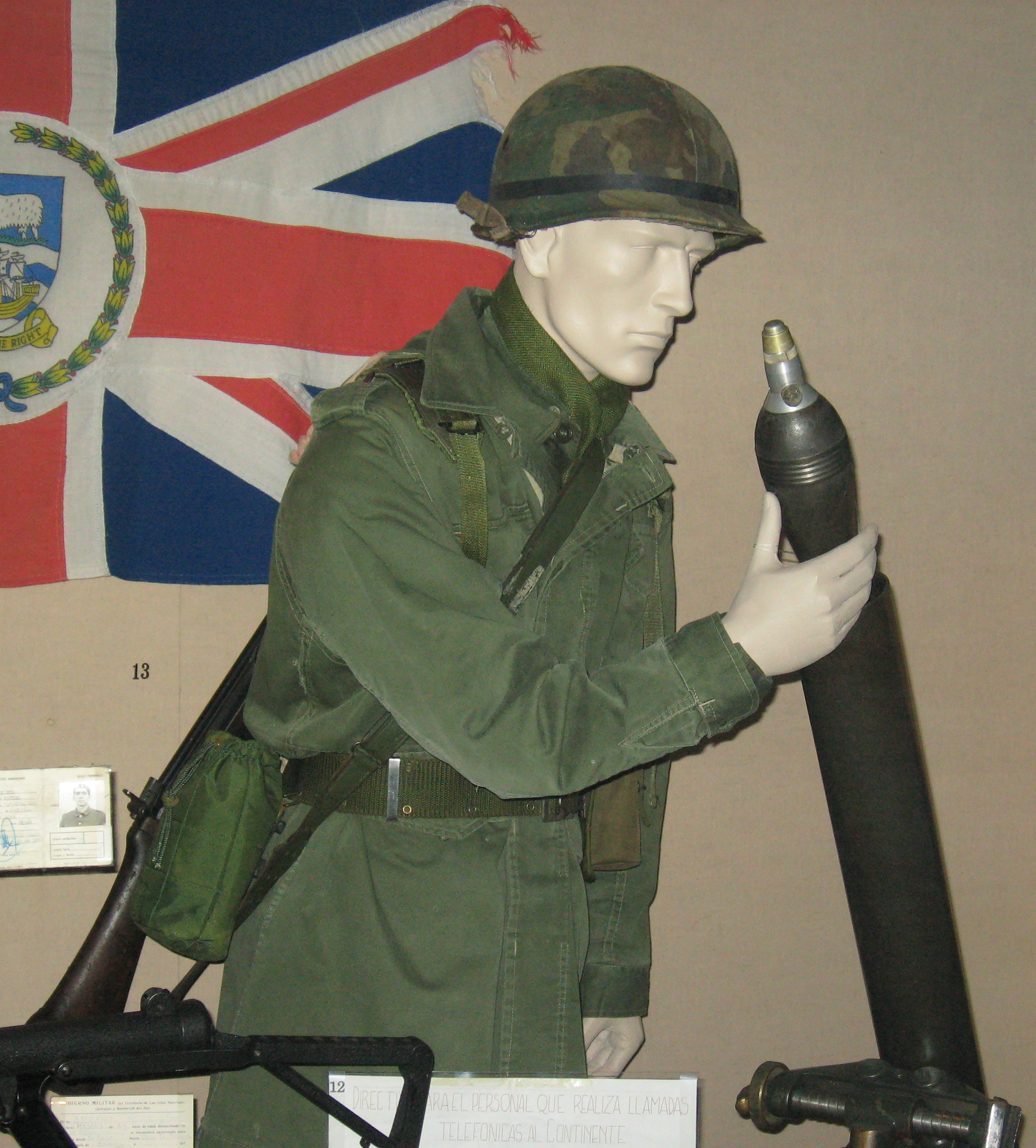
A display in the Imperial War Museum, showing an Argentine mortar

- Personal Weapons
  - Browning Hi-Power
  - Ballester–Molina
  - FM PA3-DM
  - FMK-3 submachine gun
  - L34A1 Sterling
  - FM FAL 50.61
  - FM FAL 50.41
  - M16A1, "partially used"
- Support Weapons
  - FM FAP
  - FM MAG
  - Browning M2HB
  - 90mm M20 Bazooka
  - FM 60 mm Mortar
  - FM 81 mm Mortar
  - FM 120 mm Mortar
  - FM Model 1968/M-1974 105mm recoilless gun
  - Blowpipe MANPADS (Man Portable Air-Defence System)
- Anti-personnel mines
  - FMK1 (mine)
  - No. 4
  - P4B
  - SB33
- Anti-tank mines
  - C3B
  - FMK3
  - M1
  - No. 6
  - SB81

== Casualties ==
- Argentine Army: 194 (16 officers, 35 NCOs and 143 conscripts) killed and 1,308 wounded
  - list Argentine Army casualties
- Argentine Navy : 34 Marines killed (one officer, three NCOs and 30 conscripts) and 105 wounded
- Gendarmería Nacional Argentina: seven commandos (two officers, four NCOs and one gendarme) killed and 12 wounded or injured.

== Military appraisal ==
In the immediate post-war years, British military historians like Max Hastings and Simon Jenkins in their book Battle for the Falklands (Norton & Co., 1983) criticized the Argentine Army and supporting Marine Corps for having failed to defend Mount Kent in the Falklands, counter the British night-fighting patrols, or harass or counter-attack against positions that had been captured by the Royal Marines or British Paratroopers, and contended that Brigadier-General Mario Menéndez may have lacked confidence in the ability of Argentine conscript soldiers to do these things, as well as suggesting that Menéndez was shocked by the fact that the British were determined to recapture the islands and he never recovered from this. They do argue that Menéndez's general deployment of his forces was sound.

Other historians, notably Mark Adkin, Nick van der Bijl, Roberto Boila, Alejandro Corbacho and Hugh Bicheno have in more recent works reappraised the performance of the Argentine ground forces and claim their officers and NCOs generally fought well at Goose Green and elsewhereand that the Argentines in the form of their army and national gendarmerie special forces counterattacked the SAS on Mount Kent and harassed the British patrolling carried out in the period 1–10 June. The books 9 Battles to Stanley, 2003), 5th Infantry Brigade in the Falklands and Razor's Edge describe in great detail the Argentine counterattacks carried out at company and platoon level on the heights surrounding the Falklands capital that at times threatened to derail the British advance.

== See also ==
- Falklands War order of battle: Argentine air forces
- Falklands War order of battle: Argentine naval forces
