= Michael Scott (British Army officer) =

British Army officer (born 1941)

Major-General Michael Scott CB CBE DSO
- Born: 3 March 1941 (age 85)
- Military career
- Allegiance: United Kingdom
- Branch: British Army
- Service years: 1960–1997
- Rank: Major-General
- Service number: 463067
- Unit: Scots Guards
- Commands: 2nd Battalion, Scots Guards; 8th Infantry Brigade; Scottish Command
- Conflicts: The Troubles; Falklands War: Battle of Mount Tumbledown
- Awards: Companion of the Order of the Bath; Commander of the Order of the British Empire; Distinguished Service Order

Major-General Michael Ian Eldon Scott, CB, CBE, DSO (born 3 March 1941) is a retired British Army officer who took part in the Falklands War, and held the office of the Military Secretary of the British Army. In post-military life he was the Bar Council's Complaints Commissioner, and has published several books of history.

== Early life ==
The only son of Lt. Col. Eric Surtees Scott, and Great-Grandson of John Scott, the 3rd Earl of Eldon, Scott received his formal education at Bradfield College in Berkshire, and the Royal Military Academy Sandhurst. He received a commission into the Scots Guards Regiment in 1960.

== Military career ==
In 1965 he was made an equerry to the Duke of Gloucester. In 1966 he was appointed Adjutant of the 2nd Battalion Scots Guards, before in 1968 becoming Aide-de-Camp to Earl Cathcart.

In early 1981 he was appointed the commanding officer of the 2nd Battalion of the Scots Guards.

After the invasion of the Falkland Islands by Argentina in early April 1982, in mid-June 1982 Scott commanded the victorious attack of the 2nd Battalion of the Scots Guards and supporting units at the Battle of Mount Tumbledown against positions held by the Argentinian Marines' 5th Naval Infantry Battalion, which cleared the way to Port Stanley and ended the war. At the conclusion of the campaign he was awarded the Distinguished Service Order.

From 1984 to 1986 he commanded the 8th Infantry Brigade in Northern Ireland during Operation Banner.

In 1988 he became Deputy Military Secretary. In 1993 he was made General Officer Commanding Scotland and was Governor of Edinburgh Castle. From 1995 to 1997 he was the British Army's Military Secretary.

== Post-military life ==
On retiring from the British Army after thirty seven years in 1997, Scott was the first lay Complaints Commissioner of the General Council of the Bar, and has published several books on eclectic subject matter, ranging from British Imperial military history, Victorian high society scandals (the Royal baccarat scandal of 1890), and his experiences in Bar Council's Complaints Commission.

== Publications ==
- In Love & War, the Lives of General Harry and Lady Smith (2008).
- Scapegoats: Thirteen victims of Military Injustice (2013).
- Surrender at New Orleans: General Sir Harry Smith in the Peninsula and America (2014).
- Royal Betrayal: The Great Baccarat Scandal of 1890. (2017).
- The Lady of Kabul (2019).
- Minding the Law: The hazardous and hilarious world of handling complaints against barristers (2023).

Military offices
| Preceded by Sir Peter Graham | GOC Scotland; 1993–1995 | Succeeded by Jonathan Hall |
| Preceded by Sir Robert Hayman-Joyce | Military Secretary; 1995–1997 | Succeeded by David Burden |
