= Battle of Mount Tumbledown =

1982 Falklands War

Coordinates: 51°41′47″S 57°58′3″W

- Part of the Falklands War
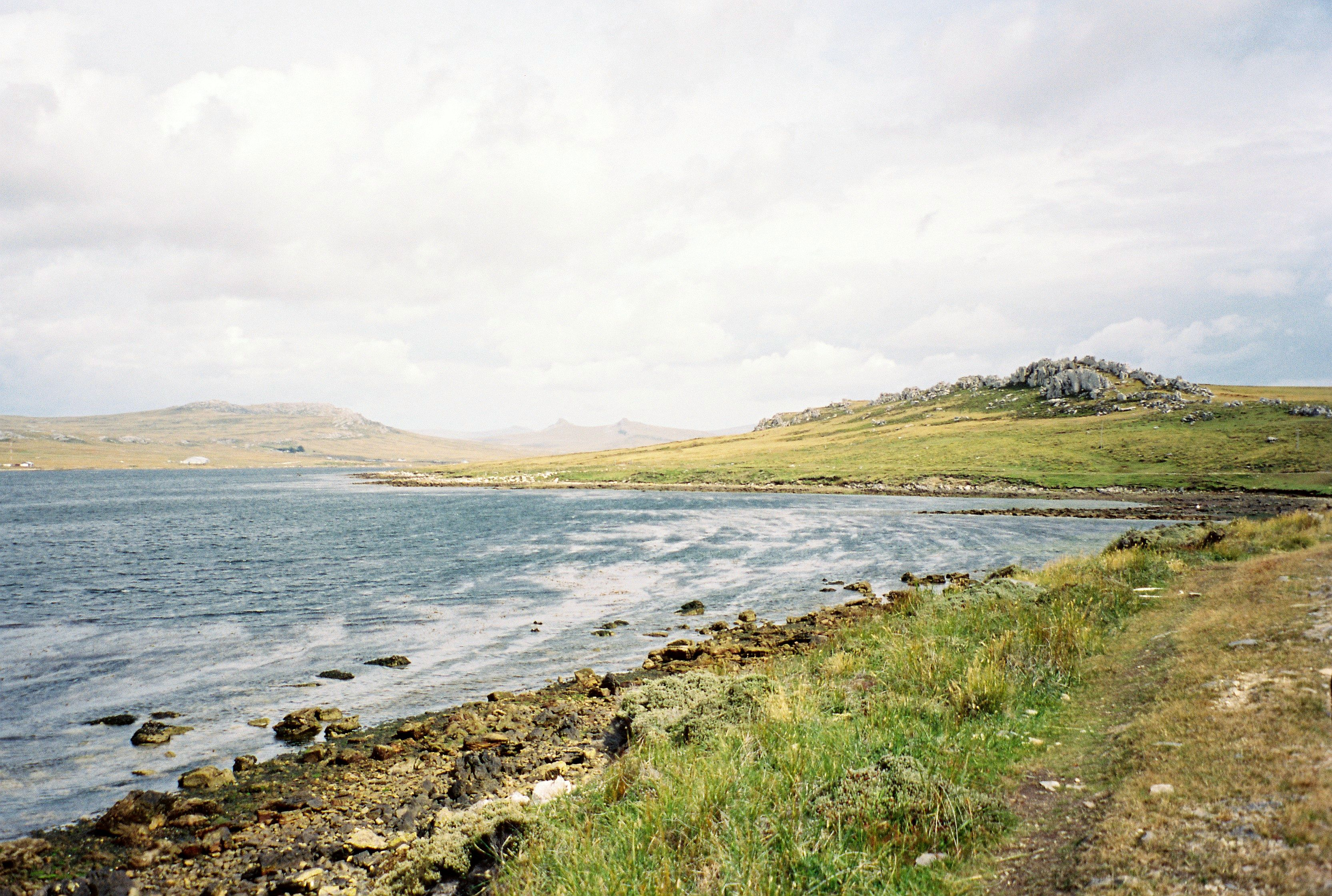
- Mount Tumbledown, Two Sisters, and Wireless Ridge, as seen from Stanley Harbour.
Date	13–14 June 1982
Location	Mount Tumbledown, Falkland Islands
Result	British victory

Belligerents
United Kingdom	Argentina

Commanders and leaders
Michael Scott; John Kiszely; Iain Dalzel-Job	Carlos Robacio

Units involved
5th Infantry Brigade: Scots Guards; 7th Gurkha Rifles; Welsh Guards; 3 Commando Brigade: 42 Commando; Blues and Royals; Royal Navy	5th Naval Infantry Battalion; 1st Marine Field Artillery Battalion; 1st Marine Anti-Aircraft Regiment; 4th Infantry Regiment; 12th Infantry Regiment

Strength
641 soldiers 2 Scorpion light tanks 2 Scimitar light tanks 2 frigates	700 marines 200 soldiers 3 Tigercat SAMs

Casualties and losses
10 killed 9 Guardsmen and 1 RE Sapper c60 wounded - 43 Guardsmen, 8 Gurkhas, 6 Royal Marines and 3 tank crewmen 1 tank disabled 1 snowmobile disabled	30 killed 100 wounded 30 captured

Mount Tumbledown, Mount William, and Sapper Hill are located to the west of Port Stanley, the capital of the Falkland Islands. Due to their proximity to the capital, these positions held strategic importance during the 1982 Falklands War. On the night of 13–14 June, British forces launched an offensive against Mount Tumbledown and the surrounding high ground. The operation was successful, forcing the retreat of the Argentine force. This engagement, one of several night battles during the British advance toward Stanley, allowed British troops to secure a dominant position over the town, leading to the fall of Stanley and the surrender of Argentine forces on the islands.

British forces were the 2nd Battalion, Scots Guards, 42 Commandos Mortars and four light tanks of the Blues and Royals. The 7th Gurkha Rifles were in reserve with the task of capturing Mount William, allowing the Welsh Guards through to take Sapper Hill. The attack was supported by gunfire from HMS Active.

The Argentinian forces defending the mountains around Port Stanley were Commander Carlos Hugo Robacio's 5th Marine Infantry Battalion (BIM 5), a reinforced, cold-weather-trained and equipped Marine battalion. Prior to the British landings, the Argentine Marines battalion had been brought up to brigade strength by a company of the Amphibious Engineers Company, a heavy machine-gun company of the Headquarters Battalion, half a battery comprising three Tigercat SAM launchers of the 1st Marine Field Artillery Battalion (Batallón de Artillería de Campaña N.º 1 or BIAC), two anti-aircraft batteries comprising 12 Hispano-Suiz, HS-831 30mm AA guns of the 1st Marine Anti-Aircraft Regiment (Batallón Antiaéreo or BIAA), a 2nd (under Lieutenant Alfredo José Imboden) Marine Infantry Battalion platoon and a 3rd (under Second Lieutenant Héctor Edgardo Gazzolo) Marine Infantry Battalion platoon, military police, a small platoon of Marine Special Forces in the form of Tactical Divers (under Lieutenant Emilio Safi) and a canine platoon.

== Tumbledown defenders ==
Marine Captain Eduardo Villarraza's N Company from the 5th Marine Battalion would defend Mounts Tumbledown and William

- 1st Platoon, Marine Second Lieutenant (Guardiamarina) Carlos Bianchi, was dug in on Mount William
- 2nd Platoon, Marine Second Lieutenant Marcelo Oruezabala, between Tumbledown and William
- 3rd Platoon, Marine Sergeant Suboficial or Chief Petty Officer Jorge Lucero, on the Northern slopes of Tumbledown, overlooking Moody Brook
- 4th Platoon, Marine Lieutenant Carlos Daniel Vázquez, dug in near the summit, covering the Western approaches
- Marine Engineers 5th Platoon, Lieutenant Héctor Omar Miño, behind the 4th Platoon, facing North in support of Lucero's men
- Heavy machine guns and dogs from the Marine Corps Headquarters Battalion on Mount Tumbledown and Sapper Hill
- Marine Tigercat SAM launchers and Marine anti-tank guns, one on Mount William in support of Bianchi's platoon and Lucero's men.
- Marine SAM Platoon, with British Blowpipe and Russian SA-7 MPADS on Sapper Hill
- Marine 60mm Mortar Platoon, split in two sections near the Tumbledown summit, under Marine Sergeants David Ramos and Lucio Monzón.
- Lieutenant Emilio Safi and his small Marine Special Forces platoon located in the Cambers Peninsula would first reconnoitre San Carlos after the British landings on 21 May and then monitor British ship movements from an observation post in Lively Island from the start of June.

At the time of the battle, Marine Teniente de Navio Eduardo Villarraza's N Company was stationed on Tumbledown, Mount William was occupied by O Company of the Marine battalion, commanded by Marine Captain Ricardo Quiroga. In reserve behind N Company was B (Bravo) Company of the 6th Army Regiment, under Major Oscar Ramón Jaimet, M Company, led by Marine Captain Rodolfo Oscar Cionchi, was stationed on Sapper Hill.

== Early moves ==
On the morning of 13 June, the Scots Guards were moved by helicopter from their position at Bluff Cove to an assembly area near Goat Ridge, west of Mount Tumbledown. The British plan called for a diversionary attack south of Mount Tumbledown by a small number of the Scots Guards, assisted by the four light tanks of the Blues and Royals, while the main attack came as a three-phase silent advance from the west of Mount Tumbledown.

In the first phase, G company would take the western end of the mountain. In the second phase, Left Flank (company) would pass through the area taken by G company to capture the centre of the summit. In the third phase, Right Flank would pass through Left Flank to secure the eastern end of Tumbledown.

A daytime assault was initially planned but was postponed at the British battalion commander's request. In a meeting with his company commanders, the consensus was that the long uphill assault across the harsh ground of Tumbledown would be suicidal in daylight.

The British 'softening up' bombardment began at 7:30 local time, Major Jaimet later recalled:

I heard the cries of the wounded calling for their comrades, twelve men wounded before nightfall. We thought we had suffered before, but what luxury and comfort compared to this.

During the battle, the 5th Marines Command Post took five direct hits, but Commander Robacio emerged unscathed.

== Diversion ==
At 8:30 p.m. on 13 June, the diversionary attack began. The 2nd Battalion Scots Guards' Reconnaissance Platoon and Pipes & Drums Platoon, commanded by Major Richard Bethell (a former SAS officer) and supported by four light tanks of the Blues and Royals clashed with the Argentine Marine O Company under Marine Captain Quiroga in a blocking position on the lower slopes of Mount William. On William's southern slopes, an anti-tank mine detonation disabled one of the light tanks, causing minor injuries to its three-man crew.

The initial advance was unopposed, but a heavy firefight broke out when British troops made contact with Argentinian defences. The Argentinians opened fire, killing two British soldiers (Drill Sergeant Daniel Wight and Lance-Corporal John Pashley) and wounding four others. After two hours of hard fighting, the Argentinian company withdrew to its main defences on William and the British secured the position. Marine First Class Private José Luis Fazio fought against Bethell's force:

At about 22:30 hours our battalion had its first intensive gun battle with British companies which appeared out of nowhere. I heard Private Roberto Barboza yell "The English are here!" ... I remember our Operations Officer requested the artillery to assist at 23.00 with star shells. The close quarter battle was such that the Argentine artillery was unable to drop shells on to the British attackers. I was shooting, doing my work. I don't know if I killed anyone. We just fired our rifles, that's all. Contact was maintained for over an hour before battalion headquarters ordered Obra Company to fall back ... What we did not realise at the time was that a wounded (Argentine) Marine made his way to the amphibious engineer platoon and threw a grenade, wounding a (British) Major (Richard Bethell). Simultaneously, the Major opened fire, killing him.

After the successful diversion, the British force withdrew, carrying their wounded with them. During the withdrawal, two additional soldiers were injured by shellfire and four more after inadvertently entering a minefield. The explosions of the mines prompted Argentine Marine Major Antonio Pernías (Operations Officer, 5th Marines) to instruct the 81 mm mortar platoon stationed on Mount William, as well as the longer-range 120mm mortar pieces from to 'C' Company, 3rd Infantry Regiment on Sapper Hill, to open fire on both the minefield and the potential withdrawal route of any forces attacking Mount William. The barrage lasted approximately forty minutes. British casualties were slightly mitigated as the mortar shells predominantly landed on soft peat, which lessened the impact of the explosion. The diversion suffered a total of 2 killed, Lance Corporal Pashley of 9 Parachute Squadron and WO2 Danny Wight, with 16 more wounded, according to Guardsmen Steven William Duffy and Peter Alexander MacInnes from the Pipes & Drums Platoon, during a televised interview conducted in the site in 2007.

Marines Privates Omar Iñiguez, Aldo Osmar Patrone and Juan Francisco from O Company were killed fighting Major Bethell's force.

== Night attack ==
Final Actions, 13 to 14 June 1982.

At 9 p.m., half an hour after the start of the diversionary attack, Major Iain Dalzel-Job's G Company started its two-mile advance. Reaching its objective undetected, the company found the western end of the mountain undefended and occupied it easily, but later came under shellfire that wounded 10.

Major John Kiszely's Left Flank passed through them and reached the central region of the peak unopposed, but then came under heavy fire.

The Argentinians, later learned to be of company strength, directed mortar, grenade, machine gun and small arms fire from close range at the British company, killing three British soldiers (Guardsman Ronald Tanbini, Guardsman Archibald Stirling and Sergeant John Simeon). Marine Sub-Lieutenant Héctor Mino's 5th Platoon (1st Amphibious Engineer Company), held the rocks behind Sub-Lieutenant Carlos Vázquez's 4th Platoon, N Company. In the centre of the 4th Marine Platoon position were the remnants of Second Lieutenants Óscar Silva's and Marcelo Llambías-Pravaz's RI 4 platoons as well as the remnants of Second Lieutenants Celestino Mosteirín's and Marcelo Dorigón's RI 12 platoons, which had recently fought on Two Sisters, Goat Ridge and Mount Harriet. Backing them near the summit were two sections of mortamen (under Sergeants David Ramos and Lucio Monzón) from the 5th Marines 60-mm Mortar Platoon.

For between four and five hours, a contingent of Argentine defenders, including a composite force of Marine and Army personnel from six infantry platoons, engineers and a platoon of mortar operators, held their positions on Tumbledown, preventing the advance of British forces. To identify enemy bunkers, British Guardsmen fired Illuminating Parachute flares toward the summit. Both sides engaged in a sustained exchange of fire, with the Guardsmen deploying 66mm and 84mm anti-tank rounds, while the Argentine forces, firing from cover, retaliated using rifle grenades. Despite the assault, the Argentine defenders remained resolute, shouting obscenities in English and even singing the Marcha de las Malvinas.

Lieutenant Colonel Michael Scott, the commanding officer of the 2nd Battalion, Scots Guards, considered the possibility of withdrawing and launching another assault the following night. Reflecting on the situation, he later remarked,

The old nails were being bitten a bit, if we hadn't held on to Tumbledown, it might have encouraged them to keep on fighting.

=== Left flank ===
The fighting was hard going for Left Flank, as Argentine forces were well prepared with entrenched machine guns and snipers. However, at 2:30 a.m., a renewed British assault succeeded in overwhelming the troops of the 4th and 12th Regiments. Despite this, the surviving members of Vazquez's 4th Platoon continued to resist until approximately 7:00 a.m. British forces ultimately secured control of the mountaintop, inflicting casualties, capturing numerous defenders from the 4th and 12th Regiments, and, in some instances, engaging in close-quarters combat with fixed bayonets. Marine Private Jorge Sanchez recalled:

The fighting was sporadic, but at times fierce, as we tried to maintain our position. By this time we had ten or twelve dead, including one officer [Second Lieutenant Oscar Silva, Argentine Army]. I hadn't fired directly at a British soldier, as they had been too hard to get a clear shot at. I can remember lying there with all this firing going over my head. They were everywhere. The platoon commander [Marine Sub-Lieutenant Carlos Daniel Vazquez] then called Private Ramon Rotela, manning a 60-millimetre mortar and Rotela fired it straight up into the air so that the bombs landed on ourselves. At this point I had been up and in actual combat for over six hours. It was snowing and we were tired. Some of the guys had surrendered, but I didn't want to do this. I had only twenty rounds left and I decided to continue the fight from Mount William. I popped up, fired a rifle grenade in the direction of 8 to 10 British soldiers to keep their heads down, and then ran for the 2nd Platoon. I can remember saying some type of prayer hoping the British wouldn't shoot me in the back.

Major Kiszely, who was to become a senior general after the war, was the first man into the Argentine position, shooting two Argentine conscripts and bayoneting a third. Seeing their company commander among the enemy inspired 14 and 15 Platoons to make the final dash across open ground to of the remaining Argentine Marines. Kiszely and six other Guardsmen suddenly found themselves standing on top of the mountain, looking down on Stanley, which was under street lighting and vehicles could be seen moving along the roads.

Argentine forces, consisting of Second Lieutenant Augusto La Madrid's platoon from Major Jaimet's B Company and Marine Lieutenant Héctor Miño's amphibious engineer platoon reinforced by Marine Lieutenant Waldemar Aquino and Marine Second Lieutenant De Marco, launched a counterattack. During the assault, a burst of machine-gun fire from La Madrid’s unit wounded three Guardsmen, including Lieutenant Alasdair Mitchell, commander of 15 Platoon and a bullet struck the compass attached to the belt of Major Kiszely.

For his role in leading a bayonet charge during the engagement, Kiszely was awarded the Military Cross.

== Counterattack ==
By 6 a.m., the advance of Left Flank had come to a halt, resulting in significant casualties among the Guards. On the eastern sector of the mountain, the conscript platoons of La Madrid and Miño were attempting to resume their assault, wounding with hand grenades another three Guardsmen in the process. In response, Colonel Scott issued orders for Right Flank to advance and eliminate the remaining enemy positions. Second Lieutenant La Madrid later provided an account of the combat:

I went forward to make a reconnaissance and could see that the British had two machine guns and a missile launcher in action. I went through another gap in the rocks and was surprised by three men speaking in English behind and above me and firing over the top of me. I could see them with my night binoculars ... I took a rifle grenade and fired at where I had seen the first three men. I heard it explode and some shouts and cries of pain ... I ran back to my position and ordered my men to open fire. We stopped them, but they thinned out and came round our flanks ... They also engaged us with light mortars and missile launchers. This went on for a long time, and we suffered heavy casualties ... We started to run short of ammunition ... Also, I could see that we were outflanked, with the British behind us, so we were cut off from my company ... I reorganized and found that I was down to sixteen men. I started to retire ... I left six men (under Corporal Marcos Elbio Palomo) in a line with a machine gun to cover our retreat, but really we were fighting all the time, we could not break contact. They came on us fast, and we fell back ... We eventually got through to Stanley through what I would like to say was a perfect barrage fired by the Royal Artillery. We had to wait for breaks in the firing, but I still lost a man killed there.

Major Simon Price sent 2 and 3 Platoons forward, preceded by a volley of 66mm rockets to clear the Argentine reinforcements. Major Price placed 1 Platoon high up in the rocks to provide fire support for the assault troops.

Lieutenant Robert Lawrence led 3 Platoon in a flanking manoeuvre to the right of the Argentinian positions, intending to catch the defenders off guard. However, the British troops were spotted and temporarily pinned down by enemy fire. Despite this, a bayonet charge was launched, successfully overrunning the Argentinian defenders. Lance-Corporal Graham Rennie of 3 Platoon later recounted the British assault:

Our assault was initiated by a Guardsman killing a sniper, which was followed by a volley of 66mm anti-tank rounds. We ran forward in extended line, machine gunners and riflemen firing from the hip to keep the enemy heads down, enabling us to cover the open ground in the shortest possible time. Halfway across the open ground, 2 Platoon went to ground to give covering fire support, enabling us to gain a foothold on the enemy position. From then on we fought from crag to crag, rock to rock, taking out pockets of enemy and lone riflemen, all of whom resisted fiercely.

Lieutenants La Madrid and Miño withdrew their respective platoons, sustaining five killed during the counterattack. In an effort to support them, the platoons under Second Lieutenants Aldo Franco and Guillermo Robredo advanced from the eastern edge of the mountain. As the British forces pressed forward from the central region of Tumbledown, they again encountered intense Argentine resistance. However, by advancing in pairs under covering fire, they successfully engaged and cleared the remaining Bravo Company platoons, ultimately securing control over the eastern sector of Mount Tumbledown.

Right Flank had secured its objective at the cost of five wounded, Left Flank sustained two dead and several wounded during the Argentine counterattack when supporting mortar fire from Mount William deliberately or mistakenly targeted British wounded and their stretcher bearers.

At the moment of victory on the eastern slopes, Lawrence was nearly killed when a bullet, reportedly fired by an Argentine "sniper," struck the side of his head. He was later awarded the Military Cross for bravery, though he endured a year in a wheelchair and the use of his left arm.

The Argentine was identified by Lieutenant La Madrid as Private Luis Jorge Bordón or Walter Ignacio Becerra armed with an Argentine standard FN FAL rifle, and providing covering fire for the Argentine retreat. He also fired on a Westland Scout helicopter evacuating casualties from Tumbledown, wounding two men, Guardsman Kenny Mains and Captain Swinton, the Forward Observation Officer (FOO) attached to the Gurkhas as they moved toward Mount William. He was eventually killed by the concentrated fire of several Guardsmen.

== Fall of Tumbledown ==
By 9:00 a.m., the Scots Guards had secured the high ground to the east of Tumbledown Mountain, while the Gurkha units began advancing across the saddle extending southward from Tumbledown to Mount William. The Gurkhas captured Mount William, sustaining eight wounded, primarily due to artillery fire.

During the engagement, the Scots Guards captured 30 prisoners, several of whom were from Bravo Company of Regiment of Infantry 6. Additionally, the bodies of 30 Argentine Army and Marine personnel were discovered in and around the defensive perimeter of the 5th Marine Battalion.

The 2nd Battalion, Scots Guards, suffered eight fatalities and 43 wounded. According to Sergeant Thomas MacGuinnes of 13 Platoon, who played a significant role in overcoming Argentine defences, a further 20 to 30 Guardsmen from Left Flank Company remained immobile, having sustained concussions from Argentine artillery, mortars, and rifle-grenade fire, or after experiencing falls on the wet and rugged terrain during the prolonged engagement.

Additional casualties were also recorded among other attached British units, the supporting Royal Engineers and Welsh Guards each suffered one fatality, with a combined total of 13 wounded, including 8 Gurkhas and a Forward Observation Officer attached to the Ghurkas, Captain Keith Swinton. Corporal Krishnakumar Rai from the Gurkhas was also killed clearing the battlefield from mines and booby-traps.

Dhanbahadur Rai, a Gurkha soldier, provided an account of the battle:

The Scots Guards were assigned to attack Tumbledown, with the Gurkhas following in support. We were meant to complete the assault while they provided covering fire from Tumbledown. During the night, we advanced behind the Scots Guards, but at one point, our commanding officer ordered us to halt. The terrain resembled a valley, and after stopping, artillery bombardment commenced. The headquarters and A Company sustained twelve wounded. The following morning, as we resumed movement, our commanding officer, the MILAN anti-tank Platoon commander and Forward Observation Officer were advancing when they came under rifle fire. Our commanding officer shouted, "Look, Goli Ayo!" ("Get down! Someone fired!"). The FOO was standing and observing when a second shot struck him in the chest.

== Assault of Sapper Hill ==
=== Relevant deployments ===
While the majority of the 5th Marine Battalion was stationed on Mounts Tumbledown and William, M Company was positioned along the slopes of Sapper Hill. Their deployment was reinforced by a number of batteries of the 1st Marine Anti-Aircraft Battalion, as well as a contingent from the Marine Dog Platoon with five military working dogs: Ñaro, Nego, Vogel, Warner and Xuavia, their handlers and accompanying riflemen, all under the command of Sub-Lieutenant Miguel Paz.

Also present on Sapper Hill were half a battery of 155 mm guns from the 101st Artillery Group, the 120mm Heavy Mortar Platoon (under Lieutenant Alejandro Landa) from Captain Ramón Alberto Varela's C Company (3rd Army Infantry Regiment), and the Reconnaissance Platoon (under Lieutenant Norman Osvaldo Reynoso) from the 3rd General Manuel Belgrano Mechanized Infantry Regiment. A mobile Westinghouse AN/TPS-43 long-range radar had been positioned on Sapper Hill since April.

On 1 May, a Royal Navy bombardment of Sapper Hill killed Private Daniel Cabiglioli (from M Company). The Westinghouse radar was damaged and would remain out of service for several days. That night, patrolling near Sapper Hill, a five-man squad (under Sergeant Miguel Angel Martinez) from the 3rd Regiment's Reconnaissance Platoon discovered an abandoned rubber boat. The following day, the 1st Assault Section of the 601st Commando Company, led by First Lieutenant José Martiniano Duarte, checked the boat for explosives before transporting it to Port Stanley for further examination.

In early June, Lieutenant Reynoso's Recce Platoon exchanged small arms fire with a British patrol, most likely G Squadron SAS, who had commandeered a yacht at Bluff Cove Settlement to operate behind Tumbledown and sent men forward in a helicopter.

On 12 June, Harrier XW919 was hit by shrapnel, possibly from a Tigercat missileand damaged while dropping CBUs on an artillery position near Sapper Hill. During the recovery, the aircraft caught fire on Hermes flight deck, owing to a fractured reaction pipe. Argentine sources claim that the aircraft was hit by AAA immediately after an attack on a 155 mm howitzer, which was lightly damaged with six soldiers wounded. The Harrier was repaired and though still operational, was ultimately transferred to the School of Flight Deck Operations at Culdrose, and eventually donated to the Polish Aviation Museum, Kraków.

On 13 June, a Welsh Guards messenger (Lance Corporal Chris Thomas), bringing forward food supplies to Major Christopher Drewrywe's Number 2 Company (1WG), was killed when his motorbike ran over a mine or was hit by mortar fire.

=== Last Stand ===
At dawn on 14 June, Major Phillip Neame's D Company of 2 PARA, engaged in the final stages of the Battle of Wireless Ridge, reported observing a large concentration of Argentine forces regrouping on Sapper Hill. Argentine artillery units and a platoon from the 6th Regiment under Second Lieutenant La Madrid remained operational, engaging Neame's company before incurring further casualties, including Privates Horacio Echave and Horacio Balvidares.

As Argentine forces repositioned on Sapper Hill, additional casualties were sustained due to a British bombardment and retaliatory fire from Wireless Ridge. Among those killed were Sergeant Víctor Hugo Juárez from the 5th Marine Battalion Headquarters, Private Vicente Antonio Díaz from the 1st Amphibious Engineers Company, and Private Ricardo Ramírez from the 81mm Mortar Platoon stationed on Mount William.

The Welsh Guards and Royal Marine Battalion were placed on standby to support the British offensives against Mounts Tumbledown and William. Their orders were to advance toward Sapper Hill only once these objectives had been secured. However, during their movement, they became entangled in a minefield, significantly delaying their progress. While attempting to extricate themselves, they came under heavy mortar fire from Argentine positions on Sapper Hill.

Major Drewrywe's Welsh Guards eventually reached the base of Sapper Hill, only to find that the Argentine M Company remained in position. As a result, the Guardsmen were compelled to withdraw, using the morning fog as cover and this time avoiding the minefield.

Due to these delays, it was decided that 45 Commando should advance from Two Sisters to seize Sapper Hill. As 45 Commando moved forward, Alpha and Charlie Companies of 40 Commando evaded detection by Argentine defenders and were airlifted by helicopter. They landed on the slopes of Sapper Hill shortly before 45 Commando's arrival, and together, both units launched an assault, ultimately securing the hill.

=== Argentine Retreat ===
Unwilling to abandon Tumbledown, Commander Carlos Robacio on Sapper Hill was planning to counterattack and drive back the Guardsmen. Only the personal intervention of Colonel Félix Aguiar, the 10th Brigade Chief of Staff, via radio brought the fighting to an end in the Tumbledown sector. The 5th Marines worked their way back into Stanley, leaving the 2nd Platoon of Marine Second Lieutenant Marcelo Davis and 3rd Platoon of Marine Second Lieutenant Alejandro Koch of M Company to cover the retreat. The Argentine Marine companies withdrew safely, although pursued by artillery fire and hit by a laser-guided bomb dropped by Wg Cdr Peter Squire in XZ997 killing two of the Marine canines, Nego and Ñaro. Argentine Panhard armoured cars were moved forward to the edge of Stanley to cover the retreating Argentine Marines.

Marine Privates Roberto Leyes, Eleodoro Monzón and Sergio Ariel from M Company were killed protecting the Argentine retreat from Sapper Hill. Six Royal Marines were wounded by mines and small-arms fire securing Sapper Hill, including four Marines from 40 Commando, one Sapper from Condor Troop and a field-grade officer (Major Brian Armitage) from 3 Commando Brigade HQs.

The Royal Marines, under Second Lieutenant Carl Bushby, defended their position in 9 Troop as Argentine Marines, commanded by Davis, launched a counterattack, the final assault of the ground campaign. Two British Sea Kings parked within range of Koch's Marines were repeatedly hit and damaged by machine-gun fire and rifle grenades from Sergeant Miguel Angel Vaca and Corporal Carlos Jorge Sini, according to Marine Chris Pretty:

We had landed on the small, light-coloured gravel track just at the base of the rocky spine of Sapper Hill, and the choppers were being shot to pieces. We were still inside. We were being shot to pieces. I remember someone shouting, 'It's okay, it's only the Gurkhas on Mount William.' ... Exit, road and think. I remember the tail rotor being very close to me as I crouched on the road. The choppers revved up and leapt into the air. I remember seing them lift off with bits coming off them and banking away to the right and away they went.

At the foot of the hill, there was an enormous minefield. Lieutenant Paul Allen and Marine Wayne McGregor of 7 Troop were both wounded activating anti-personnel mines. A group of Sappers from Condor Troop went ahead to clear a path through the mines, with Sergeant Peter Thorpe wounded in the process. Tanks of the Blues & Royals moved forward to provide covering fire if required. During the helicopter evacuations of the wounded, Captain Sam Drennan of No. 656 Squadron would win the Distinguished Flying Cross for rescuing a wounded Gurkha and Guardsman from the middle of a minefield. However, when the Royal Marines and Welsh Guardsmen advanced again, they found Sapper Hill abandoned. The delay caused by the mines probably saved many lives. The Argentine Marine companies had been deeply entrenched and were well equipped with heavy machine guns. To Guardsman Tracy Evens, the Sapper Hill positions looked impregnable:

We were led to an area that the company would rest at for the night, I still took in the fact that the Argies had prepared Sapper Hill well, they had depth positions that would have made the task of taking it very hard.

As the Guardsmen secured their positions, the British forces lost a Volvo Bv 202 tracked vehicle to a mine in the Sapper Hill sector.

"We ran over a mine. I went up through the roof and the vehicle went up and was turned right round by the explosion", recalled Major Brian Armitage who was shortly evacuated to receive medical treatment.

== Military recognition ==
For the courage displayed in the attack, men from 2 SG were awarded one Distinguished Service Order, two Military Crosses, two Distinguished Conduct Medals (one posthumously) and two Military Medals. Men from 9 Para Squadron, Royal Engineers, were awarded two Military Medals and Captain Sam Drennan, the Army Air Corps Scout pilot who had picked up the injured soldiers under fire and a former Scots Guards NCO, received the Distinguished Flying Cross.

Carlos Robacio, BIM5 commander, was awarded the Argentine Nation to the Valour in Combat Medal and the battalion itself was decorated by the Argentine Congress in 2002.

Due to his actions on both Two Sisters and Tumbledown, Private Oscar Ismael Poltronieri of La Madrid's platoon was awarded the Argentine Nation to the Heroic Valour in Combat Cross, Argentina's highest military decoration. He is the only conscript soldier in his nation's recent history who has received this honour.

After the battle, Pipe Major James Riddell of 2 SG stood near the top of the mountain and played his bagpipes. He played a quick march he had composed "on the back of a fag packet" during the battle, following a long tradition in which Pipe Majors were encouraged "to write tunes to commemorate any actions in which their regiments have been engaged". He named the tune The Crags of Tumbledown Mountain. It was released as a single by the Pipes and Drums of 2SG a year later.

== Tumbledown after the war ==
- The film Tumbledown, directed by Richard Eyre, premiered on 30 May 1988. It is based on the experiences of Lieutenant Robert Lawrence, who was severely wounded during the battle. The film won the RTS Television Award 1989 for best male actor for Colin Firth's performance in the lead role
- The film Resurrected was made by Channel 4 based on the story of Philip Williams, accused of cowardice and desertion, with David Thewlis in the lead role
- In 2012, Argentine journalist Nicolás Kasanzew wrote a tango called "Carlos Daniel Vazquez's Thermopylae," which is sung by Carlos Longoni
- A cross has been erected at the summit of the mountain as a memorial to the soldiers who died in the battle
- Two British artists have depicted the battle in painting, Mark Churms and Terence Cuneo, the latter commissioned by the Scots Guards
- In the UK a Tumbledown Veterans and Families Association was created
- There is a pipe march written by James Riddell of the 2nd Battalion Scots Guards "The Crags Of Tumbledown Mountain"
- An ode was written in honour of the fallen

It was the Guardsmen of the Crown
Who scaled the Heights of Tumbledown
And fought that night a bloody fight
To see victory by dawn's first light.
From crag to crag amongst the rock,
They skirmished on, numbed by shock.
Through shell and mortar fire they moved,
Till at last the ground they'd proved
Port Stanley lay there... just ahead,
As they began to count their dead.
But where the glory, where the pride,
Of those eight brave men who died?
They who made that lonely sacrifice
And through each death paid the total price
In their final and heroic act,
Did surely speed the warring parties pact.
Each one who there his life laid down,
Saved countless others from their own unknown.
So those of you who live to talk,
Let your pride hover as does the hawk.
And never let men these acts forget,
Nor the memory of our dead neglect,
But once returned across this vast sea,
Remember then just what it was to be...
A Scots Guardsman.

— "Ode to Tumbledown", Lieutenant Mark Mathewson

- In April 2019, a memorial was unveiled in front of Tumbledown Mountain and Mount William in memory of Lance-Corporal Budhaparsad Limbu and Corporal Krishnakumar Rai from the Gurkhas killed while clearing enemy booby traps shortly after the Argentine surrender
