= Philip Williams (soldier) =

Former British Army soldier

Philip "Willie" Williams is a former British Army soldier who served in the Scots Guards, best known for surviving for seven weeks after becoming separated from his unit during the Battle of Mount Tumbledown in the Falklands War of 1982.

== Early life ==
Philip Williams was born on 24 August 1963 to Alan and Rosemary Williams. The family lived in Halton-on-Lune, near Morecambe in Lancashire, England. He had four siblings, sisters Angela, Karen and Cherith, and one brother Gareth. Following school, Philip worked a series of menial jobs, such as slaughtering chickens and labouring.

== Military career ==
Philip Williams saw little opportunities for someone without higher qualifications. As a result, Williams joined the British Army's Scots Guards as a 17 year old guardsman in 1981, notably taking part in ceremonial duties in London. Williams enjoyed military life, but stated that he felt lesser kinship than his fellow soldiers, due to their greater sense of patriotism in addition to the normalisation of racism and misogyny.

In April 1982, as a Guardsman of the 2nd Battalion, Scots Guards, Williams was deployed to take part in the Falklands War. Williams is reported to have witnessed the aerial bombing of the landing ships RFA Sir Galahad and RFA Sir Tristram at Bluff Cove.

On the night of 13-14 June 1982, Williams took part in the night advance on Mount Tumbledown, volunteering as a stretcher bearer. Another soldier reported that Williams had assisted him with a stretcher, before going back up the hill to search for more wounded. Shortly after reportedly coming under Argentine sniper fire, Williams was knocked to the ground by an explosion, caused by a shell or grenade. The stretcher party had scattered amid the fighting, darkness and poor weather conditions. Unable to be found, Williams was listed as missing, presumed dead and was given a memorial service.

Seven weeks later, Williams emerged at the farmhouse of Kevin Kilmartin at Bluff Cove, a distance of 50 miles from Mount Tumbledown. Williams had spent 48 days wandering in the cold, including through areas covered with land mines, and scavenging for food, unaware that the war with Argentina was over. He had sheltered in an abandoned hut, hiding from what he thought were Argentine patrols. Military officials reported that Williams had survived on his rations for three days, before scavenging from abandoned military supply caches, as well as fish, crab and mussels from the shoreline. After running out of supplies, Williams left the hut and decided to follow a set of telegraph poles to Bluff Cove. A Ministry of Defence official reported that Williams had been suffering from amnesia. Williams returned to Great Britain with the rest of his regiment through RAF Brize Norton on 10 August 1982, and reunited with his family.

William's 'resurrection' caused a media sensation. Initial coverage portrayed him as a hero who came back from the dead, while later coverage became more critical and hostile, with accusations of cowardice and desertion. While officially cleared of wrongdoing by the Army, Williams experienced issues reintegrating into day-to-day military life, describing feelings of isolation, victimisation and abuse within the army. In his later memoirs, Williams describes being bullied and badly beaten. In 1983, Williams was discharged, under psychiatric grounds.

== Later life ==
Williams found it difficult to adjust to civilian life. In June 1984, he was arrested after striking a two-year-old girl and her four month year old sister while babysitting for the home of which we was a lodger in Lancaster. A doctor who examined the children found that they had sustained bruising. In a statement, Williams told police that he had been suffering from an amphetamine addiction, and that he thought the baby-sitting might have kept-his mind off it. However, he had become annoyed at the children and hit them. Williams pleaded guilty in causing the two children actual bodily harm.

In 1990, Williams along with writer Maurice Power published Summer Soldier, a memoir of his experience in and after service.

== In popular culture ==
The story of Philip Williams ordeal and aftermath is depicted in the 1989 film Resurrected directed by Paul Greengrass in his directorial debut. Written as a film à clef, Williams is portrayed by David Thewlis under the pseudonym of Kevin Deakin. The actual Philip Williams can be spotted in an amusement arcade scene as a dishevelled figure operating a shooter arcade game that Deakin walks past.

== See also ==
- Battle of Mount Tumbledown
- Nish Bruce
