= Canache =

Canache may refer to:

In Greek mythology (Κανάχη):

- Canache, same as Canace
- Canache, one of Actaeon's dogs

Other uses:

- The Canache, a bay in Stanley Harbour
- Canache, a family name occurring in Spanish-speaking world
