= Sapper Hill =

Hill on East Falkland

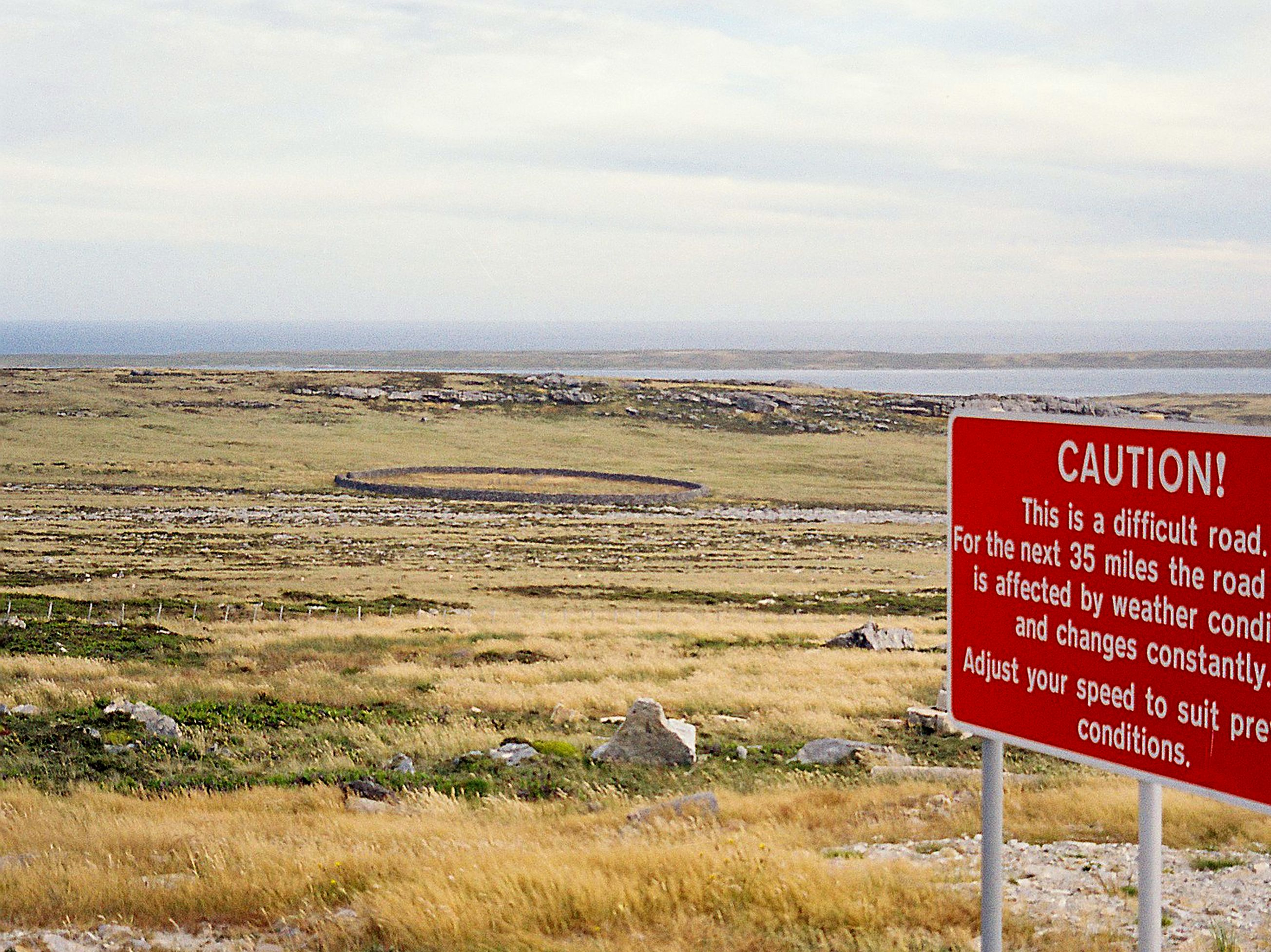
- Gaucho stone corral at Sapper Hill, (120 m in diameter, 3 m high); dated 1840s

Highest point
- Coordinates: 51.707°S 57.870°W

Geography
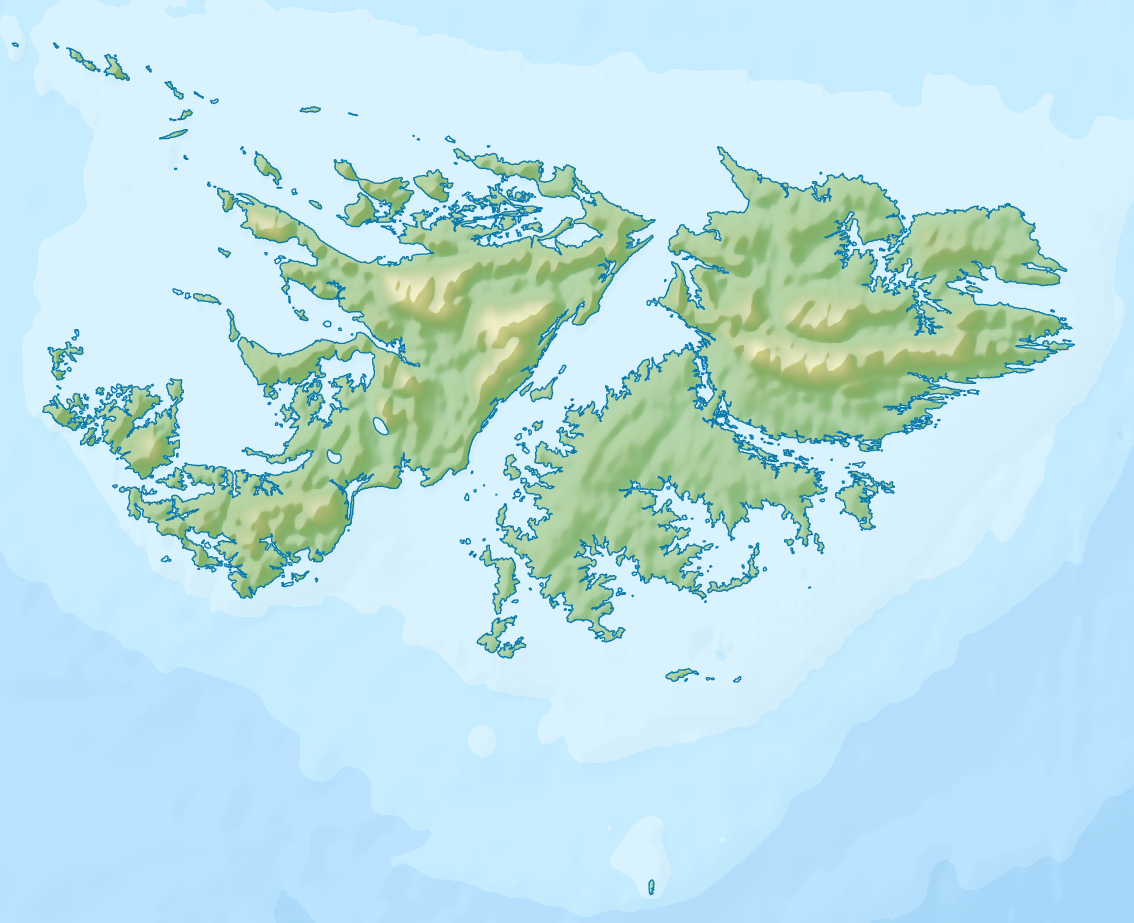
- Location within Falkland Islands
- Location: East Falkland, Falkland Islands, south Atlantic Ocean

Sapper Hill (453 ft) is on East Falkland, located just south of Stanley, the Falklands Islands capital. It is named after a troop of sappers who were once billeted at Moody Brook barracks.

== Falklands War ==
Mount Tumbledown, Mount William and Sapper Hill lie west of the Falkland Islands capital Stanley and due to their proximity to Stanley were of strategic importance during the 1982 War. They were held by the Argentine 5th Naval Infantry Battalion (BIM 5), a reinforced, cold weather trained and equipped Marine battalion. The 5th Marines were strengthened by three Tigercat SAM, an Hispano-Suiza 35mm battery of the 1st Marine Anti-Aircraft Regiment, the heavy machine-gun company of the Headquarters Battalion and part of Marine Dog Platoon with 5 canines Ñaro, Nego, Vogel, Warner and Xuavia and their handlers.

The bulk of the 5th Marine Battalion was deployed on Mounts Tumbledown and William.

BIM 5 positions were bombarded, from the sea by naval gunfire and from the air by Royal Air Force Harriers, during May and June. On 1 May a Private from M Company was killed during a Naval bombardment.

As part of the British plan for the Battle of Mount Tumbledown, the 1st Battalion the 7th Gurkha Rifles (1/7 GR) was given the task of capturing the sub-hill of Mount William held by O Company, the 5th Marine Battalion's reserve, and then allow the Royal Marines under the command of the Welsh Guards through to seize Sapper Hill, the final obstacle before Stanley. The attacks were supported by naval gunfire from HMS Active. During the initial assault, Royal Marines from C company, 40 Commando were inserted close to the Argentine position by helicopter and immediately began an assault using General Purpose Machine Guns and 66mm anti-tank rockets.

After the Battle of Mount Tumbledown, the 5th Marines withdrew to Stanley, leaving M Company to cover their retreat. Three Argentine Marines were killed covering the withdrawal in a firefight with men from 9 Troop Charlie Company, 40 Commando Royal Marines. Marine Midshipman Marcelo Davis's 1st Platoon from M/BIM 5 attempted a counterattack but were beaten back. As the Argentine Marine companies withdrew, they were targeted by a laser-guided bomb dropped by Wing Commander Peter Squire in XZ997 killing two of the Marine canines, Negro and Ñaro.

Argentine Panhard armoured cars were moved forward to the edge of Stanley to cover the retreating troops.

When the Welsh Guardsmen advanced they found Sapper Hill abandoned.

We were led to an area that the company would rest at for the night, I still took in the fact the Argies had prepared Sapper Hill well, they had depth positions that would have made the task of taking it very hard. (Excerpt from the diary of Guardsman Tracy Evans, who served in 4 Platoon, 2 Company, 1st Battalion Welsh Guards)

== Demining operations ==
Almost 30 years after Britain and Argentina went to war, a project was launched to rid the territory of the approximately 19,000 landmines left by Argentine troops and that BACTEC International Ltd. had been awarded the contract to clear four sites at Fox Bay, Goose Green, Sapper Hill, and Surf Bay. On 11 December 2009, demining work started at Sapper Hill and on a battle area clearance task adjacent to the demining area. The Sapper Hill site was declared clear of mines on 25 March 2010.
