= Carlos Büsser =

Argentine naval officer

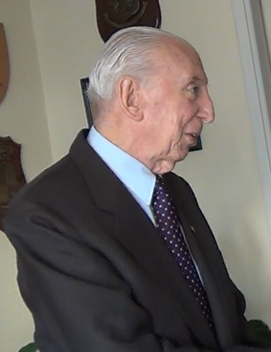
- Büsser in 2012

Chief of the Joint Chiefs of Staff of the Armed Forces of the Argentine Republic
- In office 20 September 1982 – 15 December 1983
- Preceded by: Leopoldo Suárez del Cerro
- Succeeded by: Julio Fernández Torres

Personal details
- Born: 10 January 1928 Rosario, Argentina
- Died: 29 September 2012 (aged 84) Buenos Aires, Argentina
- Spouse: Delia
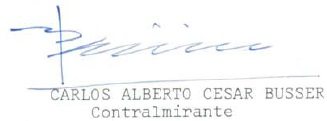
- Signature

Military service
- Allegiance: Argentina
- Branch/service: Argentine Navy
- Years of service: 1947-1984
- Rank: Counter Admiral

Carlos Alberto César Büsser (10 January 1928 – 29 September 2012) was an Argentinian admiral who commanded Argentine forces during the 1982 invasion of the Falkland Islands, and forced the surrender of the Governor of the Falkland Islands, Rex Hunt. He also served as the Chief of the Joint Chiefs of Staff of the Armed Forces of the Argentine Republic.

== Early life ==
Carlos Alberto César Büsser was born in Rosario, Argentina, on 10 January 1928. He joined the Argentine Navy on 17 January 1947, and graduated from the Escuela Naval Militar in 1951. He earned a degree in business administration. He married Delia.

== Career ==
Büsser supported Isaac Rojas during the Revolución Libertadora in 1955. He was close to Emilio Eduardo Massera, who represented the navy in the National Reorganization Process after overthrowing President Isabel Perón in 1976. He served as Under Secretary of Public Information. He was promoted to Rear Admiral on 31 December 1979.

Büsser was one of the Argentinian commanders for the invasion of the Falkland Islands. He was made head of the 5th Marine Battalion. Governor Rex Hunt met with Büsser, demanding that the Argentinians leave, before surrendering. From 20 September 1982 to 15 December 1983, he was Chief of the Joint Chiefs of Staff. He retired from active duty on 1 April 1984.

== Later life ==
In 2009, Büsser was arrested for alleged human rights abuses at Port Belgrano Naval Base in the 1970s. He was accused of participating in the torture and disappearance of three people. Büsser was not convicted for any crimes, but was under house arrest until his death. He died in Buenos Aires on 29 September 2012.

== Works cited ==
=== Journals ===
- "Socios activos y vitalicios del Centro Naval, fallecidos durante 2011/2012" (PDF). Boletín del Centro Naval (34). Centro Naval. Archived from the original on 1 October 2020.

=== News ===
- "Carlos Büsser: murió el marino que encabezó el desembarco en Malvinas". La Nación. 1 October 2012. Archived from the original on 5 May 2026.
- "Malvinas: un audio recuerda la arenga a las tropas antes del desembarco". Diario Jornada. 1 April 2019. Archived from the original on 5 May 2026.
- "Rear-Admiral Carlos Büsser". The Daily Telegraph. 2 October 2012. Archived from the original on 25 December 2024.
- Norton-Taylor, Richard (12 November 2012). "Tributes to 'hero' former Falkland Islands governor Sir Rex Hunt". The Guardian. Archived from the original on 5 May 2026.

=== Web ===
- "LISTADO DE AUTORIDADES DESDE SU CREACION HASTA LA ACTUALIDAD". Chief of the Joint Chiefs of Staff. Archived from the original on 5 August 2012.
