= Resurrected (film) =

- DVD cover art
- Directed by: Paul Greengrass
- Written by: Martin Allen
- Produced by: Adrian Hughes; Tara Prem
- Starring: Tom Bell; Rita Tushingham; David Thewlis; Rudi Davies
- Cinematography: Ivan Strasburg
- Edited by: Dan Rae
- Music by: John E. Keane
- Distributed by: Castle Pictures Ltd. Hobo Film Enterprises
- Release date: February 1989
- Running time: 97 minutes
- Country: United Kingdom
- Language: English

Resurrected is a 1989 British drama film directed by Paul Greengrass in his directorial debut. Starring David Thewlis as Guardsman Kevin Deakin, it is based on the experiences of Philip Williams, a soldier in the Scots Guards during the Falklands War. During the Battle of Mount Tumbledown, Williams was separated from the rest of his unit following an explosion, before reappearing seven weeks later, weeks after the Argentine surrender.

Resurrected premiered at the 39th Berlin International Film Festival in February 1989.

The film was also the acting debut of actor and comedian Steve Coogan, who plays a supporting character.

== Synopsis ==
During the Battle of Mount Tumbledown, Guardsman Philip Williams was knocked unconscious by an explosion and left for dead. When he came to, the rest of the British forces had gone. William's parents were notified that Williams had been killed and a memorial service was held for him. Seven weeks later, when Williams returned to civilization, he is accused of cowardice and desertion by the media and fellow soldiers.

The actual Philip Williams can be spotted at an amusement arcade scene operating a shooter arcade game as Deakin walks past.

The 1990 book Summer Soldier, published by Philip Williams and Maurice Power, is a memoir of his experiences.

== Plot ==
In a quiet English village, a funeral in absentia is held for Guardsman Kevin Robert Deakin, honoured as a war hero by his grieving family, fellow soldiers of the Scots Guards and the wider public. Thousands of miles away, on a wilderness in the Falkland Islands, an exhausted soldier desperately scrambles across moorlands, until he reaches a line of telephone poles. Spotting him, a local sheep farmer suspects the man to be an Argentinean, before being shocked to discover that he is a British soldier. The soldier, now identified as Guardsman Kevin Deakin is debriefed by Corporal Byker and Major Dunbar, explaining that after assisting Guardsman Johnny Fodden during the Battle of Mount Tumbledown, he had no memory of the next three days. Deakin states that he survived the weeks after by consuming discarded rations while sheltering in an abandoned hut.

Deakin returns to England alongside the rest of the Scots Guards. However, at RAF Brize Norton, his family and girlfriend Julie are singled out by Army welfare officer Captain Sinclair and separated from the crowd. As Deakin steps off the Vickers VC10, Captain Sinclair pulls him aside, raising the suspicions of Guardsman Slaven. While being led away, Deakin is hounded by a reporter, who questions about whether he was a deserter. Upon returning to his village, Deakin receives a hero's welcome. The community holds a celebration with a party and band at the local pub. However, the party takes a strange turn when the vicar hands Deakin several 'souvenirs' from his funeral. Kevin and Julie share an intimate night together, with a TV broadcasting coverage of the victory in the war. Deakin awakes to a moment of domestic peace. However, upon reading the morning newspapers, suspicion had been planted that he had been a deserter. Kevin snaps back at Julie for pressing further. Kevin and his father head to the pub, but following the paper, the mood of the village has changed.

Kevin and Julie take a trip to Morecambe. Everything seems fine until a flashback of Fodden triggers an aggressive reaction, causing Kevin to grapple Julie. Overwhelmed by self-pity, he mutters that he should have stayed in the Falklands, and leaves to cool off by walking through the arcades. Watching a man play a shoot-'em-up game (the real Philip Williams) triggers another flashback. Meeting Julie again at the station, he asks her if she believes in ghosts, suggesting this is what he has become. Kevin listens to a recording of his mothers session with a séance, and later notices that his memorial record in the church has been ripped out. Deakin returns to barracks duty, where he is met with a cold response from his comrades Slaven and Hibbert, albeit a more sympathetic one from Bonner. Major Dunbar remarks to Corporal Byker that discipline and fighting spirit must be maintained, and that outliers will be flushed out by the system. Slaven and Hibbert taunt Deakin, resulting in a brawl in the mess. The fight is interrupted by Corporal Byker, remarking that he was cleared in an inquiry. Byker notes that the confrontation has left the mess divided. A bullet is found left on Deakin's bed.

Later in the year, Kevin returns to the village on leave for Guy Fawkes Day while drunk. Stumbling through the church and village green, he fails to connect with Julie, his family, or the locals. In an outburst, he condemns the war and scorns the village as hypocrites. The regiment receive their South Atlantic Medals, but upon returning to barracks Byker notices that Deakin does not join in celebrating with the rest of the regiment. A drunken mob led by Slaven and Hibbert confront the corporal, stating that they have "come for Deakin". Wishing to avoid a revolt, Byker concedes. The group, with Byker observing, conduct a show trial, despite an attempted intervention from Bonner. Deakin experiences another flashback of Fodden and a large explosion, and admits that he was scared. As punishment, the group sentence Deakin to a regimental bath, stripping, feeding him worms with dirt, soaking and brushing him down. Deakin is badly wounded, and is interred at Queen Elizabeth Military Hospital. Mr. and Mrs. Deakin confront Major Dunbar, only to be told that their son was never cut out to be a member of the elite Scots Guards. The family reconciles, pledging to support each other. Deakin recovers alongside the other war wounded. While the film Reach for the Sky plays in the background, Deakin finds Fodden behind a curtain and greets him.

== Cast ==
- Tom Bell as Mr Deakin
- Rita Tushingham as Mrs. Deakin
- David Thewlis as Kevin Deakin
- Rudi Davies as Julie
- Michael Pollitt as Gregory Deakin
- Christopher Fulford as Slaven
- Ewan Stewart as Corporal Byker
- David Lonsdale as Hibbert
- Peter Gunn as Bonner
- William Hoyland as Captain Sinclair
- Mark Wing-Davey as Major Dunbar
- Gary Mavers as Johnny Fodden
- Kenny Ireland as Denzil Clausen
- Philomena McDonagh as Ileen Clausen
- Lorraine Ashbourne as Reeva
- Michelle O'hare as Nurse 1
- Steve Coogan as Youth 2

== Reception ==
=== Critical response ===
Hilary Mantel of The Spectator appreciated Greengrass in creating a gritty and realistic atmosphere, noting the directors previous background in covering the Falklands War for ITV's World in Action programme. Mantel also praised the focus on the inability for the military to treat "psychological cripples", and the failure of civilians to understand the realities of war. She praised the main cast for their performance, while criticized the scenes of Deakin struggling to communicate as overly repetitive and posited that the writing may be more suited for a television film.
