= Alistair Irwin =

British Army general (born 1948)

Lieutenant General Sir Alistair Irwin KCB CBE
- Born: 27 August 1948 (age 78); Dundee, Scotland
- Military career
- Allegiance: United Kingdom
- Branch: British Army
- Service years: 1970–2005
- Rank: Lieutenant General
- Service number: 490103
- Unit: Black Watch
- Commands: Headquarters Northern Ireland (2000–2003); Royal Military College of Science (1996–1999); 39 Infantry Brigade (1992–1994); 1st Battalion, Black Watch (1985–1987)
- Conflicts: Operation Banner
- Awards: Knight Commander of the Order of the Bath; Commander of the Order of the British Empire; Mentioned in Despatches

Lieutenant General Sir Alistair Stuart Hastings Irwin, KCB, CBE (born 27 August 1948) is a retired British Army officer and a former Adjutant-General to the Forces.

== Early life ==
Irwin was born on 27 August 1948 in Dundee, Scotland. He was educated at Lambrook preparatory school, Wellington College and the University of St Andrews, graduating in Political Economy.

== Military career ==
After university, Irwin was commissioned into the Black Watch as a second lieutenant (on probation) on 10 August 1970. On 16 February 1971, his commission was confirmed with seniority from 25 July 1969. He was promoted to lieutenant on 25 January 1971, to captain on 25 July 1975, and to major on 30 September 1980.

In 1981, Irwin was posted to the Ministry of Defence as General Staff Officer II (Weapons). He was second in command of the 1st Battalion, The Black Watch from 1983 to 1984. On 30 June 1985, he was promoted to lieutenant colonel. That year, he returned to Ministry of Defence and joined the Directorate of Command Control and Communications Systems (Army). He was next appointed commanding officer of the 1st Battalion, Black Watch in 1985. He was Mentioned in Despatches on 14 April 1987 "in recognition of gallant and distinguished service in Northern Ireland", and appointed an Officer of the Order of the British Empire in the 1987 Birthday Honours. He commanded 39 Infantry Brigade in Northern Ireland from 1992 to 1994, and was advanced to Commander of the Order of the British Empire on 22 November 1994 "in recognition of gallant and distinguished services in Northern Ireland during the period 1st October 1993 to 31st March 1994".

In 1999, Irwin became Military Secretary. He served as General Officer Commanding Northern Ireland from December 2000 to January 2003, when he was appointed Adjutant-General to the Forces, a post he held until he retired in June 2005. As Adjutant-General, he strongly defended the Future Army Structure, particularly the creation of the Royal Regiment of Scotland from the regiments of the Scottish Division. He was knighted as a Knight Commander of the Order of the Bath in the 2002 Birthday Honours.

== Later life ==
Irwin is President of the Royal British Legion for Scotland. He is a member of the advisory board of anti-independence group Scotland in Union. He was an officer in the Royal Company of Archers until 2024.

Military offices
| Preceded by David Jenkins | Commandant of the Royal Military College of Science; 1996–1999 | Succeeded by John Sutherell |
| Preceded by David Burden | Military Secretary; 1999−2000 | Succeeded by Peter Grant Peterkin |
| Preceded by Sir Hew Pike | GOC British Army in Northern Ireland; 2000–2003 | Succeeded by Sir Philip Trousdell |
| Preceded by Sir Timothy Granville-Chapman | Adjutant General; 2003–2005 | Succeeded by Sir Freddie Viggers |
