= David Burden =

British Army general

Major General David Burden CB CVO CBE
- Born: 14 July 1943 (age 83)
- Military career
- Allegiance: United Kingdom
- Branch: British Army
- Service years: 1964–1999
- Rank: Major General
- Service number: 476891
- Units: Royal Army Service Corps; Royal Army Ordnance Corps; Royal Logistic Corps
- Conflicts: Operation Banner; United Nations Peacekeeping Force in Cyprus
- Awards: Companion of the Order of the Bath; Commander of the Royal Victorian Order; Commander of the Order of the British Empire

Major General David Leslie Burden, CB, CVO, CBE (born 14 July 1943) is a former British Army officer who served as military secretary from 1997 to 1999, and Receiver General of Westminster Abbey.

== Military career ==
Burden was educated at Portsmouth Grammar School and commissioned into the Royal Army Service Corps in 1964. He was posted to Germany and to Northern Ireland and transferred to the Royal Army Ordnance Corps under the McLeod Reorganisation of Army Logistics in 1965. He attended the Army Staff College in 1975, the National Defence College in 1981 and the Royal College of Defence Studies in 1988.

In the mid- to late 1970s Burden twice served in the Ministry of Defence and undertook two tours with the Allied Command Mobile Force Land, one in the headquarters and one in command of a logistic company. In 1981 he became chief personnel and logistic officer for the United Nations Peacekeeping Force in Cyprus and in 1983 he became commanding officer of the ordnance battalion for 1st Armoured Division. In 1985 he was made deputy chief of staff at Headquarters British Forces Hong Kong, and in 1989 he became assistant chief of staff at Headquarters British Army of the Rhine. In 1991 he became director general resettlement in the Ministry of Defence and in 1992 he became the first director general of the Royal Logistic Corps. In 1997 he was appointed military secretary.

On retirement from the Army Burden served as receiver general of Westminster Abbey from 1998 until 2008.

== Family ==
Burden is married to Susan and they have two daughters.

Military offices
Preceded by Michael Scott	Military Secretary; 1997–1999	Succeeded by Alistair Irwin
