= 5th Marine Battalion (Argentina) =

Argentine military unit

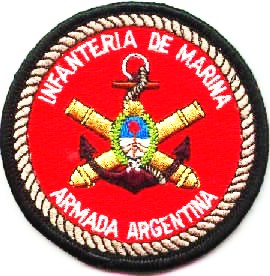
IMARA insignia

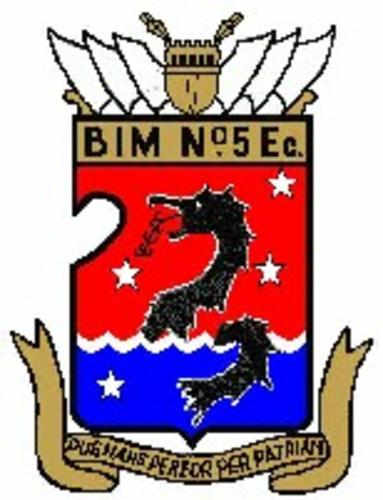
BIM 5 insignia

The 5th Marine Battalion (Spanish Batallón de Infantería de Marina 5, abbreviated to BIM-5) is a battalion of the Argentine Marines.

== Current ==
Today BIM-5, together with the 4th Marine Battalion (BIM-4), is based at Río Grande, Tierra del Fuego Province as part of the Argentine Navy's Fuerza de Infantería de Marina Austral (Southern Marine Corps Force, FAIA), formerly Fuerza de Infantería de Marina N°1 (First Marine Force, FIM1). They started the "Black Beret" tradition from a design made by Marine Sub-Lieutenant (naval rank equivalent to army Sub-Lieutenant) Abelardo "Tigre" (Tiger) Terré at the beginning of 1977, with the Marine Commander Manuel Tomé as its CO. After a Mountain and Cold Weather commando fighting course, they were dubbed the Aguilas Australes (Southern Eagles) and wore a black beret with a silver flash. Later on, the flash was changed to the unit's crest, and the use of the beret spread throughout FIM1 and FAIA. The Original "Aguilas Australes" flash is currently the semi-official logo of the Rio Grande Marine Garrison (Agrupación IM Río Grande).

== History ==
=== Operation Soberanía ===
At 20:00 on 22 December 1978 a task force of the Argentine Navy and the Argentine Marines ( Batallón N° 5 ) under the command of Humberto José Barbuzzi would seize the islands Horn, Freycinet, Hershell, Deceit, and Wollaston. On D-day, a severe storm impeded Argentine operations in the disputed area.

=== Falklands War and Battle of Mount Tumbledown ===
Commanded by Marine Commander Carlos H. Robacio, BIM-5 took part in the defence of Mount Tumbledown in the 1982 Falklands War. Although made up of conscripts, the unit's core of highly-professional NCOs and commissioned officers, along with a well-developed training and logistics system, rendered BIM-5 a tough unit that fought well in defense during the Battle of Mount Tumbledown. Different Argentine authorities have repeatedly decorated BIM-5's colors, with the French government awarding Marine Admiral Robacio the French Légion d'Honneur and the Argentine government awarding him the Argentine Nation to the Valour in Combat Medal.

Mount Tumbledown, Mount William, and Sapper Hill lie west of Stanley. They were held by BIM-5, a reinforced, cold weather trained and equipped, marine battalion. During preparations for movement to the Falklands, the Marine battalion was brought up to full strength of a light brigade with a company of the amphibious engineer company and a battery of the 1st Marine Artillery Regiment. The 5th Marines were further strengthened by three Tigercat SAM/Hispano-Suiza 35mm batteries of the 1st Marine Anti-Aircraft Regiment, deployed along Stanley harbor, and a heavy machine-gun company of the Headquarters Battalion.

The BIM-5 positions around Port Stanley were bombarded, both from the sea by naval gunfire and from the air by the Royal Air Force Harriers. On 1 May, Private Daniel Cabiglioli from M Company was killed during the Royal Navy bombardment of Sapper Hill. At 4.30 p.m., on 7 June 1982, a British Harrier bombing positions held by the 5th Marine Battalion was reportedly hit by concentrated fire from M Company (under Marine Sub-Lieutenant Rodolfo Cionchi) on Sapper Hill. According to Private José Luis Fazio:

My companions from M Company opened fire on a Sea Harrier, with rifles. They had been waiting for it, it had passed several times through a sort of air corridor to the airport. They fired all around it so that it would run into the bullets, it tilted, began to smoke and was lost at sea. We felt a big explosion.

There were no British aircraft lost on 7 June.

12 June proved to be the toughest day for the Argentine Marines. From the moment the 2nd Battalion Scots Guards had finally been moved to Goat Ridge by helicopter, 1,500 rounds of artillery, descended upon the Marines, in preparation for the coming infantry assault. At the same time 3 PARA on Mount Longdon came under heavy and accurate fire that killed four Paras and one REME craftsman and wounded seven Paratroopers in the shelling that was directed by Sub-Lieutenant Marcelo de Marco, the artillery officer of the 5th Marines on Tumbledown Mountain.

On 13 June a diversionary action was fought to the northeast to raid the Cortley Ridge fuel dump. The 101st Anti-Aircraft Artillery Group's B Battery (B/GADA101) was assigned to defend the Fresinet Peninsula, a long, narrow piece of land running from Moody Brook to form the northern arm of Stanley, when their troops came under attack at 11 p.m. The incursion was carried out by the SAS and SBS in four rigid raiders. They were engaged by Lieutenant Héctor Gazzolo's platoon of Marines with automatic weapons, resulting in three British wounded and the loss of all the landing crafts involved as John Parker reveals in SBS: The Inside Story of The Special Boat Service (Hachette, 2013):

A six-man team from 3 SBS ... with D and G Squadrons, SAS, with the object of creating a diversionary assault from the sea ... were to move across the Murrell River by four fast power-boats ... The raiders had no option but to withdraw. One of the RRCs was badly damaged and limped back on hardly any power. The coxswain steered her by the hospital-ship for a shield and the boat died on them just as they reached the water's edge. Another sank just offshore, but close enough for the team to swim to safety ... An SBS corporal and two SAS troopers were wounded ... The RRCs were riddled with holes and had to be destroyed.

Further south, the action was initiated shortly after 8 p.m., as the 2nd Scots Guards' Reconnaissance Platoon carried out a diversionary attack, advancing with four Blues and Royals Scorpion light tanks. As the British tanks came into range of the 5th Marine Battalion's O Coy (O/BIM5), one of the Scorpion tanks was incapacitated by a booby-trap. In a firefight that lasted two hours, three Marines were killed (Marine Conscripts Omar Iniguez, Omar Patrone, and Juan Rava). Marine First Class Private José Luis Fazio fought against the British diversionary force:

At about 2230 hours our battalion had its first intensive gun battle with British companies which appeared out of nowhere. I heard Private Roberto Barboza yell 'The English are here!' ... I remember our Operations Officer requested the artillery to assist at 23.00 with star shells. The close-quarter battle was such that the Argentine artillery was unable to drop shells onto the British attackers. I was shooting, doing my work. I don't know if I killed anyone. We just fired our rifles, that's all. Contact was maintained for over an hour before battalion headquarters ordered Obra Company to fall back ... What we did not realise at the time was that at least a wounded Marine made his way to the amphibious engineer platoon position and hurled a grenade wounding a Major. Simultaneously the Major opened fire, killing him. (Nick van der Bijl, Victory in the Falklands, p.199, Pen and Sword, 2007)

The Guards decided to fall back towards the south but entered a minefield and were caught in a crossfire from the Mortar Platoon under Sergeant Elbio Cuñe on Mount William and the Marines' artillery. BIM-5 coordinated fire support from Bravo Battery of the 1st Marine Field Artillery Battalion (B/BIAC) and also guns of the Argentine Army's 3rd and 4th (Airborne) Artillery Groups (G.A.3/G.A.Aerot.4). The Guards sustained twelve casualties. At about 1.30 a.m. on 14 June, the commander of the 5th Marines ordered O Company of the Marines, to withdraw in order to stand in reserve. O Coy's rest in reserve was short lived and in the early hours of 14 June the platoon commanders were instructed to put the platoons on one hour's notice to move.

Meanwhile, to the north of Mount William, Marine Sub-Lieutenant Eduardo Villarraza's N Company of the 5th Marines (N/BIM5) occupied Mount Tumbledown. At 10.30 p.m., they were attacked from Goat Ridge by 2nd Scots Guards. About 300 metres from the first Argentine position, the Marines opened fire with MAG machine-guns and FAL rifles. Both British forward platoons started to take casualties and the Scots Guards retreated to the western rocks and reorganized themselves. Argentine shells began landing among the Guards but by 2.30 a.m., part of the high ground was in British hands and the situation of the Argentine forces became uncertain. In the centre of the mountain, one Scots Guards platoon managed to secure a small piece of high ground, where they were able to set up a fire base that pinned down several Marine positions for the remaining five hours of the battle. Commander Robacio ordered Marine Sub-Lieutenant Eduardo Villarraza to send a fighting patrol to deal with the fire base. Marine Sub-Lieutenant Hector Miño with 5th Platoon accompanied by Second Lieutenant Augusto La Madrid (Argentine Army) with 3rd Platoon. Meanwhile, members of the Marine N Company (N/BIM5) were ordered to remain under cover during a bombardment by Argentine artillery. However, using the cover of British artillery, the Scots Guards advanced upon the Argentine positions. Marine Private Jorge Sanchez, in the book 5th Infantry Brigade in the Falklands (Leo Cooper, 2003), recalled:

The fighting was sporadic, but at times fierce, as we tried to maintain our position. By this time we had ten or twelve dead including one officer [Second Lieutenant Oscar Silva, Argentine Army]. I hadn't fired directly at a British soldier, as they had been too hard to get a clear shot at. I can remember lying there with all this firing going over my head. They were everywhere. The platoon commander [Marine Sub-Lieutenant Carlos Daniel Vazquez] then called Private Ramon Rotela manning the 60 millimetre mortar and Rotela fired it straight up into the air so that the bombs landed on ourselves. At this point I had been up and in actual combat for over six hours. It was snowing and we were tired. Some of the guys had surrendered, but I didn't want to do this. I had only twenty rounds left and I decided to continue the fight from Mount William. I popped up, fired a rifle grenade in the direction of 8 to 10 British soldiers to keep their heads down, and then ran for the 2nd Platoon. I can remember saying some type of prayer hoping the British wouldn't shoot me in the back.

Two Argentine platoons (Second Lieutenant La Madrid and Marine Sub-Lieutenant Miño) on the eastern of Tumbledown counter-attacked resulting in further British casualties but were outmanoeuvred by the Scots Guards. During this action Miño was wounded but refused medical assistance until all the wounded men received medical attention.

The fall of Wireless Ridge and the heavy expenditure of artillery, mortar and machine-gun ammunition in support of the 7th Infantry Regiment (RI7) on the ridgeline overlooking Moody Brook rendered the situation of the Marines tenuous.

Using armour-infantry-co-operation the 2nd Battalion the Parachute Regiment had advanced through the RI7 companies. O Company, BIM-5 (O/BIM5) had been sent up to the Moody Brook area and moved into blocking positions to the south and east of Moody Brook. In due course firing broke out in the direction of Battalion HQ at Moody Brook, indicating that the British had outflanked their position. At 7 a.m., the Commanding Officer of the 5th Marines reported his command post near Moody Brook had come under enemy fire from Wireless Ridge. By dawn the approach of the Gurkhas, advancing to secure Mount William was detected.

As the Marine commanders on Tumbledown and Mount William awaited reinforcements, they received orders to withdraw. Ignoring these orders, the Marines continued to resist. By 9 a.m., the Marines had again been ordered to withdraw. Around eight RI 6 personnel were killed and eighteen captured, many of them wounded but the 5th Marine Battalion's N Coy (N/BIM5) on Tumbledown and William carried out an orderly withdrawal to Sapper Hill. The 6th Regiment's B Coy (B/RI6) also successfully withdrew with its portable weapons to set up new defensive positions around Sapper Hill. Five of the Marine platoon positions now fell to the British. Lt.-Col. Morgan's 1st Battalion of the 7th Gurkhas took Mount William unopposed and his men were bitterly disappointed.

By 10.a.m. the 5th Marine Battalion's position had stabilized. The Argentine commanding officer, Marine Commander Robacio and the RI 6 Officer involved, Major Jaimet were determined to continue fighting. In the battle report Marine Commander Robacio wrote:

I was convinced that we could still resist, and that is why I ordered the O Company - which was ready - to begin a counter-attack together with the M Company. I planned to direct this attack myself personally. (Marine Rear Admiral Carlos Büsser, El BIM 5 en las Malvinas, Boletin del Centro Naval, pp. 318–319).

Generals Mario Benjamin Menendez (the commander of the Argentine garrison) and Oscar Jofre (commander of the 10th Brigade, responsible for the defence of Stanley), following a quick conference, agreed that to continue resistance would entail senseless loss of life. By 1 p.m., the 5th Marines had initiated their withdrawal, after destroying their vehicles and heavy equipment. Minutes later Marine Midshipman (naval rank equivalent to second lieutenant) Alejandro Koch's 3rd Platoon, M Coy (M/BIM5) covering the withdrawal of the Marine battalion were attacked by C Company of 40 Commando (C/40 Cdo.) landing from Sea King helicopters. (Hugh Bicheno "Razor's Edge" pg. 314)

Three Argentine Marines (Marine Conscripts Roberto Leyes, Eleodoro Monzon and Sergio Robledo) from Koch's platoon were killed covering the last withdrawal. Marine Midshipman Marcelo Davis's 1st Platoon from M/BIM 5 attempted a counterattack but were beaten back.

Two Sea Kings sustained extensive small arms damage but remained operational. Two Royal Marine Commandos were shot in the action. Two more Royal Marines, 2nd Lt. Paul Allen and Marine Wayne McGregor, trod on mines and Major Brian Armitage was badly injured when a Volvo BV-202 tracked vehicle ran over an anti-tank mine planted in the Sapper Hill sector. "We ran over a mine. I went up through the roof and the vehicle went up and was turned right round by the explosion," recalled Major Armitage.

Marine Commander Robacio, commanding the Marine battalion, spoke to British journalists after the war and said:

At about seven o'clock I received the order to withdraw prior to a surrender. Our military code states that for an Argentine military unit to surrender it must have spent all its ammunition or lost at least two-thirds of its men. It was awful to have to ask the units which were still fighting to withdraw.
