= Nicolás Kasanzew =

Argentinian journalist

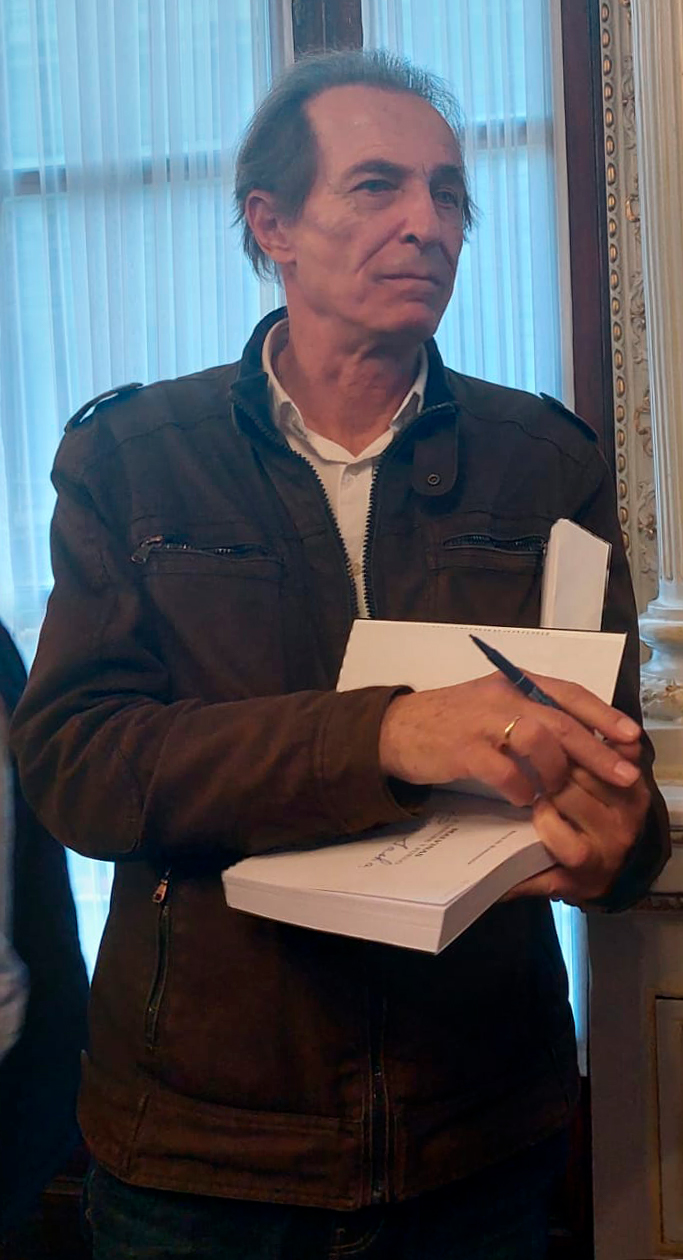
- Born: May 31, 1948 (age 78); Salzburg, Austria
- Occupations: Journalist; author
- Years active: 1970–present
- Known for: Falklands War war argentine correspondent

Nicolás Kasanzew (Nikolai Leonidovich Kazantsev, Russian: Николай Леонидович Казанцев; born 31 May 1948) is an Austrian-born Argentine journalist and writer of Russian origin.

== Biography ==
He was born in Salzburg to Russian parents with the name Nikholai Leonidovich Kazantsev, where he was born with his family in a camp of refugees Parsch. He emigrated to Argentina with his family when he was five years old.

He started his career as journalist in La Nación newspaper, and then in the magazine Siete Días. In the 70's he started to be known as a political journalist and got programs and segments in the TV-owned broadcast Argentina Televisora Color.

He was the only Argentine journalist to be allowed to be during the wartime on the Falklands War. He was known at that time for conduct the interviews and the daily informs for Argentina Televisora Color. After the Falklands he was criticized for his coverage of the war and disappeared from media due the "desmalvinización". In the present, he is still making courses and articles defending the war actions of the Argentine troops.

In the 90's he decided to move to United States to work in Miami for Spanish-speaking American media like Telemundo and Unimedia. He was producer of CBS Overnight News.

After the Argentine surrender he wrote many books and articles about the Falklands War and his experiences. In 2018 he published Las claves del verdadero amor, a romance novel.

In February 2024 he was appointed as Director of Malvinas (Falklands) Office of the Argentine Senate by Victoria Villarruel.
