= Stanley Harbour =

Inlet in the Falkland Islands

Coordinates: 51°41′15″S 57°50′15″W

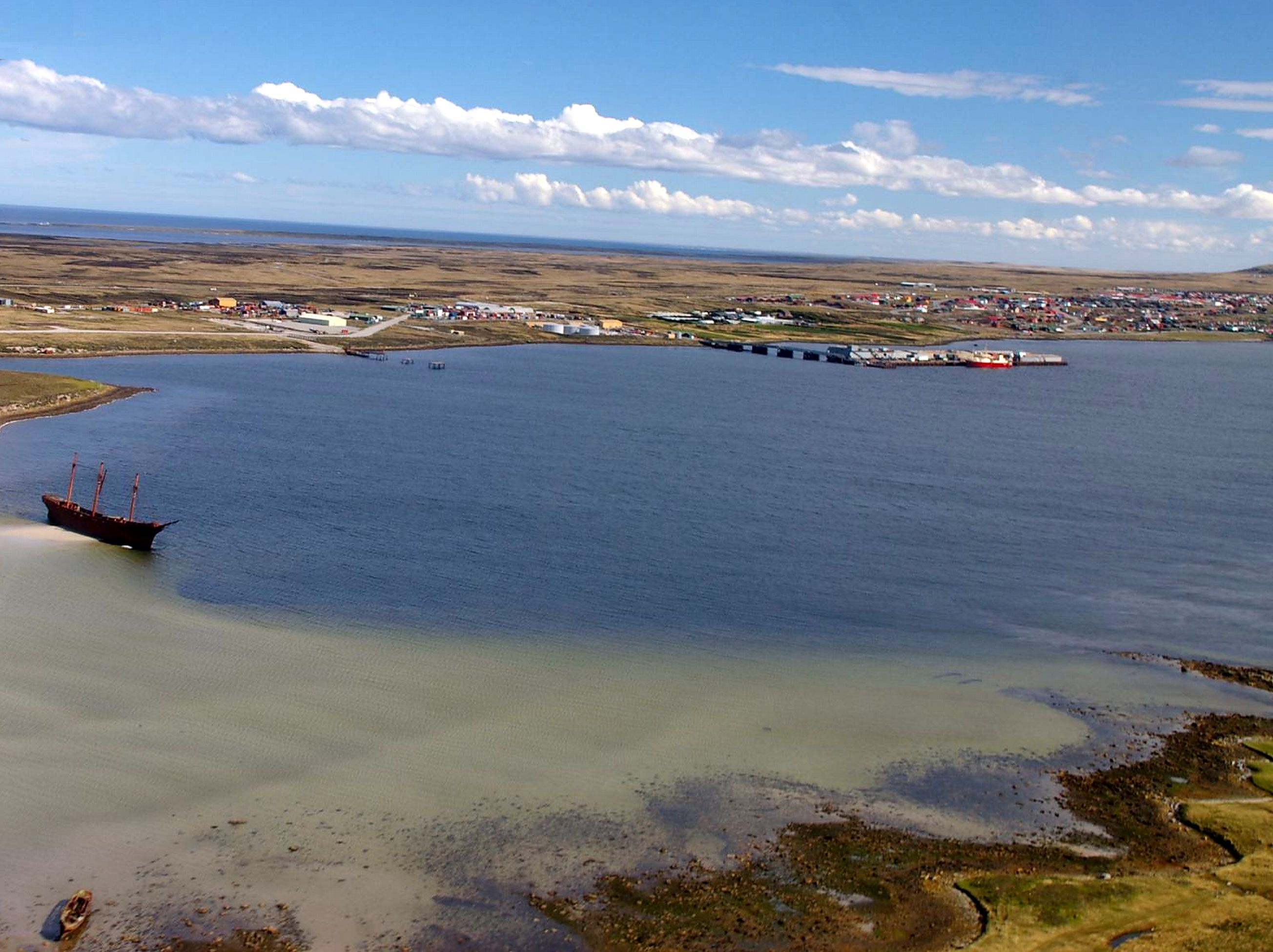
Stanley Harbour from the air, with the hulk of Lady Elizabeth in the left foreground

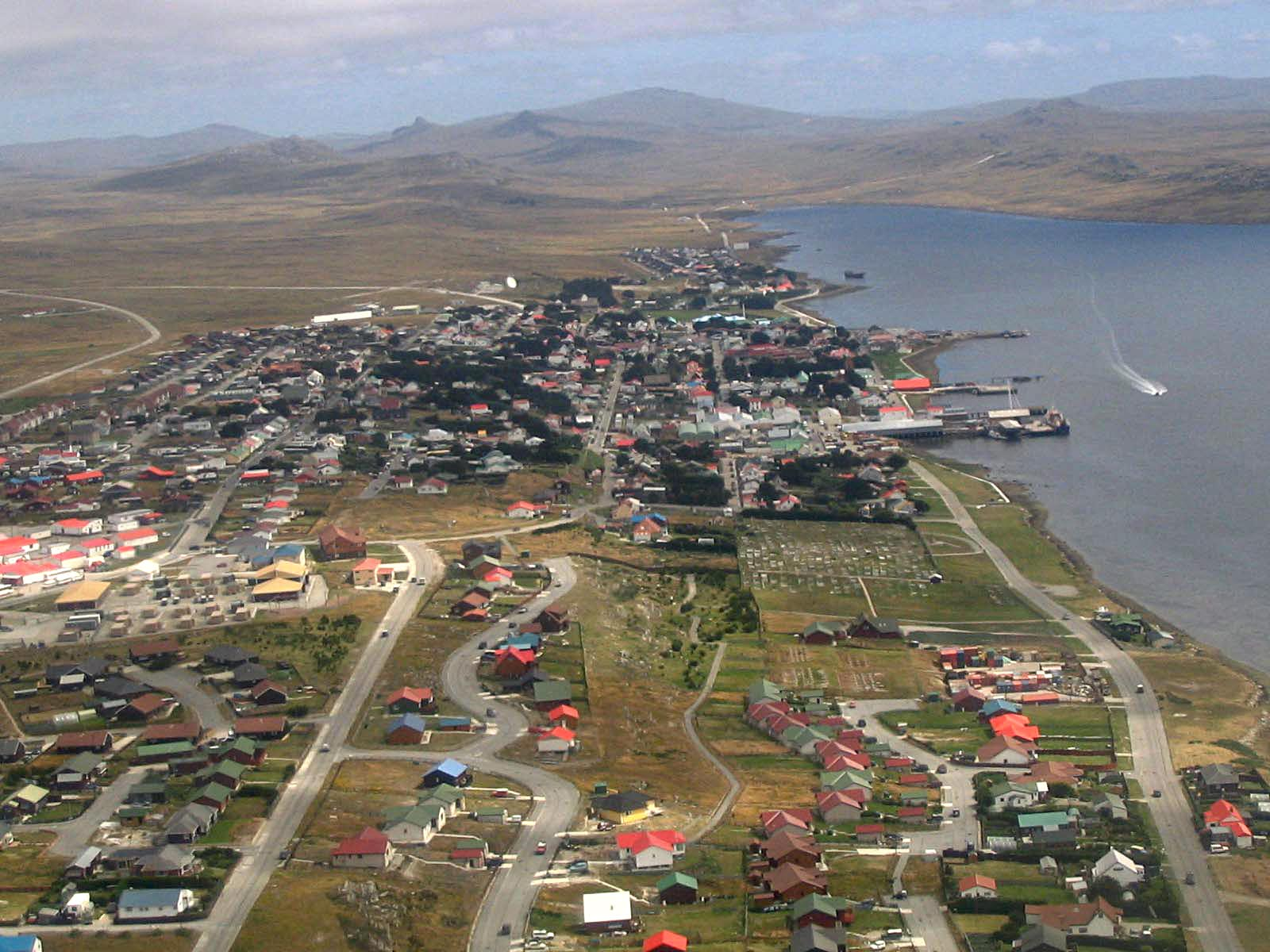
Stanley Harbour and the town, from the air

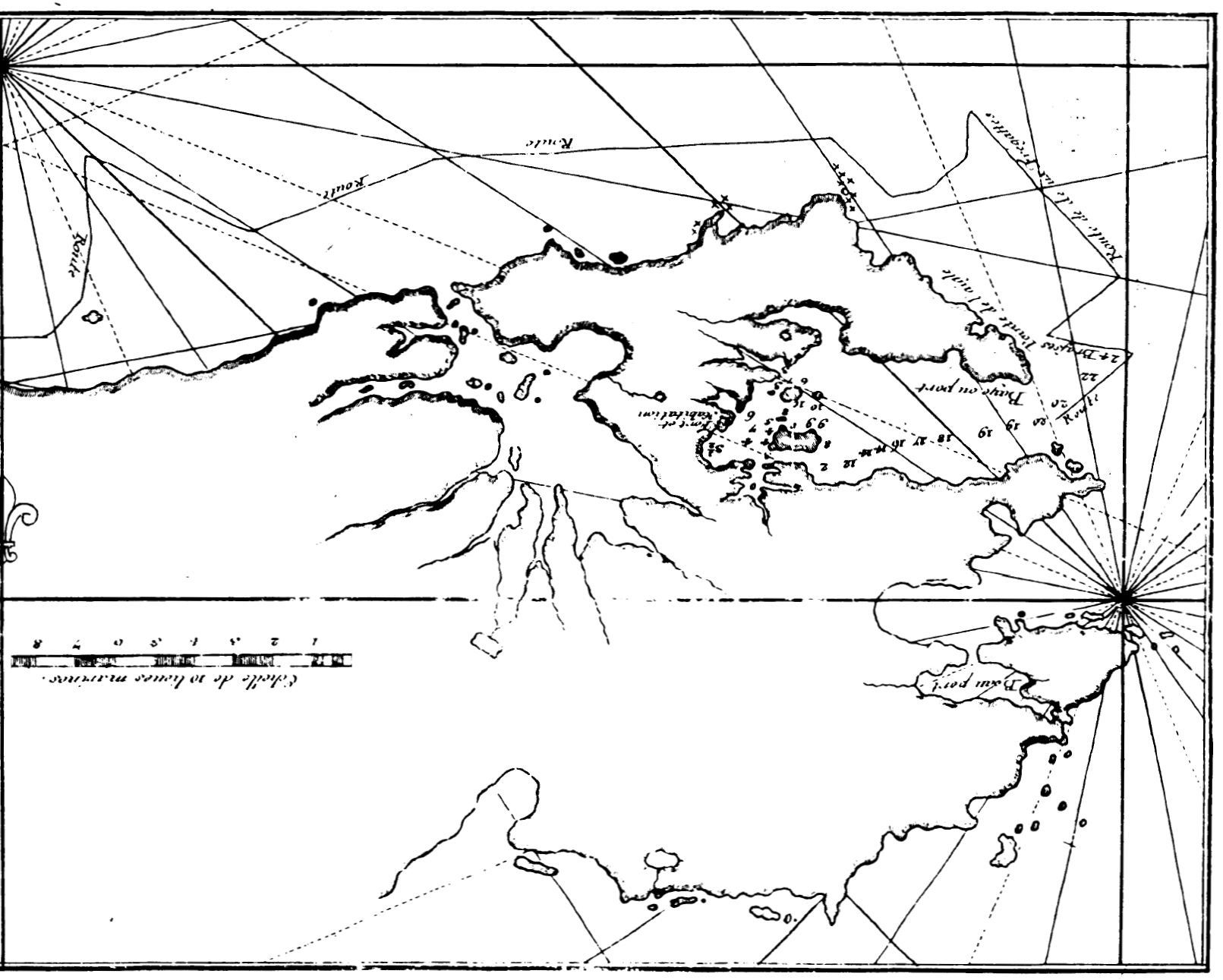
Early mapping of Stanley Harbour (Dom Pernety, 1769)

Stanley Harbour is a large inlet on the east coast of East Falkland island. A strait called "the Narrows" leads into Port William.

It serves the town of the same name – Stanley – as a harbour. Stanley has sprawled along the south shore of the harbour, to gain shelter from the low hill of Stanley Common. As such this is the busiest waterway of the Falkland Islands and frequently visited by cruise ships, freighters and navy vessels, although this has lessened since the building of the two airports at RAF Mount Pleasant and Port Stanley Airport. It was formerly, and still is to some extent, a repair yard for vessels damaged in South Atlantic storms, or needing to restock.

== Geography ==
The peninsula on which Canopus Hill, Port Stanley Airport and Gypsy Cove lie, together with a narrow spit of land known as Navy Point, effectively divides Port William from Stanley Harbour. This in turn creates a small bay in Stanley Harbour known as the Canache, which is bridged at one end.

Stanley Harbour is effectively the enlarged estuary of Moody Brook, which flows into it at the west end. It was enlarged as the result of glacial action.

== Shipwrecks ==
Stanley Harbour has experienced a number of shipwrecks. The remains of the following can still be seen:

- Lady Elizabeth – at the east end, near the Canache, a three-masted freighter, which sank in 1913, after hitting a reef and limping into harbour.
- Jhelum – an East Indiaman, which sank in 1871, and was abandoned by its crew.
- Charles Cooper – an American packet which sank in 1866, used now as storage space by the Falkland Islands Company.

== History ==
=== Early history ===
Stanley Harbour was originally known as Beau Port (French), later Port Jackson, and has sometimes been known as "Port Stanley".

=== First World War ===
In December 1914, the harbour was the base for a British Squadron lying in wait for the German Far East Squadron led by Admiral Graf von Spee. The first shots of the battle were fired by HMS Canopus, which had been grounded in Stanley Harbour as a guardship. Her gunfire was directed from a low hill on the peninsula, henceforth called Canopus Hill.

=== Second World War ===
During the Battle of the River Plate in December 1939, the Graf Spee concentrated fire upon the Exeter inflicting some 40 direct hits and causing major damage. On the 16 December, Exeter limped into Stanley Harbour, with 60 of the 600 crew dead and 49 wounded. The crew had to be boarded out in Stanley as Exeter was too badly damaged.

=== Falklands War and after ===
In the aftermath of the Falklands War, Stanley Harbour was the departure point for many of the Argentine POWs being transported back to Argentina.

Due to the lack of accommodation, for a while, British troops were billetted on boats in the harbour. This continued until adequate provision was made elsewhere.

Due to the construction of a port at Mare Harbour, Stanley Harbour no longer deals with much military transport. Instead, it is mainly used as the main freight gateway to the islands, and is visited frequently by cruise ships.
