= Argentine Marines =

Maritime land warfare force of Argentina

Argentine Navy Infantry
- Infantería de Marina de la Armada de la República Argentina
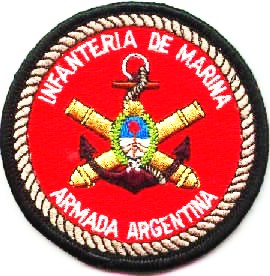
- Emblem of the Argentine Navy Infantry
- Active: 1807–present
- Country: Argentina
- Branch: Argentine Navy
- Type: Marines
- Role: Amphibious Warfare
- Size: 5,500
- Part of: Argentine Navy
- Mottos: PATRIAE SEMPER VIGILES (Always vigilant for the Fatherland)
- March: Marcha de la Infantería de Marina (Marine march)
- Anniversaries: 19 November 1879
- Website: argentina.gob.ar/imara

Commanders
- Current: Rear. Adm. Pedro Eugenio Galardi

The Naval Infantry Command (Spanish: Comando de la Infantería de Marina, COIM), also known as the Naval Infantry of the Navy of the Argentine Republic (Spanish: Infantería de Marina de la Armada de la República Argentina, IMARA) and generally referred to in English as the Argentine marines, are the amphibious warfare branch of the Argentine Navy and one of its four operational commands.

The Argentine marines trace their origins to the Spanish Naval Infantry, which took part in conflicts in South America in the eighteenth and nineteenth centuries. Argentine marines took part in various conflicts of the nineteenth and twentieth century, notably the War of the Triple Alliance and the Falklands War. The marines (represented by the 5th Naval Infantry Battalion) are considered to have been among the best Argentine combat units present in the Falklands. The most recent war in which Argentine naval infantry took part was the Gulf War of 1990.

Nowadays Argentine naval infantry are frequently deployed on UN peace-keeping missions.

== History ==
The Marines trace their origins in Spanish Naval Infantry, at the time of the Viceroyalty of the Río de la Plata. After the Argentine War of Independence, it was under joint administration of the Argentine Army and the Argentine Navy. A 1946 law placed the marines solely under the jurisdiction of the Navy.

=== List of conflicts involving Argentina Marines ===
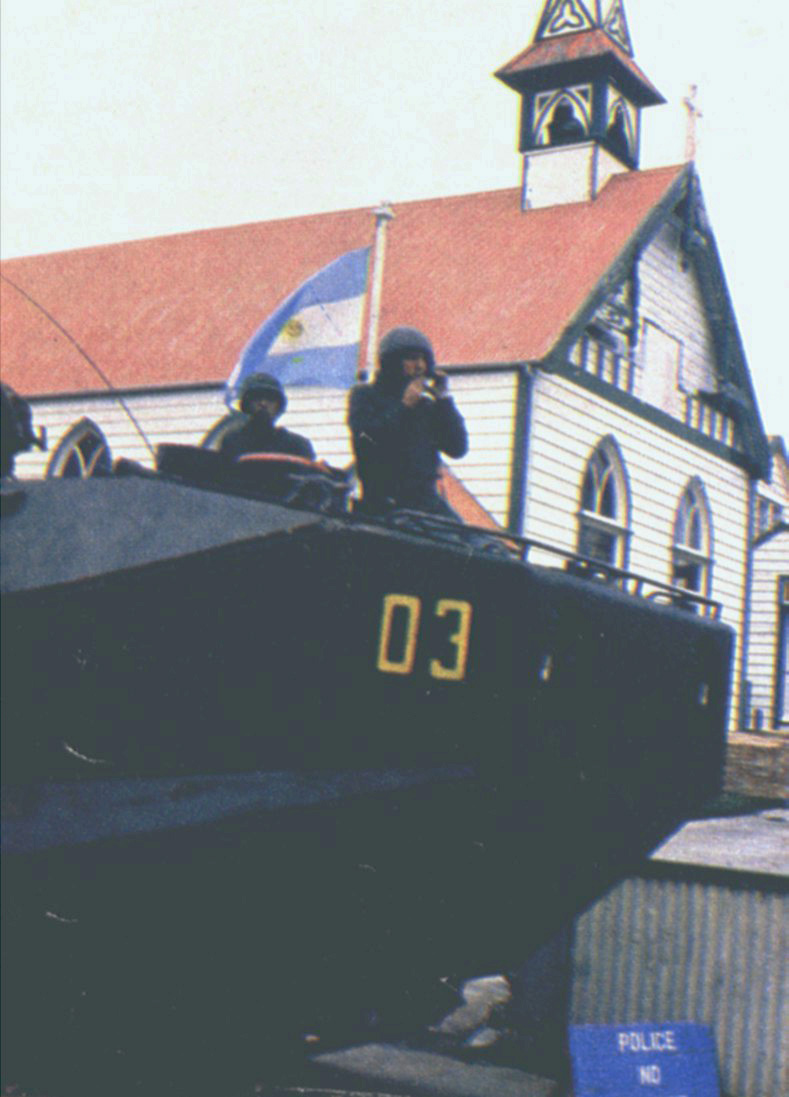
Argentine Marines using an Assault Amphibious Vehicle to patrol Port Stanley during the occupation of the Falkland Islands 1982.

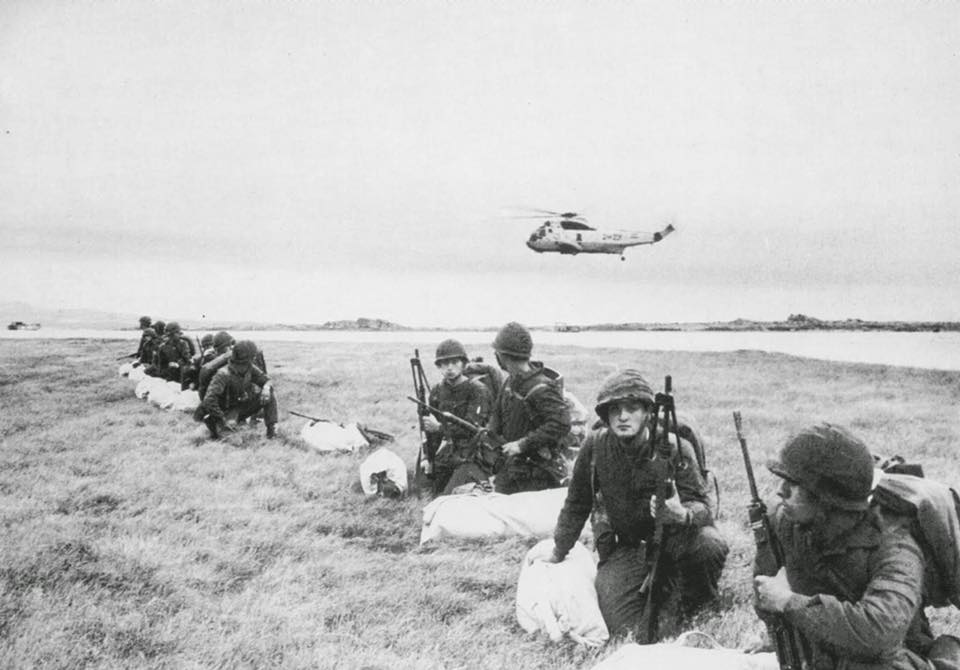
Argentine Marines during Operation Rosario, 1982.

Spanish rule

- Falklands Crisis of 1770.
- Spanish–Portuguese War (1776–1777).
- British invasions of the River Plate.

Independence

- Argentine War of Independence.

Argentine Confederation

- Cisplatine War.
- Uruguayan Civil War.
- Anglo-French blockade of the Río de la Plata.
- Paraguayan War.

Argentine Republic

- 1963 Argentine Navy revolt.
- Snipe incident.
- Dirty War.
- Falklands War.
  - 1982 invasion of the Falkland Islands.
  - Invasion of South Georgia.
  - Battle of Mount Tumbledown.
- Gulf War.
- United Nations peacekeeping.
  - United Nations Peacekeeping Force in Cyprus.
  - United Nations Protection Force.
  - United Nations Stabilisation Mission in Haiti.
  - United Nations Mission for the Referendum in Western Sahara.

=== Present ===
IMARA routinely train in joint exercises with similar units of Brazil, Chile and the United States. However, as of 2021 component battalions were reported to be at about 60 percent of their authorized strength levels due to lack of personnel and resources.

==== Current deployments ====
2009: Training on USS Oak Hill

IMARA had two companies as part of the Argentinian battalions in Cyprus (UNFICYP, 1992 to 2003) and Haiti (MINUSTAH, 2004 to 2015). The former remains as a platoon-size unit as a consequence of the missions downsizing, and the latter finished its tour in 2015. A small platoon was also deployed in Serbia/UN Province Kosovo (NATO KFOR mandate), attached to Argentine Engineers Company, which was in turn attached to the Italian Brigade.

A few marines officers are routinely deployed as military observers for the UN.

== Structure ==
Argentine Marines have the same rank insignia and titles as the rest of the Argentine Navy, and are trained in the same institutions for officers and NCOs. Until the 21st century the Marine Corps Basic School provided post-graduate officer and basic enlisted training.

=== Fleet Marine Force (FAIF) ===
The FMF was formerly called the Brigada de IM No. 1 (English: 1st Marine Brigade )

- 2nd Marine Corps Battalion
- 1st Amphibious Vehicles Battalion
- Amphibious Engineers Battalion
- Command and Logistical Support Battalion
- 1st Communications Battalion
- 1st Field Artillery Battalion
- Anti-aircraft artillery Battalion
- Amphibious Commandos Group (APCA)

=== Southern Marine Force (FAIA) ===
The SMF was formerly called the Fuerza de M No. 1. (English: 1st Marine Force)

- 4th Marine Corps Battalion
- 5th Marine Corps Battalion
- Naval Detachment Río Grande

=== River Operations Unit ===
- 3rd Marine Corps Battalion

=== Marine Security Forces ===
- Navy General Staff Security Battalion
- Puerto Belgrano Naval Base Security Battalion
- 15 Security Companies assigned to naval bases, Naval Air Stations, and Marine bases

== Ranks ==
Officers

Rank group	General / flag officers			Senior officers			Junior officers
Argentine Marines
Argentine Marines	Almirante IM	Vicealmirante IM	Contralmirante IM	Capitán de navío IM	Capitán de fragata IM	Capitán de corbeta IM	Teniente de navío IM	Teniente de fragata IM	Teniente de corbeta IM	Guardiamarina IM

Enlisted

Rank group	Senior NCOs					Junior NCOs		Enlisted
Argentine Marines
Argentine Marines	Suboficial mayor	Suboficial principal	Suboficial primero	Suboficial segundo	Cabo principal IM	Cabo primero IM	Cabo segundo IM	Infantería de Marina primero	Infantería de Marina segundo

== Equipment ==
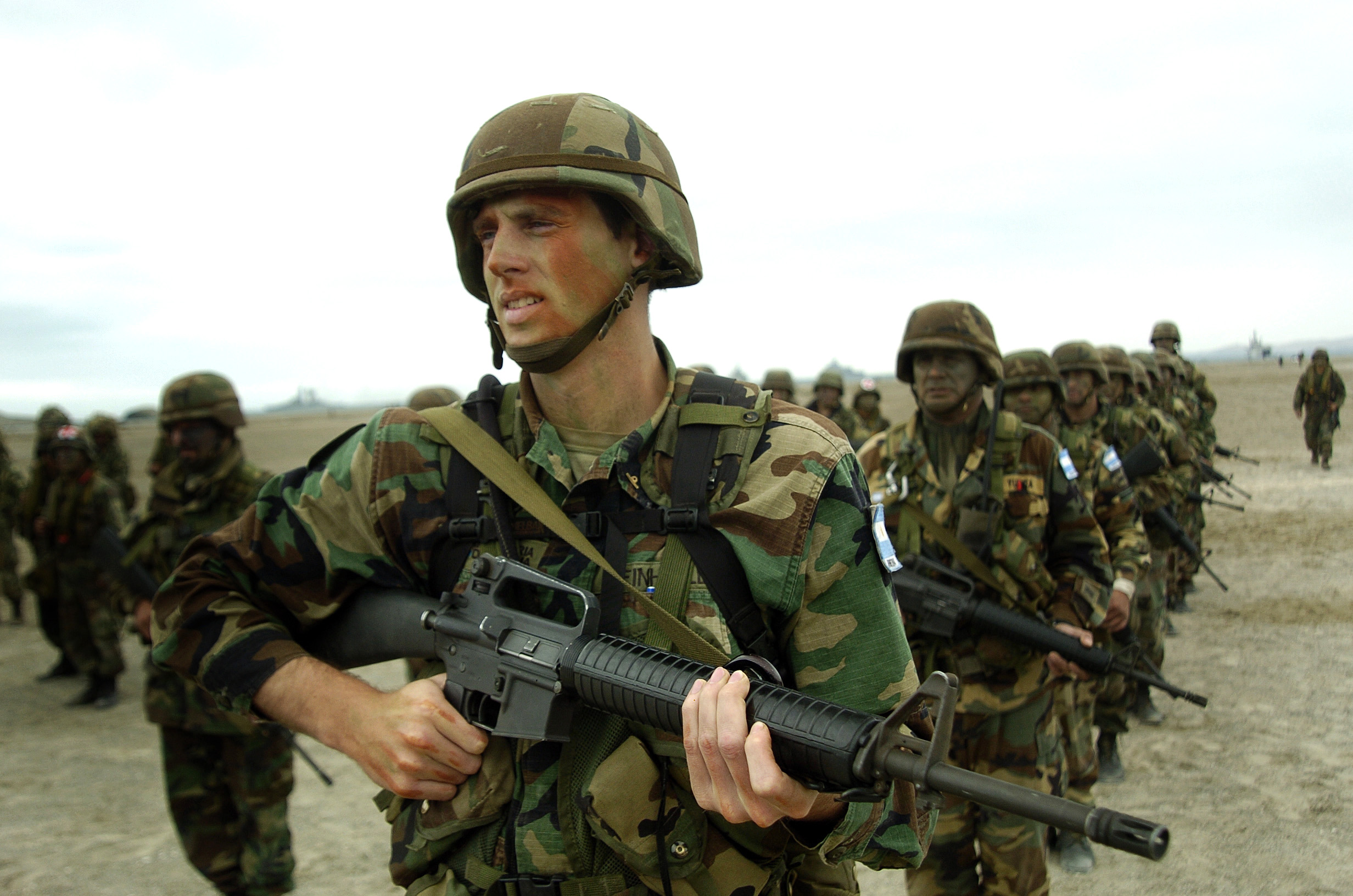
Marines from Argentina line up in formation alongside U.S. Marines during the largest amphibious assault exercise in Latin America, UNITAS 45-04

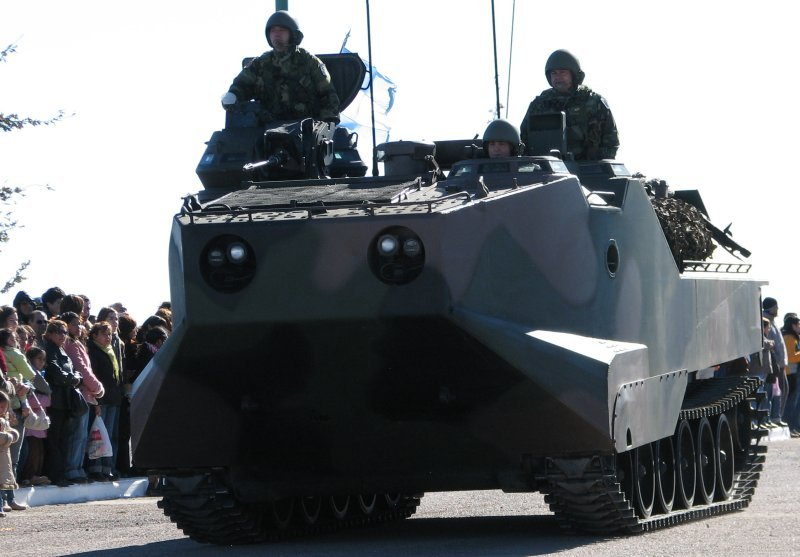
LVTP7 of the Argentine Marine Infantry (IMARA), locally known as VAO (Vehiculo Anfibio a Orugas)

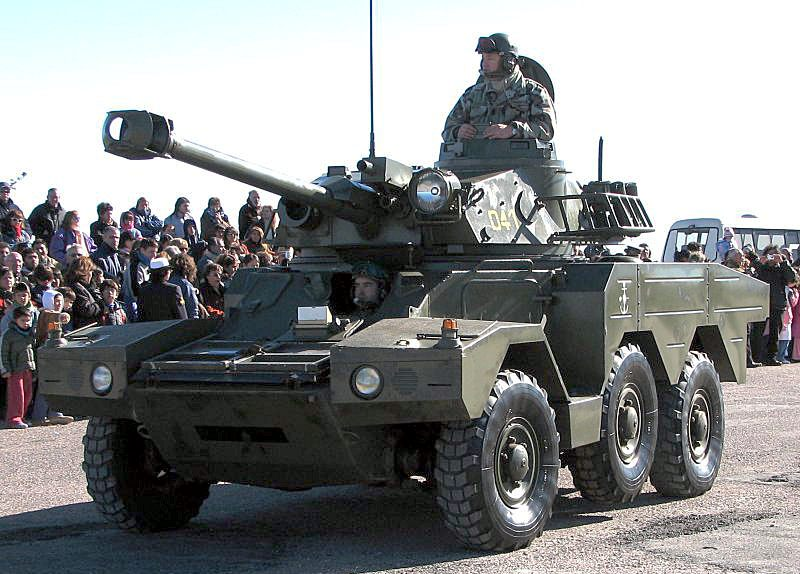
Panhard ERC 90 of the Argentine Marine Infantry (IMARA).

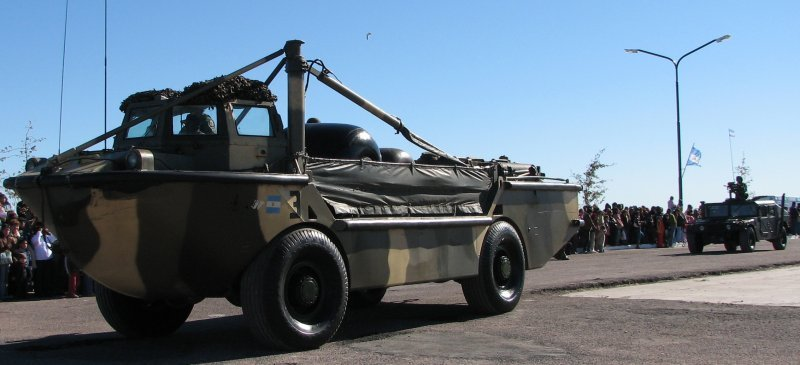
LARC-5 of the Argentine Marine Infantry (IMARA), locally known as VAR (Vehículo Anfibio a Ruedas); behind it, a Humvee.

== See also ==
- Argentine ground forces in the Falklands War
- Argentine Navy
- Marines
- Military history of Argentina
