= Moody Brook =

Watercourse in the Falkland Islands

Coordinates: 51.685678°S 57.923451°W

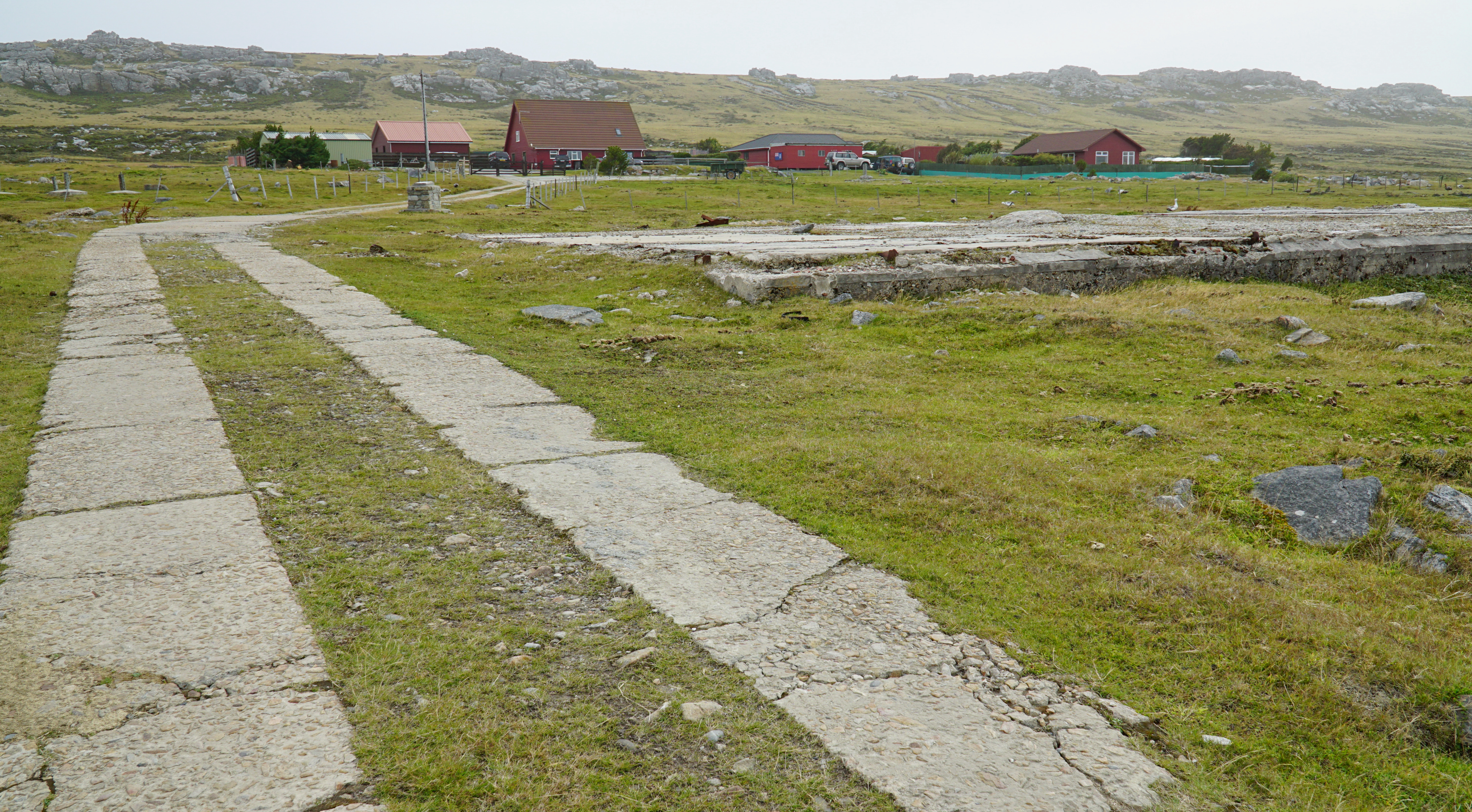
Site of Moody Brook Barracks, the island garrison for the Falklands. A small detachment of Royal Marines was stationed here from the 1960s until the invasion of 1982 when Argentine forces forcibly took the barracks and evicted the British troops. The barracks site is that of the old wireless station. Only foundations remain today.

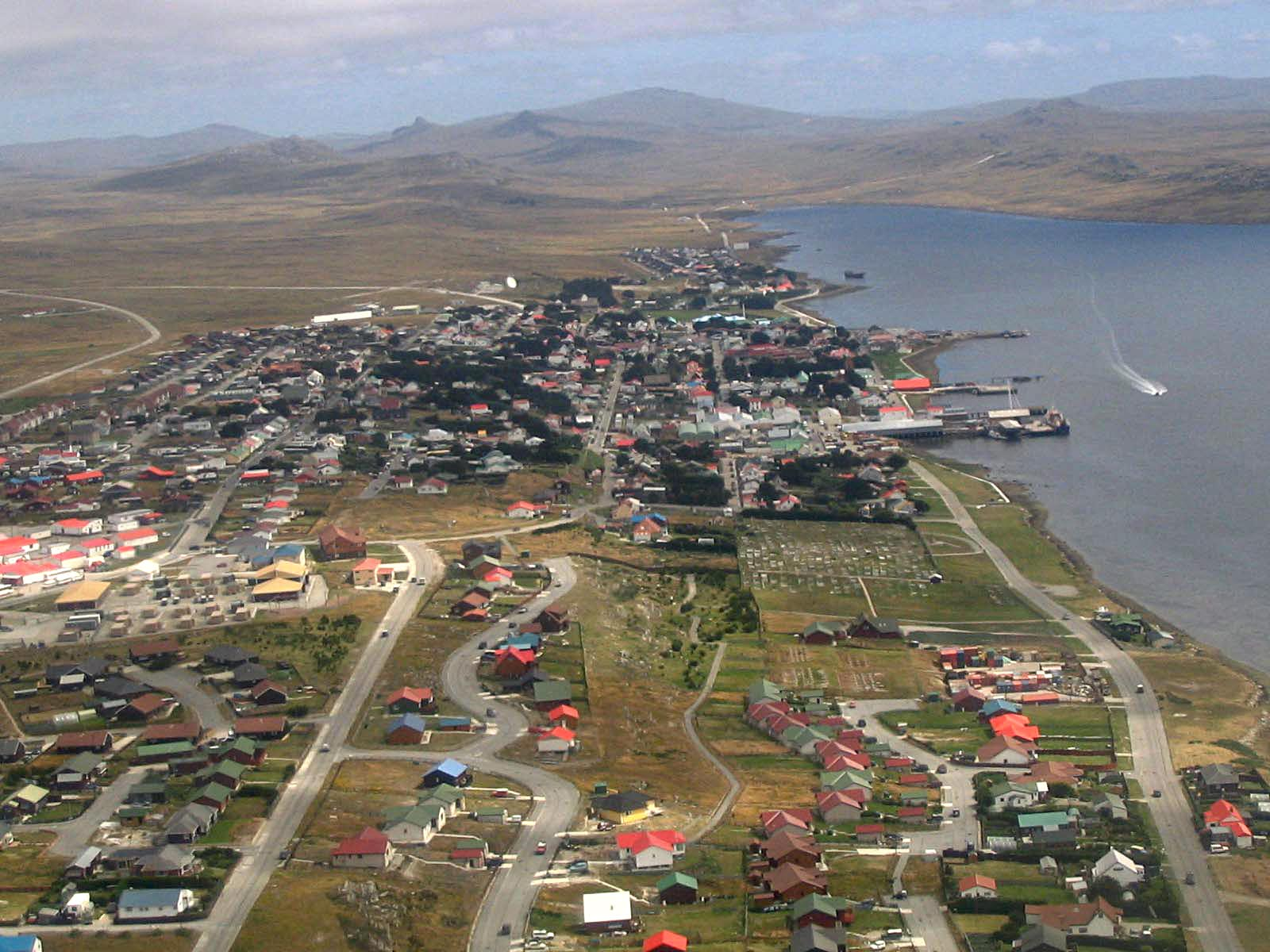
Stanley Harbour and the town, from the air. Moody Brook can just be seen in the distance

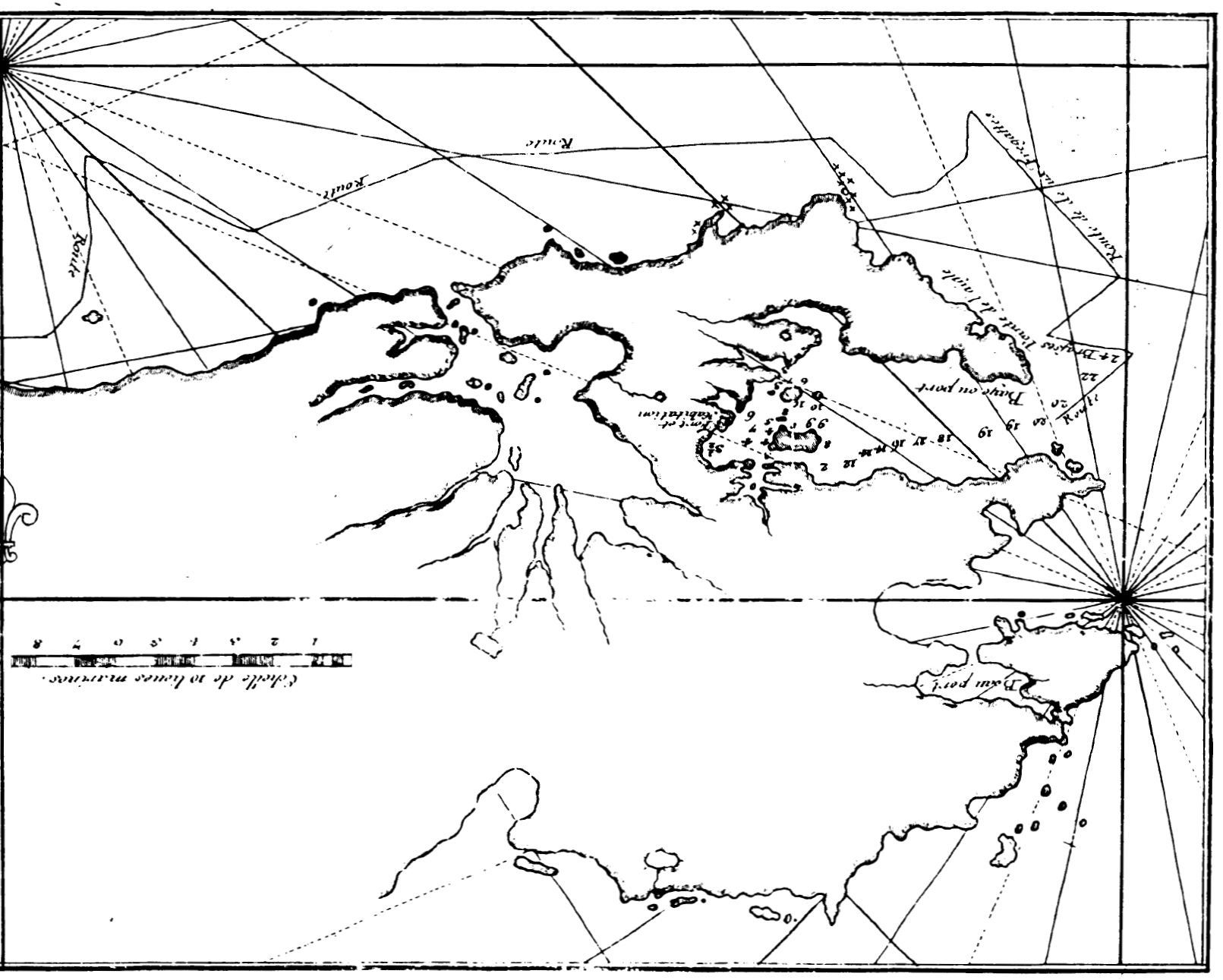
Early mapping of Moody Brook (Dom Pernety, 1769)

Moody Brook is a small watercourse that flows into Stanley Harbour on East Falkland, Falkland Islands. It is near Stanley, just to the northwest, and was formerly the location of the town barracks, which were attacked in Operation Rosario, the 1982 Argentine Invasion of the Falkland Islands.

It is named after Governor Richard Moody.

== Attack on Moody Brook barracks ==
Giachino's party had the shortest distance to go: two and a half miles due north. Moody Brook Barracks, the destination of the main party, was six miles away, over rough Falklands terrain. Lieutenant-Commander Sanchez-Sabarots, in the book The Argentine Fight for The Falklands, describes the main party's progress in the dark:

- It was a nice night, with a moon, but the cloud covered the moon for most of the time.... It was very hard going with our heavy loads; it was hot work. We eventually became split up into three groups. We only had one night sight; the lead man, Lieutenant Arias had it. One of the groups became separated when a vehicle came along the track we had to cross. We thought it was a military patrol. Another group lost contact, and the third separation was caused by someone going too fast. This caused my second in command, Lieutenant Bardi, to fall. He suffered a hairline fracture of the ankle and had to be left behind with a man to help him. … We were at Moody Brook by 5.30 a.m., just on the limits of the time planned, but with no time for the one hour's reconnaissance for which we had hoped.

The main party of Argentine Marines assumed that the Moody Brook Barracks contained sleeping Royal Marines. The barracks were quiet, although a light was on in the office of the Royal Marine commander. No sentries were observed, and it was a quiet night, apart from the occasional animal call. Lieutenant-Commander Sanchez-Sabarots could hear nothing of any action at Government House, nor from the distant landing beaches; nevertheless, he ordered the assault to begin. Lieutenant-Commander Sanchez-Sabarots continues his account:

- It was still completely dark. We were going to use tear-gas to force the British out of the buildings and capture them. Our orders were not to cause casualties if possible. That was the most difficult mission of my career. All our training as commandos was to fight aggressively and inflict maximum casualties on the enemy. We surrounded the barracks with machine-gun teams, leaving only one escape route along the peninsula north of Stanley Harbour. Anyone who did get away would not able to reach the town and reinforce the British there. Then we threw the gas grenades into each building. There was no reaction; the barracks were empty.

The noise of the grenades alerted Major Norman to the presence of Argentines on the island, and he thus drove back to Government House. Realising that the attack was coming from Moody Brook, he ordered all troop sections to converge on the house to enable the defence to be centralised.

Although there were no Royal Marine witnesses to the assault, descriptions of the state of Moody Brook barracks afterward contradict the Argentine version of events. After the action, some of the Royal Marines were allowed to return to barracks to collect personal items. Major Norman describes walls of the barracks as riddled with machine gun fire and bearing the marks of white phosphorus grenades - "a classic housekeeping operation".
