= John Pettinger =

Former British Parachute Regiment soldier

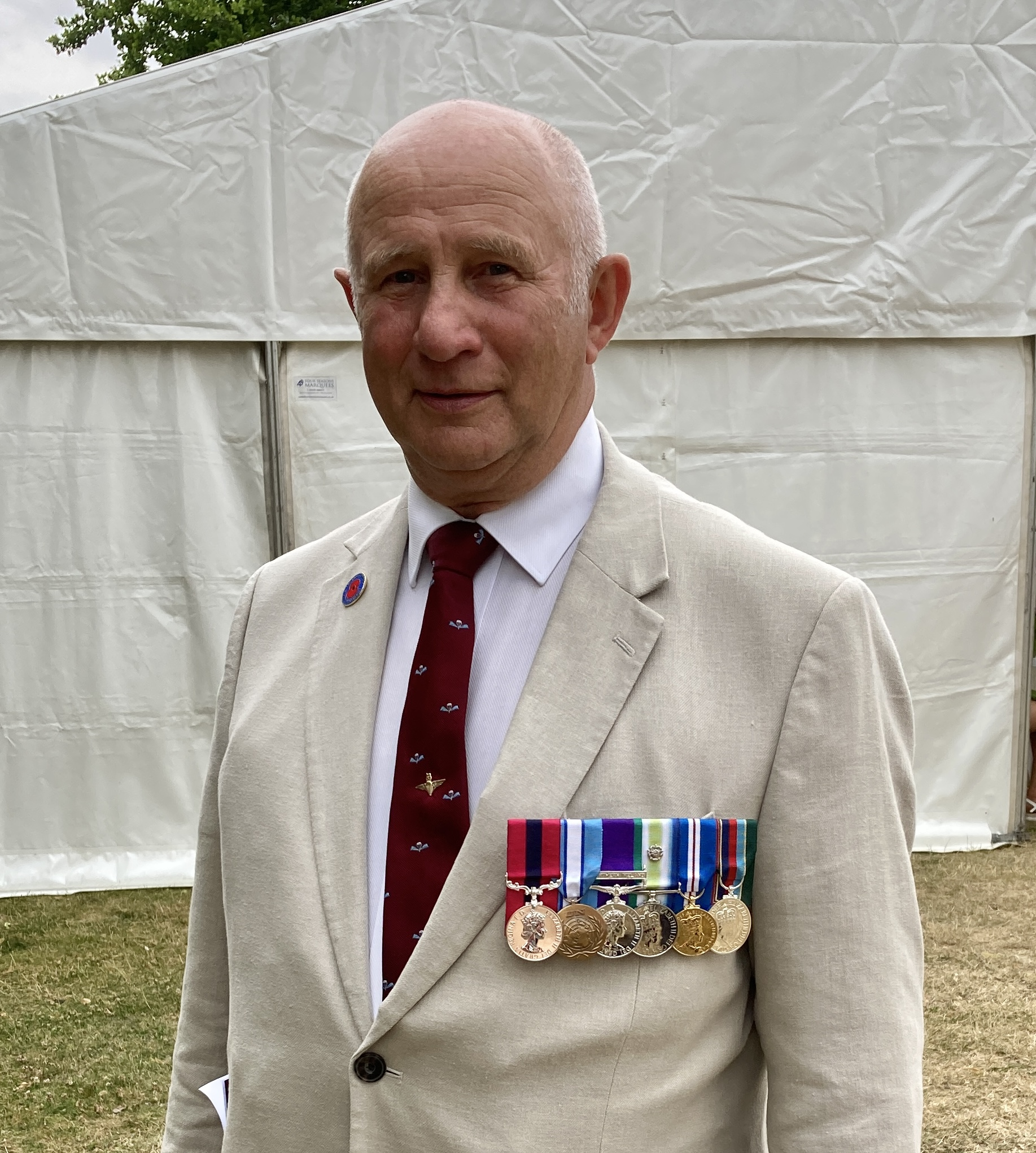
John Stuart Pettinger DCM in 2022

Captain John Stuart Pettinger DCM (born 1953) is a former officer of the Parachute Regiment in the British Army and a veteran of the Falklands War during which he was awarded the Distinguished Conduct Medal (DCM) for bravery. This was a field award for other ranks of the British Army and was the oldest British award for gallantry, at that time ranking second only to the Victoria Cross. His DCM was one of only eight awarded during the conflict, five of which were awarded to the Parachute Regiment. Pettinger was invested with his Distinguished Conduct Medal by Queen Elizabeth II at Buckingham Palace in 1982.

== Early career ==
Pettinger was born in Clitheroe in Lancashire in 1953, the son of Nora née Hodkinson (1924-2002) and Jack Pettinger (1921-1989). He joined the British Army in September 1968 at 15 years old as a junior soldier of the Parachute Regiment. He served for two years with the Infantry Junior Leaders Battalion at Oswestry in Shropshire after which he successfully completed 'P Company', the stringent 'Pre-Parachute Selection' courses for Parachute Regiment recruits. Pettinger was posted to the 3rd Battalion, the Parachute Regiment in early 1971.

In 1972 Pettinger was posted to D (Patrol) Company, 3rd Battalion, the Parachute Regiment with whom he made tours of Northern Ireland and Malaya before being promoted to Corporal instructing recruits at Depot Para at Browning Barracks in Aldershot in Hampshire during 1976–78. In 1975 in Hyndburn in Lancashire he married Yvonne J. Garwood. The marriage was later dissolved. In 1981 he returned to D (Patrol) Company as a Sergeant.

== South Atlantic ==
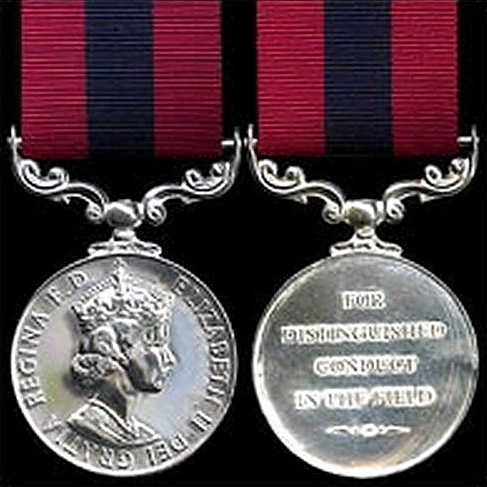
The Distinguished Conduct Medal (EIIR)

On 9 April 1982 Pettinger, with the rest of the 2nd Battalion and 3rd Battalion of the Parachute Regiment sailed from Southampton on SS Canberra, a cruise liner which had been requisitioned as a troopship.

Pettinger served as Patrol Commander of D (Patrol) Company during 11 days of operations in and around the Mount Longdon area on East Falkland. Pettinger's D Company, under cover of darkness, acted as the "eyes and ears" of 3 Para, carrying out six close target reconnaissances of enemy defensive positions in order to identify Argentine machine gun and mortar positions, and entered enemy trenches undetected. Pettinger after guided the men of B Company, 3 Para in the 12-hour Battle of Mount Longdon and killed three Argentinian soldiers.

For his gallant conduct prior to and during the Battle of Mount Longdon, Pettinger is mentioned in various books about the South Atlantic campaign, including: Green-Eyed Boys, 3 Para and the Battle for Mount Longdon by Christian Jennings and Adrian Weale; Excursion To Hell, Mount Longdon, A Universal Story of Battle by Lance Corporal V. Bramley; 3 Days in June: 3 Para's Battle for Mount Longdon, by Private James O’Conell, and 3 Para - Mount Longdon: The Bloodiest Battle by Jon Cooksy, in which Pettinger is quoted and mentioned extensively.

== Citation in The London Gazette ==
24159222 Sergeant John Stuart PETTINGER, The Parachute Regiment

Sergeant Pettinger is a Patrol Commander D (Patrol) Company 3rd Battalion The Parachute Regiment. On the nights of the 2nd/3rd June Sergeant Pettinger was Commander of one of a number of patrols tasked to gain information about enemy forces holding Mount Longdon on East Falkland Island. Sergeant Pettinger's mission was to recce routes onto Mount Longdon with the aim of placing a rifle company in the best possible position for a night assault later. This meant closing with the enemy who at times were only a few metres away in order to gain his information. This he did with great success on four occasions over the two nights, displaying a high standard of skill and coolness, knowing that capture would lead to the compromise of the battalion plans. The information gained led to him being able to produce accurate descriptions of routes onto the objective, detailed information on enemy strengths and locations, and on the night of 8 June to lead a platoon along the assault route in a rehearsal for the planned attack. Once again he closed with the enemy, gained further information, and cleared more routes, again with great coolness. On the night of 11th/12th June, Sergeant Pettinger acted as guide for B Company for their part in the battalion night attack onto Mount Longdon and was able to place them in such a good starting position that the attack came as a complete surprise to the enemy. Once the battle had commenced he was a constant source of information and advice to the Company Commander, while acting with dash and determination during the many assaults against strong points that night, killing at least three enemy. During the preparation for the attack on Mount Longdon Sergeant Pettinger completed six close target reconnaissances against the objective. He displayed the highest standards of professional skill, alertness, accuracy of reporting, coolness in the face of the enemy as well as courage during the actual assault.

== After the Falklands War ==
On returning from the Falklands Pettinger was invested with his Distinguished Conduct Medal by Queen Elizabeth II at Buckingham Palace along with Brian Faulkner. He was promoted to Colour Sergeant, and in 1983 he was posted to the Infantry Training Battle School at Brecon in Wales as an instructor on the Senior NCO division. Later in 1983 he was back with D (Patrol) Company, 3rd Battalion, Parachute Regiment as a Platoon Commander, later becoming the Company Quartermaster Sergeant (CQMS) for Support Company (Sp Coy). He was promoted to Warrant Officer II (WOII) and Company Sergeant Major of B Company in 3 Para and later served as the Senior Permanent Staff Instructor with 10th Battalion, Parachute Regiment (TA) in North London during 1986 to 1989.

In 1989 Pettinger joined 2 Para for another tour of Northern Ireland. In 1990 he was appointed the Regimental Quartermaster Sergeant (RQMS) for the Logistic Battalion and was informed that he was to promoted to Warrant Officer I (WO1) as the Regimental Sergeant Major (RSM) of 2 Para. Instead, from 1991 to 1993 Pettinger was an RSM in the Netherlands at the Support Unit for UK troops at Allied Forces Central Europe (AFCENT). In 1990 in London he married Bernadette M. O'Hanlon.

Pettinger finished his regular army service in August 1993 and immediately joined the Non Regular Permanent Staff with 10th Battalion, Parachute Regiment (10 Para TA) as a Company Quartermaster Sergeant (CQMS). In 1999 10 Para was disbanded, following which Pettinger was transferred to another Territorial Army Unit of the local Royal Logistics Corps. In January 2002 he was commissioned as a captain, becoming the Permanent Staff Administration Officer (PSAO) with 144 Parachute Medical Squadron in Hornsey where he served for three years before retiring from the Army after having served for 36 years.

== Medal auction ==
On 17 September 2020 Pettinger's DCM medal group sold for a hammer price of £130,000 at an auction held by Dix Noonan Webb. Sales fees took the price to £161,200. The group was bought by an anonymous British collector.

After the sale Pettinger stated:

I'm pleased to know that my medals and the story of how I won them are now safely in the hands of a collector.

The money that they have raised will be put to good use in my retirement.

== Pettinger's medals ==
- Distinguished Conduct Medal, E.II.R., 2nd issue (24159222 Sgt J S Pettinger Para)
- United Nations Medal on United Nations Peacekeeping Force in Cyprus (UNFICYP) ribbon
- General Service Medal, with Northern Ireland clasp (24159222 Pte. J. S. Pettinger Para)
- South Atlantic Medal 1982, with rosette (24159222 Sgt J S Pettinger Para)
- Golden Jubilee Medal 2002, unnamed as issued
- Volunteer Reserves Service Medal, E.II.R. (Capt J S Pettinger RAMC)
