= Ian Bailey (British Army soldier) =

British Army soldier

- Born: 1959 (age 66–67)
- Military career
- Allegiance: United Kingdom
- Branch: British Army
- Service years: c. 1977–2002
- Rank: Captain
- Service number: 24438472
- Unit: 3rd Battalion, Parachute Regiment
- Conflicts: The Troubles; Falklands War: Battle of Mount Longdon
- Awards: Military Medal

Ian Philip Bailey, MM (born 1959) is a former British Army officer. As a corporal in 4 Platoon, B Company, 3rd Battalion, The Parachute Regiment, he won the Military Medal for bravery during the Falklands War of 1982. He later sold the medal for a record price.

== Battle of Mount Longdon ==
During the Battle of Mount Longdon on 12 June 1982, 4 Platoon's Commanding Officer, Lieutenant Bickerdyke, along with Sergeant Ian McKay, a signaller and several other paratroopers went forward to reconnoitre the enemy positions. During this action Bickerdyke and the signaller were wounded by a heavy machine-gun position, so McKay took over command of the platoon. He decided to turn his reconnaissance into an attack on the machine gun's position, which was seriously threatening any advance. He took Bailey, then aged 22, and three other men with him and they charged the position. Bailey and two other men were wounded, the third man being killed as they charged forward into the enemy fire.

McKay carried on the attack alone, attacking and destroying the heavy machine-gun with grenades. He was killed at the moment of victory, his body falling onto the ruined enemy bunker. He was awarded a posthumous Victoria Cross for his bravery during the attack, which allowed the advance to continue. Corporal Bailey was awarded the Military Medal.

Bailey later said of the attack on Mount Longdon:

Ian and I had a talk and decided the aim was to get across to the next cover, which was 35 metres away. There were some Argentinian positions there but we didn't know the exact location. He shouted out to the other corporals to give covering fire, three machine-guns altogether, then we – Sergeant McKay, myself and three private soldiers to the left of us – set off.

As we were moving across the open ground, two of the privates were killed by rifle or machine-gun fire almost at once; the other private got across and into cover. We grenaded the first position and went past it without stopping, just firing into it, and that’s when I got shot from one of the other positions which was about ten feet away. I think it was a rifle. I got hit in the hip and went down. Sergeant McKay was still going on to the next position but there was no one else with him.

The last I saw of him, he was just going on, running towards the remaining positions in that group. I was lying on my back and I listened to men calling each other. They were trying to find out what was happening but, when they called out to Sergeant McKay, there was no reply. I got shot again soon after that, by bullets in the neck and hand.

Bailey was shot three times during the assault and the final bullet and the last of the shrapnel were not removed from his hip until 2009, he having been unaware that it was still there. He was also shot in the neck and the bullet severed the cord holding his identity tags; they were found in 1983 during a de-mining operation.

== After the war ==
When McKay was buried at Aldershot Military Cemetery in 1982 Bailey was one of those who carried his coffin. Bailey later reached the rank of warrant officer class I and was commissioned as a captain in the Parachute Regiment on 6 April 2000. He retired from the army on 3 December 2002. He then worked in the security industry. In November 2009 it was reported in the British media that he intended to sell his Military Medal group because he was unable to work following further surgery in 2009 to remove shrapnel from his hip left from his 1982 injuries. The medals sold at auction on 2 December 2009 to an anonymous British collector for a hammer price of £70,000, a record for a Military Medal.

Bailey lives in Ash Vale in Surrey with his wife and two children.

== Bailey's medals ==
- Military Medal, E.II.R., 2nd issue (24438472 Cpl I P Bailey Para)
- General Service Medal, with Northern Ireland clasp (24438472 L Cpl I P Bailey Para)
- South Atlantic Medal 1982, with rosette (24438472 Cpl I P Bailey Para)
- United Nations Medal, Cyprus
- NATO Medal, with Kosovo clasp
- Queen Elizabeth II Golden Jubilee Medal
- Regular Army Long Service and Good Conduct Medal E.II.R. (24438472 S Sgt I P Bailey Para).

His Military Medal was one of only 12 awarded to the Parachute Regiment and one of the total 34 awarded for the campaign.
