= Brian Faulkner (British Army soldier) =

Former soldier of the Parachute Regiment in the British Army

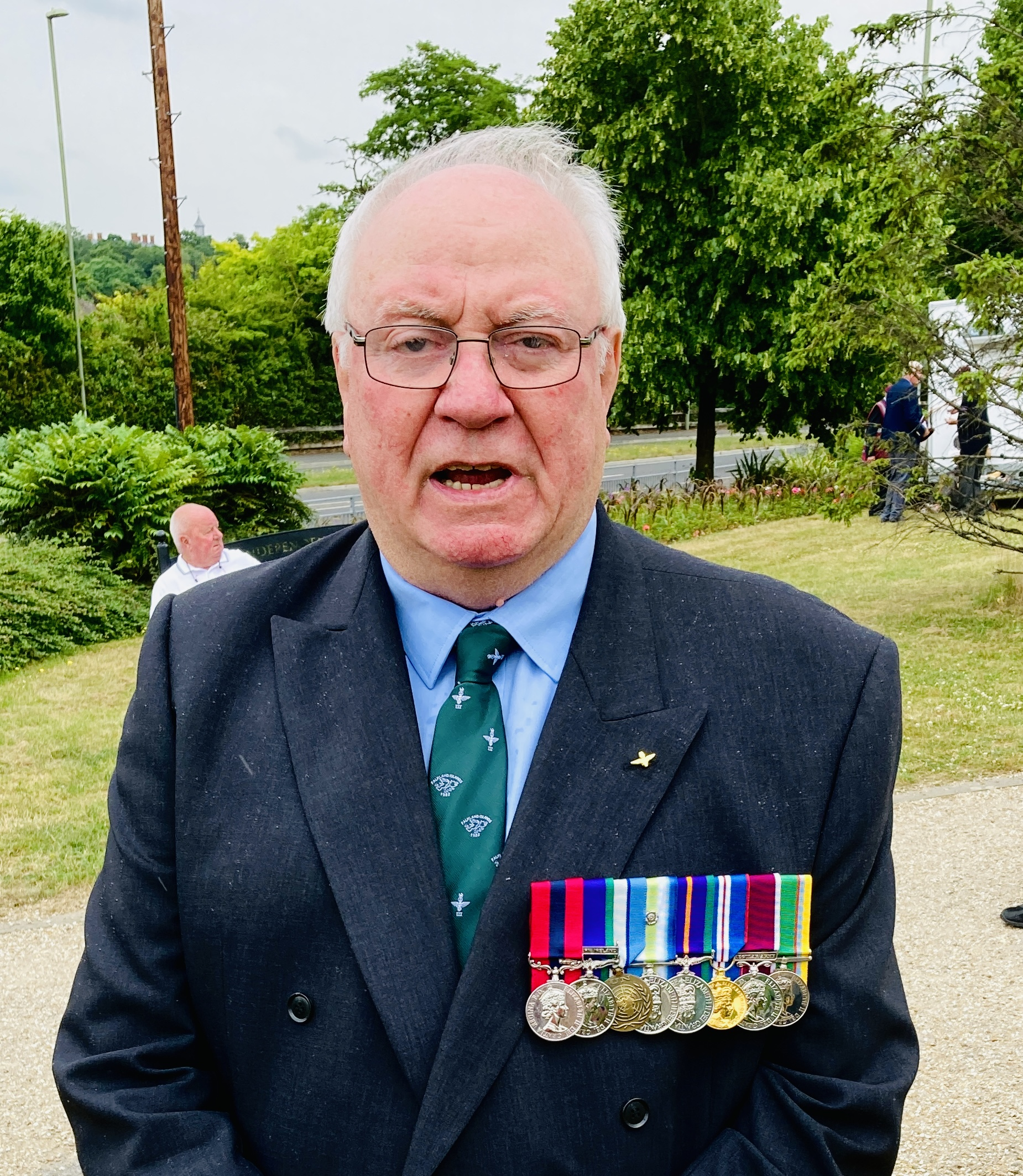
Brian Faulkner DCM in 2022

Brian Faulkner DCM (born 11 August 1947) is a former soldier of the Parachute Regiment in the British Army and a veteran of the Falklands War during which he was awarded the Distinguished Conduct Medal (DCM) for bravery. This was a field award for other ranks of the British Army and was the oldest British award for gallantry, at that time ranking second only to the Victoria Cross. His DCM was one of only eight awarded during the conflict, five of which were awarded to the Parachute Regiment. Faulkner is a member of The Gallantry Medallists' League of the United Kingdom. He received his medal from Queen Elizabeth II during an investiture ceremony at Buckingham Palace in 1982.

== Early career ==
Faulkner was a coal miner in his native Yorkshire before enlisting into the York and Lancaster Regiment in December 1962 before transferring to the Parachute Regiment in 1965, being posted to the 3rd Battalion, Parachute Regiment (3 PARA). He served in Northern Ireland and Cyprus before taking part in the Falklands War (1982).

Corporal Faulkner went to the Depot, The Parachute Regiment and Airborne Forces at Aldershot in Hampshire from 1975 to 1977 before returning to 3 PARA.

In 1982 C/Sgt Faulkner was serving with 3 Para during the Falklands War when he was awarded the Distinguished Conduct Medal (DCM) for bravery during the Battle of Mount Longdon. At that time the DCM was the British Army's second highest award for bravery by other ranks, second only to the Victoria Cross. Of this action:

On observing a group of Argentinian Marines advancing towards his Regimental Aid Post on the western slope of the mountain and realising that some 20 wounded Paratroopers were about to be captured (or worse) he deployed anyone fit enough to defend the position. He relates that he: "...picked three or four blokes and got up on a high feature. As I did so, a group of twenty or thirty Argentines came towards us. We just opened fire on them. We don't know how many we killed, but they got what they deserved because none of them were left standing when we had finished with them.

== Citation from the London Gazette ==
23951692 Staff Sergeant Brian FAULKNER, The Parachute Regiment

Colour Sergeant Faulkner, as the Regimental Aid Post Colour Sergeant during the attack by 3rd Battalion The Parachute Regiment on Mount Longdon on the night 11th/12th June, performed throughout with the utmost dedication and bravery in extreme conditions of weather and under constant, accurate artillery and mortar bombardment. He never faltered, setting a magnificent personal example of courage and competence, that was well beyond anything that could reasonably be expected. One burst of shellfire left him concussed, but he swiftly returned to his duties. One minute he could be seen consoling young soldiers, severely distressed by the experience of losing their comrades, and by the sight of terrible wounds, and then yet again he would be busy with his prime duty of tending for the casualties themselves. His personal coolness and bravery did much to calm those around him. Twice under alarm of counter attack, he forcefully rallied the Regimental Aid Post, Stretcher Bearers and those passing through the area, to form a defensive perimeter, and these actions typified his constant alertness to the tactical situation which overlaid his specialist responsibilities. Once he himself led a counter attack up the ridge, to an area where he knew soldiers had been killed.

Colour Sergeant Faulkner's gallantry and example on this night, and in the subsequent two days of bombardment on Mount Longdon, were in the highest tradition of the Army, and were typical of his consistently brave and outstanding performance throughout the operation.

== Later career ==
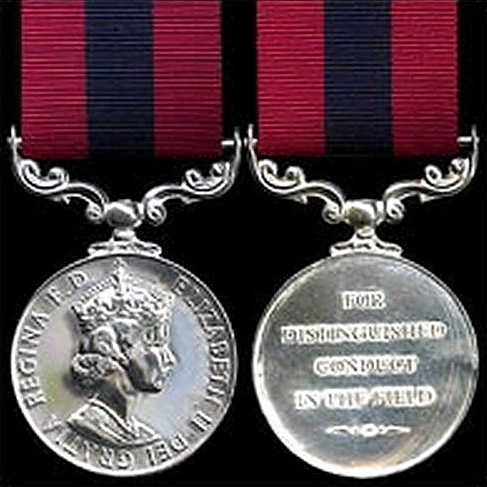
The Distinguished Conduct Medal (EIIR)

On his return from the Falklands War Faulkner received his Distinguished Conduct Medal from Queen Elizabeth II at Buckingham Palace, along with Sgt. John Pettinger.

Recalling the investiture later, Faulkner said:

Towards the end of the year, Sergeant John Pettinger, who also won the DCM, and I went to Buckingham Palace to receive our awards from the Queen... The Queen pinned the award on me and spoke quite a bit to us but to this day, I cannot remember what she said. I was so overawed by the whole occasion, I can't remember a thing. But I can tell you it was one of the greatest days of my life, which I shall remember for ever … what finer accolade can a soldier have than to be decorated for gallantry and have the Sovereign pin it on your chest?

He was back at Depot Para in Aldershot until 1985. Warrant Officer II Faulkner then served with the 4th Battalion, Parachute Regiment (4 PARA) until October 1986. He then served for a year at Parachute Regiment Headquarters until his retirement in 1987.

From 1991 to 2007 Faulkner joined the Territorial Army where he trained recruits. From 2007 to 2012 he worked in administration for the Royal Engineers.

During his military service Faulkner served in Northern Ireland, Malta, Libya, Canada, Australia, Cyprus, the Falkland Islands and Germany.

A Freemason, Faulkner is a member of Pegasus Forces Lodge No 9393 which meets at the Masonic Centre in Aldershot in Hampshire.

== Medal auction ==
Faulkner's DCM medal group was sold at auction and donated to the collection of the National Army Museum, the national museum for the British Army, in Chelsea in London. Of having to reluctantly sell his cherished gallantry medals, Faulkner later commented:

When I left the Army, I invested my end-of-term gratuity in stocks and shares but when the market crashed I lost the lot. We had nothing left and I decided the DCM had to go. A medal collector gave me €7,000 for it and we got back on our feet. I never told my wife, Kath. I simply bought a replica. Eventually, someone else got the medal and decided to auction it - the story was about to break in the newspapers, so I had to come clean. Kath was very understanding, if bemused, about it. As far as I am concerned it had to be done. To this day, I bitterly regret having to get rid of it because I treasured it, but needs must. However, I am delighted to say someone bought it and donated it to the National Army Museum in London. If I won the Lottery, I would buy it back tomorrow and then give it back to the National Army Museum but at least I would know it was wholly mine again.

== Faulkner's medals ==
- Distinguished Conduct Medal, E.II.R., 2nd issue (23951692 C/Sgt Brian Faulkner Para)
- General Service Medal, with Northern Ireland clasp (23951692 Pte Brian Faulkner Para)
- United Nations Medal on United Nations Peacekeeping Force in Cyprus (UNFICYP) ribbon
- South Atlantic Medal 1982, with rosette (23951692 C/Sgt Brian Faulkner Para)
- Accumulated Campaign Service Medal
- Queen Elizabeth II Golden Jubilee Medal, unnamed as issued
- Medal for Long Service and Good Conduct (Military)
- Cadet Forces Medal
