= Model 1968 recoilless gun =

Argentine recoilless rifle

Modelo 1968
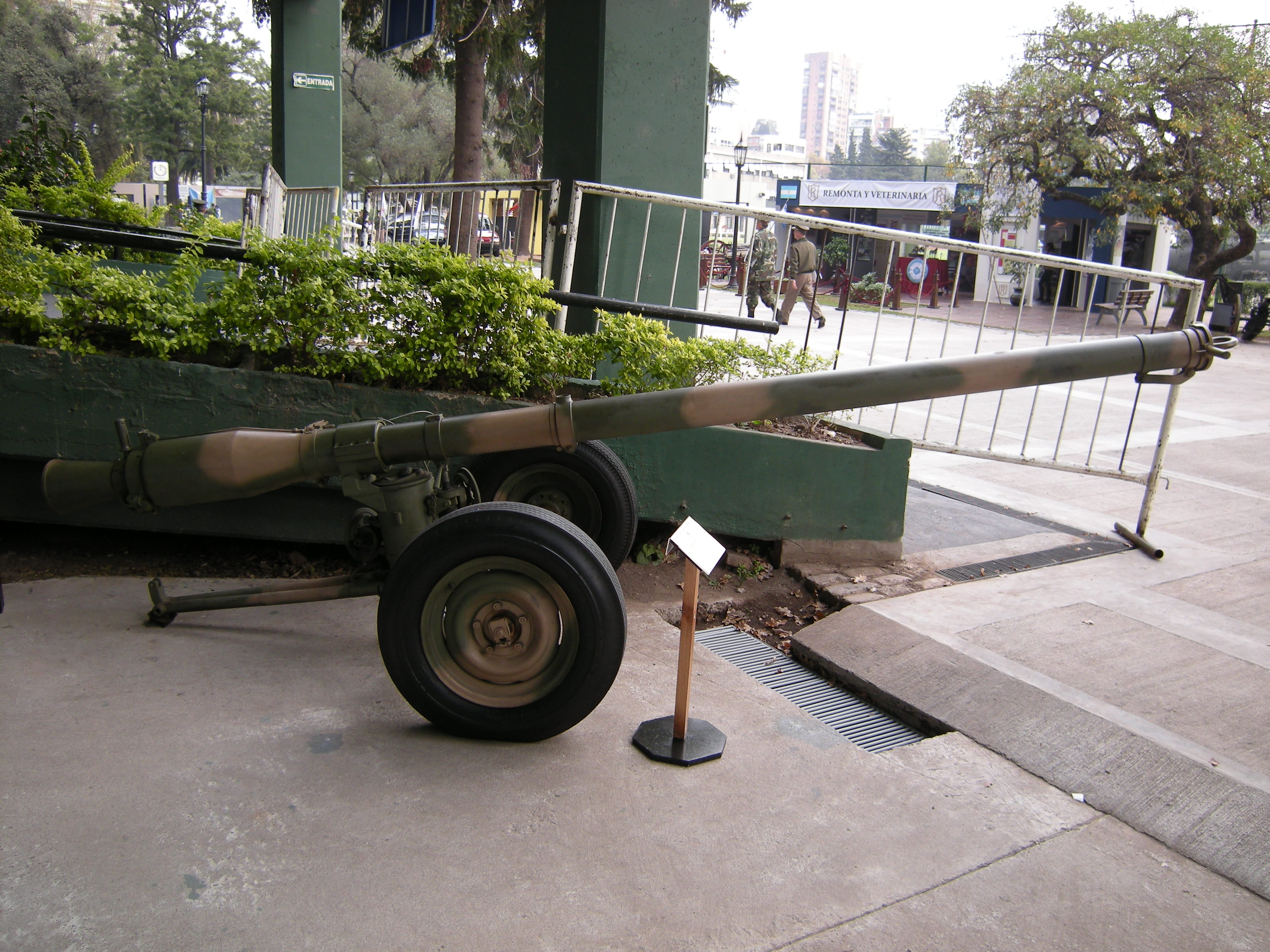
- Type: Recoilless rifle
- Place of origin: Argentina

Service history
- Used by: Argentina
- Wars: Falklands War

Production history
- Designed: 1960s
- Manufacturer: Rio Tercero Military Factory
- Produced: 1968

Specifications
- Mass: 397 kg (875 lb)
- Length: 4.20 m (13.8 ft)
- Barrel length: 3.00 m (9.84 ft)
- Height: 1.07 m (3.5 ft) (Model 1974)
- Crew: 4
- Shell: HEAT, HE
- Elevation: -7 to +40°
- Traverse: 360°
- Rate of fire: 3-5 rpm
- Muzzle velocity: 400 m/s
- Maximum firing range: 9,200 m (5.7 mi)
- Sights: 4x optical stadiametric rangefinder

The Model 1968 recoilless rifle is a 105mm anti-tank gun developed and employed by Argentina. The weapon has been in active service since 1968 and 150 were still operational with Argentine forces as of 2000.

== Description ==
The Model 1968 is mounted on a towing carriage with wheels for transport and can be fired either with its wheels on or dismounted onto a tripod. Aiming is customarily done using the optical sight, but the weapon also includes a FAP (Fusil Automatico Pesado) or (Heavy Automatic Rifle) spotting rifle. Ammunition for the Model 1968 includes both an 11.1-kilogram (24.47 lb) high-explosive anti-tank (HEAT) shell with 400 m/s muzzle velocity and a 15.6 kg (34.39 lb) HE shell being able to penetrate approximately 200mm (7.87 inches) of armor.

The maximum range of the Model 1968 is 9,200 meters with an effective range of between 1,200 and 1,800 meters using the optical sight with stadiametric rangefinder. Like many recoilless rifles, there is a significant Backblast area from the Model 1968 with a 40-meter danger zone to the rear of the weapon.

== Combat history ==
The Model 1968 was deployed during the Falklands (Malvinas) campaign to retake Port Stanley and the weapon was used during Mount Longdon. The Argentine Army units which being the 7th Infantry Regiment and Argentine Marine platoons in the outer hills defending those positions used the Model 1968 as a direct-fire and indirect-fire anti-tank piece against advancing British formations. One contemporary account states these rifles were used to bombard advancing 3 PARA units and even hit a British MILAN anti-tank position during the Battle of Mount Longdon. The Argentine military attempted to use it as self-propelled artillery or as a tank destroyer. At least two prototypes (one being either an IHC M5 or M9 half-track and the other a Bren carrier) were fitted with a six-cannon mount each, similar to that of the US-made M50 Ontos.

== Operators ==
=== Current ===
- Argentina
- Guatemala: 64 M-1974 guns acquired in 1982 or 1983.

=== Former ===
- Bolivia: 72 M-1974 guns acquired in 1981.
- Peru: 156 Model 1968 guns acquired in 1971.
- Uruguay: 1 Model 1968 donated by Argentina to the National Navy of Uruguay in 1983.
