= Terry Peck =

Falkland Islands soldier and police officer (1938–2006)

Terry Peck MBE CPM
- Born: Terence John Peck; 2 August 1938; Stanley, Falkland Islands
- Died: 30 December 2006 (aged 68); Stanley, Falkland Islands
- Education: Bramshill Police College, Hampshire
- Occupations: Falkland Islands Legislator, Chief of Police (Ret'd), Youth Leader
- Known for: Scout, 3rd Battalion, The Parachute Regiment, Falklands War, Chairman SAMA 82 Falkland Islands Branch
- Spouse: Eleanor Peck
- Children: 2 sons (inc. James Peck a local artist), 2 daughters, 2 step-daughters
- Military career
- Allegiance: United Kingdom
- Branch: Falkland Islands Defence Force
- Conflicts: Falklands War: Battle of Stanley; Battle of Mount Longdon
- Awards: CPM (1975) MBE (1982)

Terence John Peck MBE CPM (2 August 1938 – 30 December 2006) was a member of the Falkland Islands Defence Force who during the 1982 Falklands War became a war hero by spying on the Argentine invaders, subsequently escaping to British lines, acting as a scout for 3rd Battalion, Parachute Regiment, and taking part in the fighting for Mount Longdon. A fiercely patriotic Islander, he vehemently opposed Argentina's claim to the Islands. He later met and befriended an Argentine conscript who served during the war.

== Early life ==
Born in Stanley, he was descended from Irish and English (Norfolk) emigrants to the Falkland Islands. Educated in Stanley, in his youth he boxed and became a member of the Boys' Brigade. On leaving school he found work in the construction of a meat packing plant at Ajax Bay in Falkland Sound. After joining the Police Force and the Falkland Islands Defence Force he became involved with the Argentine Sovereignty Claim in 1966.

=== 1966 Aerolineas Argentinas DC-4 hijacking ===
On 26 September 1966, an Aerolíneas Argentinas DC-4 flew low over Stanley before attempting to land at the racecourse. On its approach it clipped telegraph poles, and on touching down the undercarriage sank into the soft ground bringing the aircraft to an immediate and jarring stop. Earlier that day, the aircraft had been hijacked whilst on an internal flight by Right-Wing Argentine nationalists, known as the Condor Group, who forced the crew to fly to the Falklands, apparently unaware there was then no airport.

The hijackers chose the specific flight in question because Argentinian Rear Admiral José María Guzmán, who at the time was the then Governor of Tierra del Fuego (the Argentinian province to which the Falklands theoretically belonged) was aboard. Islanders, including Peck, assumed the aircraft was in trouble and rushed to help only to be taken hostage by the terrorists. As a part of the negotiations, the 26 passengers of the plane were exchanged with seven islanders, including Peck and Captain Ian Martin, commanding a four-man Royal Marines detachment.

== Police ==
He continued in his career with the Police Force becoming the Chief of Police and attending the Bramshill Police College, Hampshire. While serving in the police force, he displayed his characteristic courage and tenacity, on one occasion driving for 10 hours across the Camp to rescue a family whose house burnt down one Christmas. On another he ignored orders, diving on the wreck of an aircraft in Mare Harbour to assist in the rescue of the bodies of the occupants. Although he was awarded the Colonial Police Medal in 1975, he became dissatisfied with the police service and retired early. One of the secret duties of the Chief of Police was to collate intelligence on local political agitators, including legislative councillors, and the few Argentines living in Stanley; this was a duty he found increasingly distasteful. He was elected a member of the Legislative Council shortly afterward, where he ardently opposed any transfer of sovereignty to Argentina. In 1980, when Nicholas Ridley visited the islands to attempt to persuade the islanders to accept the leaseback proposal that the Falklands be given to Argentina, then leased back for 100 years, he fitted a loud hailer to his Land Rover with which the protestors harangued Ridley on his journey to the airport.

== Falklands War ==
Peck was sworn back in as special constable the day before Argentina invaded, and at one time was considered by the Argentine occupiers as a candidate for Chief of Police; they could not have considered a more unsuitable candidate. He immediately began to do his utmost to undermine the occupying forces. His behaviour after the invasion caused consternation amongst the locals as he appeared to be wandering around Stanley clutching a length of drainpipe. In reality this disguised a telephoto lens, with which he photographed Argentine preparations for the defence of the town. The photographs he had taken were smuggled out of the Falklands by British contract workers taking the opportunity to leave the islands, providing valuable intelligence for British Forces.

The Argentine military police, led by Major Patricio Dowling, arrived on the islands with detailed files on many islanders, particularly those known for their anti-Argentine views. Dowling, an Argentine of Irish origin who hated all things British, frequently overstepped his authority, ignoring instructions to treat the islanders with respect, and quickly became known for his tendency to resort to violence. Constable Anton Livermore had been asked to stay on with the police force to defuse potentially serious clashes between locals and the Argentines. Increasingly unhappy in the role he found himself in, when he heard Dowling discussing the imminent arrest of Terry Peck he took the opportunity to warn his former boss.

Having prepared a possible escape plan for some time, Peck armed himself with a semi-automatic pistol, borrowed a motorbike from the garage of an expatriate and fled Stanley. His first stop was Long Island Farm, home of Neil and Glenda Watson, where a party was in full swing celebrating the Queen's birthday. This was nearly his undoing, as the party did not hear the approach of a Puma helicopter until it was too late and the house was already surrounded by Argentine soldiers. Fortunately the search of the house was half-hearted, and he escaped detection by the simple expedient of locking himself in the toilet. He left for Green Patch to find the locals expecting him; there he acquired cold weather gear and rations left there by a party of Royal Navy sailors from HMS Endurance. He then spent ten miserable days camping in a remote part of the islands known as Geordie's Valley, where he had fished before the occupation. Eventually the cold sapped his morale and he risked a fire for the chance of a hot meal; unfortunately, just as it was ready he accidentally knocked it over. It was the lowest point of his escape and, demoralised, he sought help from Trudi Morrison at Brookfield Farm. A warm meal and a bath improved his mood, and with the help of other islanders he recovered weapons hidden by Royal Marines who escaped during the invasion.

On 21 May, he finally heard the news he had been waiting for. Isabel Short, a resident of Port San Carlos issued the cryptic message "We've just received a lot of friends" over the short wave radio. When the BBC confirmed the landing, Peck immediately set out to link up with British forces. Coming over the ridge at Port San Carlos, he saw long lines of British marching inland from the beachhead. He was grilled for three days by intelligence officers anxious to gather as much information as they could about the enemy. On the 2nd day he was approached by Major Roger Patton of the 3rd Battalion, The Parachute Regiment, with a request to act as a guide for his troops. Peck volunteered without hesitation and was attached to 3 Para's D patrol company. His first major contribution to the campaign was to organise local farmers and their vehicles to help overcome the severe lack of military transport. For 10 days, he joined patrols sent out at night to identify enemy numbers and tactical positions.

Mount Longdon was attacked on 11 June 1982, it was intended to be a silent attack meaning that there was no artillery barrage to alert the defenders but the element of surprise was lost when one of the paras stepped on a mine. The Battle of Mount Longdon proved to be one of the bloodiest battles of the entire campaign but Terry advanced all the way with British forces. When a soldier was shot near him, he volunteered to carry the man back down the mountain. His account describes the action:

We carried him down this slope but sometimes we had to lie across him, because of the fire that was coming. We were catching it left, right and centre. It was lit up like Blackpool. Really horrendous. We got this guy down into a crater caused by a shell. We had eight wounded in that hole with two medics, that's how big the hole was.

Peck remained with the battalion on Mount Longdon, existing on toffees and food scavenged from Argentine trenches, enduring an artillery barrage from long range 155 mm guns based in Stanley. He did not return home until 3 Para marched into Stanley. For his actions in supporting British forces in the advance on Stanley he was awarded an MBE in 1982. However, he considered the honorary membership conferred upon him by the 3rd Battalion, The Parachute Regiment the greater honour and wore his maroon beret and winged cap badge with great pride. Every year after the war on 11 June, he visited the memorial on the summit of Mount Longdon to pay his respects to fallen comrades.

After the war for a time he became disillusioned with the prospects for the islands' future and left to begin a new life in Scotland in 1984. He returned to the islands and stood for election to the Falkland Islands Government but failed to win back his seat. After standing again he succeeded, standing from 1989 to 1993. He continued to express his views in a forthright manner lambasting the British Government for the lack of aid and castigating Margaret Thatcher for allowing Argentines to visit the graves of their war dead. In his role as councillor he promoted a number of local causes, in particular ensuring a fair deal for local contractors in the employment on post-war aid projects. He became a manager of the local YMCA.

== Later years ==
Miguel Savage and Terry Peck after exchanging berets. Miguel presented Terry with his Gaucho beret and Terry in return gave him one of his berets awarded due to his honorary membership of the Parachute Regiment

Following his experiences on Mount Longdon he was to suffer from Post-Traumatic Stress Disorder. He devoted a great deal of his to time to the South Atlantic Medal Association (SAMA 82), using his personal experiences to help others. As chairman of the local SAMA 82 group he worked tirelessly to organise the visits of British veterans coming to terms with their wartime experiences.

His son James became a well known artist in the islands, his work on the Falklands War reflecting the suffering of individual soldiers particularly the Argentine conscripts. After receiving an offer of an exhibition in Buenos Aires he thought long and hard before approaching his father. Peck gave his support and during his exhibition James met and befriended Miguel Savage, an Argentine Veteran of the Falklands War. After the travel restrictions on Argentine citizens were lifted, Savage travelled to the islands where he met Peck and together they walked over their former battleground together. Savage described their parting thus:

Life has given us the opportunity to meet and be friends and we won't waste it. When Terry came to say goodbye, we embraced as friends.

Savage returned to the islands, and Peck presented him with one of his prized maroon berets. One of the islanders observed, "Getting that from Terry is like being awarded the Victoria Cross."

On 30 December 2006, he died of cancer.
