= Ian McKay =

British soldier (1953–1982)

Ian John McKay
- Born: 7 May 1953; Wortley, West Riding of Yorkshire, England
- Died: 12 June 1982 (aged 29); Mount Longdon, Falkland Islands
- Burial place: Aldershot Military Cemetery
- Military career
- Allegiance: United Kingdom
- Branch: British Army
- Service years: 1970–1982
- Rank: Sergeant
- Unit: 3rd Battalion, The Parachute Regiment
- Conflicts: The Troubles; Falklands War: Battle of Mount Longdon †
- Awards: Victoria Cross

Ian John McKay, VC (7 May 1953 – 12 June 1982) was a British Army soldier and a posthumous recipient of the Victoria Cross, the highest award for gallantry in the face of the enemy that can be awarded to British and Commonwealth forces.

Born in Wortley, near Barnsley, South Yorkshire, McKay was the eldest of the three sons of Kenneth John McKay, a steel worker, and Freda Doreen Hargreaves. He was educated at Rotherham Grammar School.

McKay left school at seventeen and in August 1970 enlisted in the Army, training as a paratrooper. Posted to the 1st Battalion, the Parachute Regiment (1 Para) in early 1971, he served in Northern Ireland, Germany, and the United Kingdom.

On 30 January 1972, McKay was part of a patrol on the streets of Derry involved in the killing of unarmed civilians known as Bloody Sunday. In official reports concerning the massacre he is referred to as Private T. An inquiry concluded that McKay was likely responsible for firing the shot which wounded Patrick Brolly. However, the inquiry determined that he was the only soldier present who had not fired indiscriminately, had a valid reason to fire, and had not intended to shoot Brolly. The inquiry found that if he did fire the shots which wounded Brolly, he unintentionally hit him while aiming at another man who was throwing bottles containing acid at him.

By April 1982 he was platoon sergeant of 4 Platoon, B Company, 3rd Battalion, The Parachute Regiment, and deployed with his unit for service in the Falklands War. He was killed during the Battle of Mount Longdon, for which he was awarded the Victoria Cross.

== Citation ==
During the night of 11th/12th June 1982, 3rd Battalion The Parachute Regiment mounted a silent night attack on an enemy battalion position on Mount Longdon, an important objective in the battle for Port Stanley in the Falkland Islands. Sergeant McKay was platoon sergeant of 4 Platoon, B Company, which, after the initial objective had been secured, was ordered to clear the Northern side of the long East/West ridge feature, held by the enemy in depth, with strong, mutually-supporting positions. By now the enemy were fully alert, and resisting fiercely. As 4 Platoon's advance continued it came under increasingly heavy fire from a number of well-sited enemy machine gun positions on the ridge, and received casualties. Realising that no further advance was possible the Platoon Commander ordered the Platoon to move from its exposed position to seek shelter among the rocks of the ridge itself. Here it met up with part of 5 Platoon.

The enemy fire was still both heavy and accurate, and the position of the platoons was becoming increasingly hazardous. Taking Sergeant McKay, a Corporal and a few others, and covered by supporting machine gun fire, the Platoon Commander moved forward to reconnoitre the enemy positions but was hit by a bullet in the leg, and command devolved upon Sergeant McKay.

It was clear that instant action was needed if the advance was not to falter and increasing casualties to ensue. Sergeant McKay decided to convert this reconnaissance into an attack in order to eliminate the enemy positions. He was in no doubt of the strength and deployment of the enemy as he undertook this attack. He issued orders, and taking three men with him, broke cover and charged the enemy position.

The assault was met by a hail of fire. The Corporal was seriously wounded, a Private killed and another wounded. Despite these losses Sergeant McKay, with complete disregard for his own safety, continued to charge the enemy position alone. On reaching it he despatched the enemy with grenades, thereby relieving the position of beleaguered 4 and 5 Platoons, who were now able to redeploy with relative safety. Sergeant McKay, however, was killed at the moment of victory, his body falling on the bunker.

Without doubt Sergeant McKay's action retrieved a most dangerous situation and was instrumental in ensuring the success of the attack. His was a coolly calculated act, the dangers of which must have been all too apparent to him beforehand. Undeterred he performed with outstanding selflessness, perseverance and courage.

With a complete disregard for his own safety, he displayed courage and leadership of the highest order, and was an inspiration to all those around him.

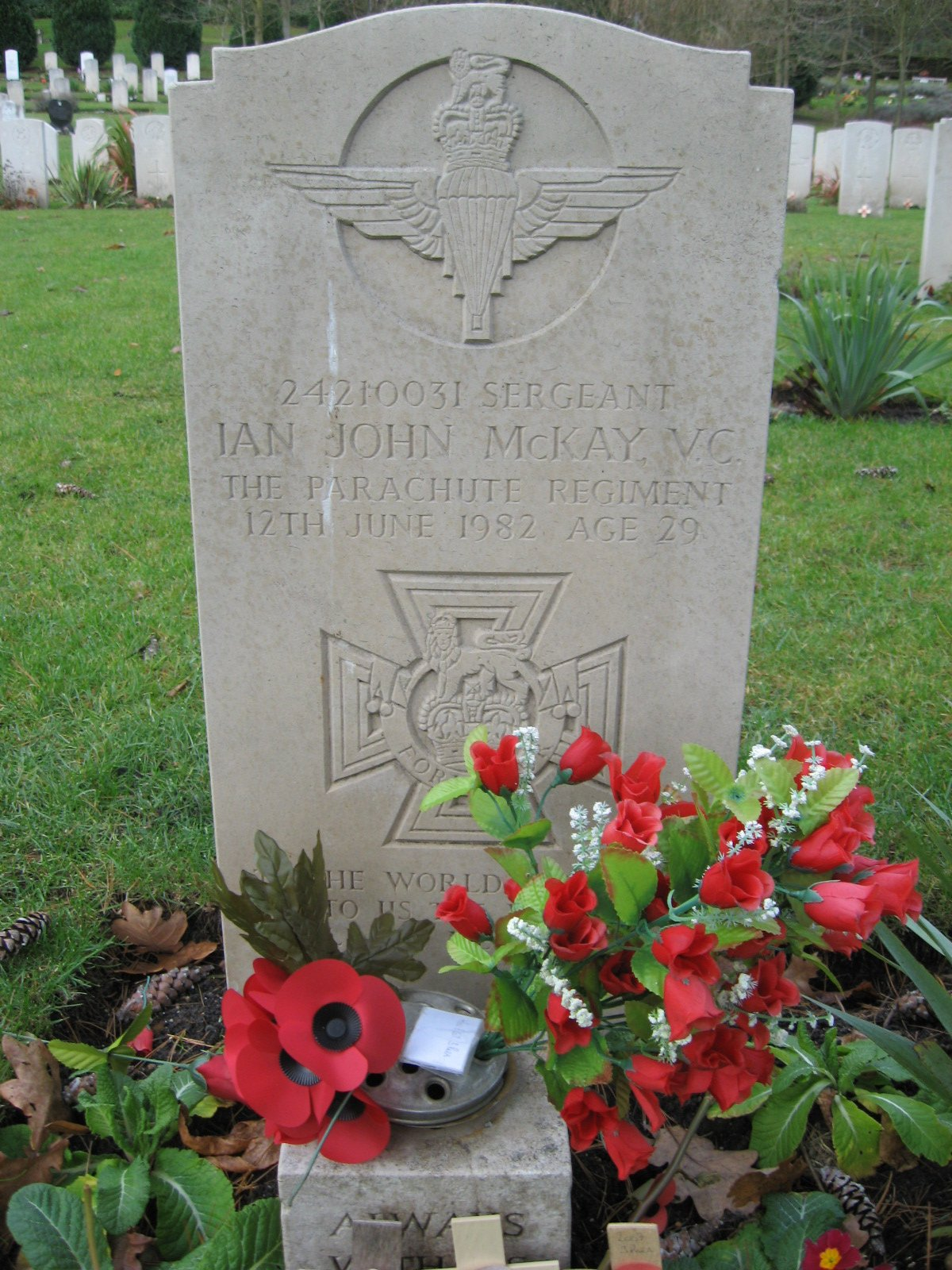
McKay's grave in Aldershot Military Cemetery

After initial burial in the Falklands, McKay was later brought home, and on 26 November 1982 he was re-buried with full military honours at Aldershot Military Cemetery.

== The medal ==
McKay's medals were sold by his wife around the year 1989, and his VC is now held in the Lord Ashcroft Collection.

== Legacy ==
The Territorial Army centre in Sgt McKay's home town of Rotherham is named "McKay VC Barracks", also an accommodation block at the Defence Academy at Shrivenham was named McKay House in his honour.

In mid October 2011, the Sergeants and Warrant Officers bar at MPA, Falkland Islands, was renamed as "Ian McKay VC Bar" in his honour.

The McKay VC Gymnasium is a gym facility and sports hall located across the football fields at Vimy Barracks, Catterick Garrison. A facility that oversees the training of recruits from The Parachute Regiment and other Units.

McKay was profiled in the 2006 television docudrama Victoria Cross Heroes, which included archive footage, dramatisations of his actions and an interview with his mother.

The Bloody Sunday Inquiry found that, of the soldiers who fired upon civilians, Private T (McKay) was the only one to do so with plausible cause if he was responsible for shooting Patrick Brolly and injuring him.
