= Battle of Mount Longdon =

1982 Falklands War conflict

Coordinates: 51°40′12″S 57°58′51″W

- Part of Falklands War
- Mountains around Mount Longdon
Date	11–12 June 1982
Location	Mount Longdon, Falkland Islands
Result	British victory

Belligerents
United Kingdom	Argentina

Commanders and leaders
(United Kingdom) Lt. Col Hew Pike	(Argentina) Maj. Carlos Carrizo-Salvadores

Units involved
Parachute Regiment: 3 PARA; 3 Commando Brigade: 29th Commando Regiment Royal Artillery; (United Kingdom) Royal Navy	10th Mechanized Infantry Brigade: 7th Infantry Regiment

Strength
450; 6 light guns 1 frigate	278

Casualties and losses
23 killed ~60 wounded	31 killed 120 wounded 50 captured

The Battle of Mount Longdon was fought between the British 3rd Battalion, Parachute Regiment and elements of the Argentine 7th Infantry Regiment on 11–12 June 1982, towards the end of the Falklands War. It was one of three engagements in a brigade-size operation that night, along with the Battle of Mount Harriet and the Battle of Two Sisters.

A mixture of hand-to-hand fighting and ranged combat resulted in the British occupying this position above Port Stanley, allowing its capture and the surrender of Argentine forces on the islands.

== Background ==
=== British forces ===
The British force consisted of the Third Battalion, the Parachute Regiment (3 PARA), under Lieutenant Colonel Hew Pike. Artillery support came from six 105mm light guns of 29 Commando Regiment Royal Artillery and the 4.5-in gun of HMS Avenger, Second Battalion, the Parachute Regiment (2 PARA) were in reserve.

British paratroopers carried the semi-automatic L1A1 Self-Loading Rifle (SLR) and the L7A2 General Purpose Machine Gun (GPMG). Longer-range precision fire was provided by the bolt-action L42A1 sniper rifle.

For clearing bunkers, the M72 LAW, 84mm Carl Gustaf & L2 fragmentation grenades, were widely used and the battalions MILAN anti-tank guided missiles, played a critical role in neutralizing Argentine defensive positions.

=== Argentine forces ===
The Argentine forces included B Company of the 7th Infantry Regiment (RI 7), part of the 10th Mechanized Infantry Brigade, along with detachments from other units. Paratroop-trained Major Carlos Carrizo Salvadores, served as RI 7’s second-in-command. The regiment, reinforced by two Marine Infantry platoons, defended positions at Mount Longdon and Wireless Ridge along with Cortley Ridge, outside Port Stanley. At San Miguel del Monte, outside Buenos Aires they had prepared for a potential conflict with Chile, training with the 601st Combat Aviation Battalion where about 50 hand-picked national servicemen and NCOs, were trained in commando tactics by Commando-trained Major Oscar Ramón Jaimet, a veteran of Operativo Independencia (Operation Independence), the counter-insurgency campaign in the northern province of Tucumán.

The defenders, mostly reservists with a year of training, were equipped with FN FAL rifles, including the heavier-barrelled, FAP light machine gun, PAM submachine guns and FN MAG general-purpose machine guns. Teniente de Navío ( Marine Captain) Sergio Andrés Dachary oversaw the heavy machine guns teams and protecting rifle squads from the Puerto Belgrano-based Batallón Infantería Comando (BICO, Marine Headquarters Battalion) and Marine Military Police that had arrived as reinforcements.

== Battle ==
=== British advance ===
3 PARA and the supporting Royal Engineers from the 9 Parachute Squadron RE crossed the hills North of Mount Simon to seize the high ground above the settlement known as Estancia House. The weather conditions were atrocious, with the Paras traversing steep slippery hillocks to the objective. Private Nick Rose, 6 Platoon, B Company under Lieutenant Jonathan Shaw:

The terrain dictated exactly how we advanced. A lot of the time if we were going along on tracks – what few we did go on – we used Indian file, which is staggered file on either side of the track, like a zig-zag. But there are great rivers of rock – big white boulders – and you have to cross them and then there's the heather and the gorse and its constantly wet. So the wind chill factor was – I think somebody said minus 40 degrees – and storm force winds and horizontal rain – a nightmare scenario. ... We are horrible, we're miserable as sin, all of us – we're missing home, want a dry fag [cigarette], warm, dry boots, a cheese and onion sandwich and a bottle of blue top milk. I used to dream of these.

Captain Matthew Selfridge from 3 PARA's B Company and Captain Robbie Burns from the 9th Parachute Squadron (Royal Engineers) set up a patrol base near Murrell Bridge, two kilometres west of Mount Longdon on 3 June, protected by 4 Platoon (under Lieutenant Ian Bickerdike) also from B Company. From their forward operating base, Selfridge and Burns sent out patrols to scout and disrupt the Argentine positions on Mount Longdon. During one of these earlier missions, Lance-Corporal John Hare of 2 Troop, Royal Engineers, was seriously wounded.

Terry Peck, a former member of the Falkland Islands Defence Force (FIDF), participated in these reconnaissance and patrol operations. In early June, while pretending to have lost his way while riding his motorbike, he engaged in conversation with a group of five conscripts under the command of Corporal Remigio Gerónimo Díaz of the 1st Rifle Platoon from B Company 7th Regiment. These soldiers had been assigned to guard supplies that had been airlifted forward and were resting in the sun after consuming several cans of beer and tinned meals at the eastern end of Mount Longdon.

Shortly after this, Peck, while leading a close-target reconnaissance patrol (under Corporal Peter Hadden) from Murrell Bridge, mistakenly opened fire on Sergeant John Pettinger's patrol in the nearby area, which also belonged to 3 PARA's D Company. No British casualties were fortunately recorded in this particular case of friendly fire.

During the night of June 4–5, a three-man British patrol from D Company, comprising Corporal Jerry Phillips with Privates Richard Absolon and Bill Hayward, was deployed to the northern slopes of Mount Longdon. Their objective was to infiltrate the position then held by Sub-Lieutenant Juan Baldini's 1st Platoon on the western slopes and capture a prisoner for intelligence gathering purposes. The British patrol was supported by a battery of six 105mm field guns, to provided covering fire. The British snipers involved targeted Baldini's command postn and fired a 66mm anti-tank rocket at a mortar position under the command of Corporal Óscar Carrizo. In response, the Argentine forces returned fire, subjecting the British patrol to machine gun and mortar fire. Despite this exchange, no casualties were recorded on either side.

The Argentine 7th Infantry Regiment's Reconnaissance Platoon, led by Second Lieutenant Francisco Ramón Galíndez-Matienzo, was stationed on Wireless Ridge but could not carry out their own patrols, as they had been designated as the reserve force for the area. Instead, Argentine Army Commando and National Gendarmerie units, typically assigned to deep reconnaissance missions, assumed this responsibility.

In the early hours of June 7, a combined patrol from the 601 Commando Company and the 601 National Gendarmerie Special Forces Squadron advanced toward the Murrell Bridge following intelligence reports from Major Jaimet indicating enemy activity in the area. At the same time, two British patrols, led by Corporals Peter Hadden and Mark Brown, had just arrived at a bluff on the western bank of the Murrell River to join Sergeant Ian Addle's patrol that was protecting the forward patrol base.

Shortly after, a British sentry detected movement near the bridge, prompting the three British patrols to open fire. A chaotic firefight ensued in the darkness, with both sides exchanging small arms fire, British LAW rockets and Argentine Energa rifle grenades. The engagement escalated when Captain Rubén Teófilo Figueroa's 2nd Assault Section of the 601 Commando Company initiated a counterattack. Under mounting pressure and unable to sustain their position, the British forces were forced to retreat before dawn, leaving behind a substantial quantity of their equipment. The official history of the Parachute Regiment later acknowledged the outcome of the action.

They were forced to evacuate their position rapidly, leaving behind their packs and radio, but succeeded in withdrawing without suffering any casualties. The location was checked on the evening of 8 June by another patrol, but there was no sign of the packs or radio, which meant the battalion's radio net could have been compromised.

From then on, British patrols were mounted closer to their own lines.

That same night, an eight-man section led by Corporal Oscar Nicolás Albornoz-Guevara from the 4th Regiment's C Company, stationed on Two Sisters, attempted to scout and map the British positions near Estancia House. However, they were spotted by British sentries, and 3 PARA's Mortar Platoon successfully repelled the Argentine patrol.

Nevertheless, despite evidence of Argentine patrolling, Colonel Pike and his company commanders on the eve of battle still held the Argentine field-grade officers and NCOs in low regard and did not expect them to put up much resistance. For this reason, the British hoped to surprise the Argentine platoon and section commanders by advancing as close to their forward platoon as possible under cover of darkness, before rushing the Argentine trenches. The three major objectives – 'Fly Half', 'Full Back' and 'Wing Forward' – were named after positions in Rugby football. B Company would attack through 'Fly Half' and proceed to 'Full Back', while A Company, followed by C Company if necessary, would do the same that night on Wireless Ridge.

Private Fabián Passaro of B Company served with Baldini's 1st Platoon and remembers Argentine morale at the time on the western end of Mount Longdon:

Most of us had adjusted to what we'd been landed in, we'd adjusted to the war. But some boys [identified in the book "Two Sides of Hell/Los Dos Lados Del Infierno"] were still very depressed and, in many cases, were getting worse all the time. Of course, we were very fed up with wearing the same clothes for so many days, going without a shower, being so cold, eating badly. It was too many things together, quite apart from our natural fear of the war, the shelling and all that. But I think some of us were adapting better than others. There were kids who were very worried, and I tried to buoy them up a bit. 'Don't worry,' I told them. 'Nothing will happen, we're safe here. 'Don't you see they could never get right up here? There's one thousand of us; if they try to climb, we'll see them, we'll shoot the shit out of them."

When 3 PARA's B Company (under Major Mike Argue) fixed bayonets to storm the Argentine 1st Platoon positions on Mount Longdon, they found themselves trapped in a minefield. British sappers subsequently counted some 1,500 anti-personnel mines that Lieutenant Diego Arreseigor's platoon of Sappers from the 10th Mechanized Engineer Company had laid along the western and northern slopes of Mount Longdon. Corporal Peter Cuxson recalled,

but only two exploded because the rest were frozen. Otherwise, the final battle for Port Stanley would have been an altogether different story.

=== Assault on Mount Longdon ===
As dusk fell, 3 PARA advanced to their start lines and commenced a four-hour march toward their objectives. While B Company approached the western slopes of Mount Longdon, Corporal Brian Milne triggered a antipersonnel mine, alerting Sub-Lieutenant Juan Baldini's 1st Platoon. While the bulk of Baldini's platoon were still in their tents inside their sleeping bags, Corporal Carlos Roberto Cascio was on sentry duty and he opened fire sounding the general alarm before he roused up the men from his rifle section. These Argentine troops soon emerged from their tents and opened fire on the British just as Lieutenant Ian Bickerdike's No. 4 Platoon arrived in the middle of the Argentine platoon defensive position. At the same time, there was much initial confusion in the Argentine 3rd Platoon sector with Sergeant Rolando Mario Spizuoco ordering Private Félix Benjamín Barreto armed with a FAP light-machine-gun and others to cease firing for he at first believed they were opening fire on fellow soldiers from the 1st Rifle Platoon.

During the engagement in the Argentine 1st Platoon sector, Corporal Stewart McLaughlin was spotted eliminating an Argentine 7.62mm machine gun positioned on high ground overlooking the western slopes.

Lieutenant Jonathan Shaw's No. 6 Platoon, positioned on B Company's right flank, secured the summit of 'Fly Half' without resistance. However, they had overlooked several Argentine soldiers from the 3rd Platoon, who later fired on the platoon's rear, causing several casualties before the area was finally secured. Meanwhile, intense hand-to-hand combat erupted in the 1st Platoon sector, lasting three hours until the Paras successfully forced the defenders out.

Across the 1st Platoon's position, small groups of soldiers were locked in desperate combat. B Company methodically eliminated the Argentine defensive positions. Privates Ben Gough and Dominic Gray managed to crawl to an Argentine bunker and position themselves beside it as the Argentine Marines inside fired at the British. The two Paras each "posted" a grenade through the firing slit before storming the bunker. Both soldiers were mentioned in despatches for their actions during the battle.

Marine Corporal Carlos Rafael Colemil was part of the forward defence and fought as a sniper:

A British soldier climbed over the rock which supported the accommodation bunker of the 105mm gun crew, and from there he was silhouetted. He screamed like he was giving out orders. I aimed and fired and he fell, then Conscript Daniel Ferrandis alerted me to the approach of three British soldiers on the flank. I observed with a night sight; they were very close. I saw one of them was carrying a gun with a bipod; he fell at the first shot and shouted. Another man approached him and I fired again and also got him ... Many people fell to the ground screaming, but soon the enemy was aware of my presence and every time I fired a shot I received a great deal of fire in response. Not long after my main action, I was wounded ... We could also hear the cries for help from the Rasit radar operator Sergeant Roque Nista, who was wounded. I could hear Sergeant Omar Cabral, who was a sniper: he was also firing.

According to the account of Private Victor José Bruno, Sub-Lieutenant Baldini was killed as he tried to clear a stoppage from a machine gun. "The Lieutenant pushed us back and stood up trying to unlock the barrel but then he was shot in his belly by enemy fire", he recalled in an interview with Eduardo César Gerding of the Nottingham Malvinas Group. Corporal Dario Ríos was found lying dead with his platoon commander and Baldini's weapon and boots were removed for the use of British parachute soldiers. Also killed in the initial fighting was Cavalry Sergeant and Army Green Beret Jorge Alberto Ron (according to Private Altieri who was wounded in the blast that killed the NCO) from the 10th Armoured Cavalry Reconnaissance Squadron and the Argentine forward artillery observation officer, Lieutenant Alberto Rolando Ramos, whose last message was that his position was surrounded. Sub-Lieutenant Baldini was awarded the Argentine Nation to the Valour in Combat Medal.

==== Argentine reinforcements ====
When First Lieutenant Enrique Eneas Neirotti's 3rd Platoon on the southern half and Staff Sergeant Raúl Antonio González's 2nd Platoon on the northern half of the mountain were on the verge of being overrun, reinforcements arrived from 2nd Lieutenant Hugo Aníbal Quiroga's 1st Platoon of the 10th Engineer Company stationed at 'Full Back.' Despite intense fighting in this sector, many Argentine positions on the mountain's saddle held firm. The recently arrived engineers with their head-mounted night sights were particularly effective, causing heavy losses among the advancing Paras.

Private Nick Rose in 6 Platoon recalls:

Pete Gray stood up and went to throw a grenade and he was shot by a sniper in his left forearm. We thought the grenade had gone off. We punched his arm down onto the ground to staunch the bleeding, believing he'd lost half his right forearm and hand, but it was still there and his arm bent at the forearm instead of the elbow – a horrible thing to watch. ...There's 'incoming' everywhere, loads of stuff going down the range and then 'bang' my pal "Fester" [Tony Greenwood], gets it just above his left eye, only a yard away from me. That was a terrible thing. 'Fester' was such a lovely guy. Then it was 'Baz' Barratt. 'Baz' had gone back to try to get field dressings for Pete Gray and [as] he was coming back, 'bang', he got it in the back. This was when we just stalled as a platoon. (Jon Cooksey, op. cit., p. 66)

Argentine resistance was strong and well organized. At the centre of the mountain were Marine conscripts Jorge Maciel and Jorge Inchauspe in a bunker with a heavy machine gun, and Marine conscripts Luis Fernández and Sergio Giuseppetti with night-scope equipped rifles.

==== Action of Sergeant Ian McKay ====
After 3 Para had secured their initial objective, 4 Platoon was ordered to clear the enemy from the northern flank of a long east–west ridge, which was defended by well-concealed machine gun positions. As the platoon advanced, they came under heavy fire, suffering casualties. Realising that no further progress could be made from their exposed position, the platoon commander, Lieutenant Ian Bickerdike, ordered a withdrawal to the ridge's rocky outcrops, where elements of 5 Platoon were regrouping.

While moving forward to reconnoitre the position, Lieutenant Bickerdike and his signaller were both wounded, and command passed to Sergeant Ian McKay. Recognising the critical nature of the situation, he led an assault on the enemy position with Corporal Ian Bailey, 17-year-old Jason Burt, and another private. The attack was met with intense fire, wounding Corporal Bailey and the private. Demonstrating exceptional bravery, Sergeant McKay continued the assault, throwing grenades at the enemy position until he was killed, his body falling onto the bunker. This act relieved the pressure on both 4 and 5 Platoons, allowing them to reposition with a measure of safety. For his gallantry, Sergeant McKay was posthumously awarded the Victoria Cross, while Corporal Bailey received the Military Medal.

Peter Harclerode, a noted British historian of the Parachute Regiment who had access to the war diary of the 3rd Battalion and later authored PARA! (Arms & Armour Press, 1993), noted that McKay and his team successfully eliminated several Marine riflemen but failed to neutralize the heavy machine gun.

After Sergeant McKay’s death, Sergeant Des Fuller, the Senior NCO in the Company HQ, volunteered to take command of 4 Platoon, which included Jason Burt, the only soldier who escaped Sergeant McKay’s action unscathed and combined them with a section from 5 Platoon. Positioning a gun team on the right flank, he led another assault but without success. In recognition of his leadership, Sergeant Fuller was awarded the Military Medal. Later, Corporal McLaughlin crawled to within grenade-throwing range of the heavy machine gun but despite repeated attempts with fragmentation grenades and 66mm rockets, was unable to silence the weapon.

Major Argue's B Company ceased firing and devoted their efforts to a withdrawal from 'Fly Half' due to the difficult situation. Peter Harclerode, went on record, saying that:

Under covering fire, Nos. 4 and 5 Platoons withdrew, but another man was killed and others wounded in the process. At that point, Lieutenant Colonel Hew Pike and his 'R' Group arrived on the scene and Major Argue briefed him on the situation. Shortly afterwards, Company Sergeant-Major Weeks reported that both platoons had pulled back to a safe distance and that all the wounded had been recovered. The dead, however, had to be left where they had fallen. Meanwhile, on the southern slope of the objective, the wounded from No. 6 Platoon were being evacuated while the rest remained under cover of the rocks.

The British 3rd Commando Brigade commander, Brigadier Julian Thompson was reported to have said:

"I was on the point of withdrawing my Paras from Mount Longdon. We couldn't believe that these teenagers disguised as soldiers were causing us to suffer many casualties."

==== Argentine counterattack ====
Major Carrizo-Salvadores on 'Full Back' had remained in touch with the Argentine commanders in Port Stanley:

Around midnight I asked RHQ for infantry reinforcements, and I was given a rifle platoon from Captain Hugo García's C Company. Lieutenant Raúl Fernando Castañeda gathered the sections of his platoon, hooked around First Sergeant Raúl González's 2nd Platoon that was already fighting and delivered a counterattack [at about 2am local time]. The Platoon fought with great courage in fierce hand-to-hand combat and the battle raged for two more hours, but gradually the enemy broke contact and withdrew while being engaged by artillery strikes.

Major Carrizo-Salvadores manoeuvred Castañeda's reinforced platoon to close with 4 and 5 Platoons; meanwhile, under the direction of Corporal Jorge Daniel Arribas, part of Castañeda's platoon converged on the British aid post. Colour Sergeant Brian Faulkner, seeing that more than 20 wounded Paras on the western slopes of the mountain were about to fall into the hands of the Argentines, deployed anyone fit enough to defend the position.

"I picked four blokes and got up on this high feature, and as I did so this troop of twenty or thirty Argentines [in fact a reinforced section of 12 to 15 riflemen under Corporal Arribas] were coming towards us. We just opened fire on them. We don't know how many we killed, but they got what they deserved because none of them were left standing when we'd finished with them." said Faulkner.

For his conduct, Colour Sergeant Faulkner was awarded the Distinguished Conduct Medal.

According to Corporal Jorge Arribas, two men (Privates Jose Luis Del Hierro and Alfredo Gatton) in his rifle section were killed in this action. Although no Argentine counterattack was reported by British military historian Martin Middlebrook in his book, Peter Harclerode and Nicholas Van Der Bijl in their more extensive research confirm B Company 3 PARA was forced to withdraw to the western lower slopes of Mount Longdon for a considerable time in order to reorganize. The Argentine Army engineers under Lieutenant Quiroga had earlier on been bought much valuable time by moving forward and stabilizing the existing line in front of the remnants of First Lieutenant Neirotti's platoon.

==== British resume the attack ====
Following the fighting on 'Fly Half' and the withdrawal of Nos. 4 and 5 Platoons, 29 Commando Regiment provided artillery support from Mount Kent. Subsequently, the area was flanked, where despite being under heavy fire, the remnants of 4 and 5 Platoons, led by Lieutenant Mark Cox, advanced toward their objective, 'Full Back'. During this push, they encountered resistance from Lieutenant Raúl Casteñeda's platoon, specifically Corporal Julio Nardielo Mamani's section, sustaining several casualties. Undeterred, Lieutenant Cox and Private Kevin Connery stormed an Argentine bunker, killing three enemy combatants. As this position was being cleared, Private Gray suffered a headshot injury but refused evacuation until Major Argue had successfully consolidated the captured positions on 'Fly Half'.

Recognising the risk of further losses, the Paras were unable to advance further and were ordered to fall back to the western end of Mount Longdon. Major David Collett's A Company was then tasked with moving through B Company to launch a final assault on the heavily defended eastern objective, 'Full Back', from the west. Support Company provided covering fire during this operation. This coordinated effort aimed to maintain momentum while minimizing further casualties in the face of determined Argentine resistance. Lieutenant David Wright and Second Lieutenant Ian Moore mustered their platoons near the western summit then cleared the remaining Argentine positions.

During the clearing of these positions by A Company, Corporal McLaughlin was injured by a recoilless gun fired from "Rough Diamond" and while en route to the aid post, both Corporal McLaughlin and Lance Corporal Pete Higgs were killed by an 81mm round fired by First Sergeant Mario Ricardo Alcaide's Mortar Platoon.

The Argentines mounted a last-ditch defence of "Full Back", where, despite being wounded, Corporal Manuel Adan Medina from Castañeda's platoon took charge of the recoilless rifle and targeted a MILAN launcher near the western summit killing three Paratroopers: Corporal "Ginge" McCarthy, Privates West and Heddicker. A Company cleared 'Full Back' in 45 minutes of skilful fighting. Their only casualty being a man slightly wounded by the explosion of his own grenade. The remaining Argentine defenders ran off in the direction of Wireless Ridge.

By the time the survivors of Castañeda's 46-man platoon managed to retreat from the mountain, they were utterly exhausted, having suffered six killed and twenty-one wounded during their counterattack. Among them, Private Leonardo Rondi stood out as he wore a maroon beret taken from a dead of Parachute Regiment soldier. Rondi, who had evaded groups of Paras to deliver messages to Castañeda's section leaders after the radio operator was shot, found the body of a Para behind a rock and took the fallen soldier's beret and rifle, which he later presented to the Argentine commanders as war trophies.

For his courage and dedication, Rondi was awarded the Argentine Nation to the Valour in Combat Medal.

Lieutenant Hugo Quiroga's platoon of engineers suffered one killed (Private José Domingo Curima) and half-a-dozen wounded (Platoon Sergeant Juan Carlos Insaurralde badly wounded in the chest, Corporal Walter Calderon hit in the hand, Private Claudio Jesús Hefner (the radio operator) hit in the arm and Private Jorge Alejandro Lezcano who very nearly lost a hand. The platoon commander and Corporal Julio César Oviedo were tossed into the air and knocked unconscious during a softening-up bombardment in the action, with Quiroga only recovering his wits after being given some whisky in the freezing night.

== Aftermath ==
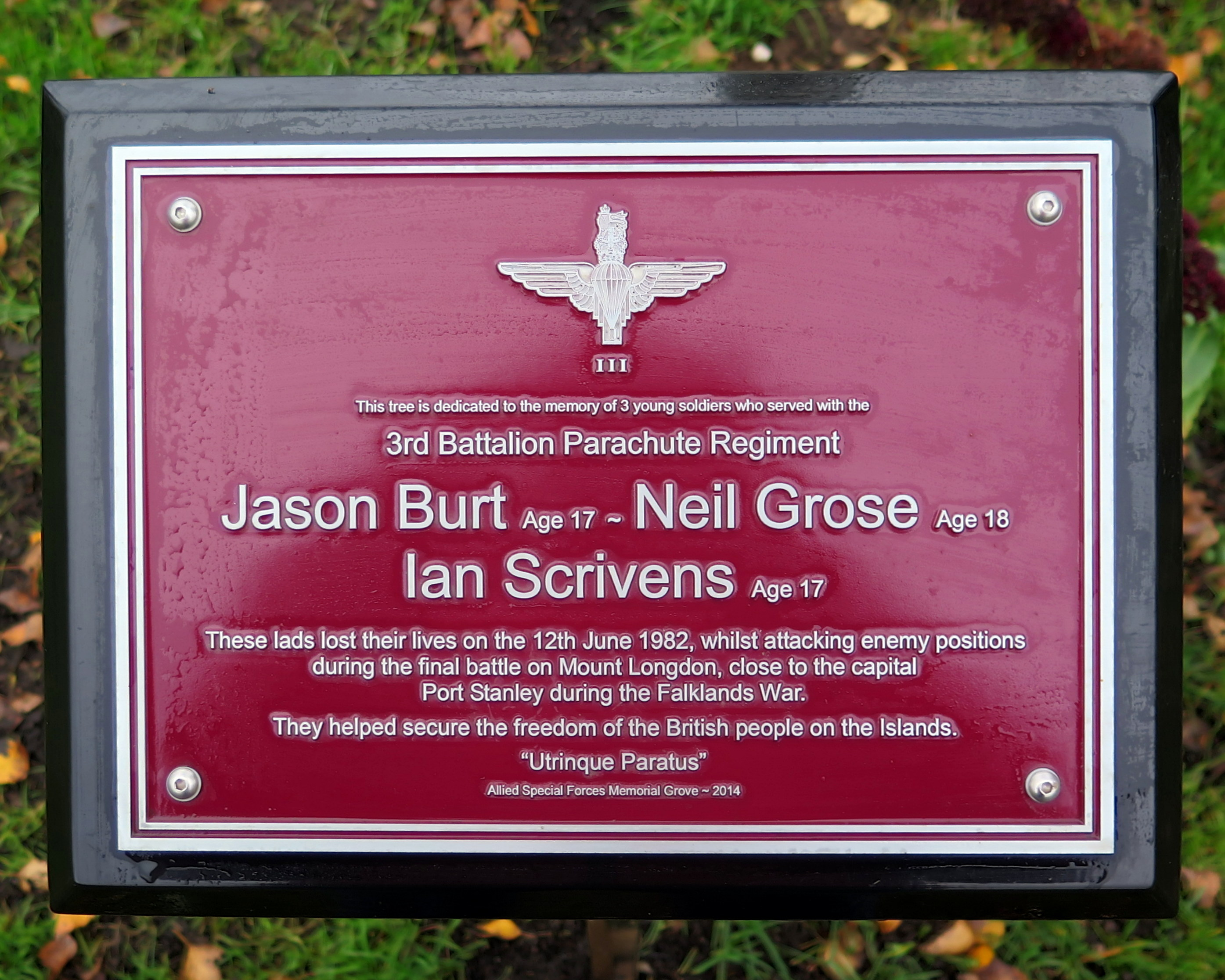
National Memorial Arboretum, plaque to Jason, Neil & Ian

The twelve-hour battle was costly for both sides. 3 PARA lost 17 soldiers, including a Royal Engineer attached to the unit. Among the dead, privates Ian Scrivens and Jason Burt were just 17, and Private Neil Grose was killed on his 18th birthday. Forty British paratroopers were initially reported wounded, with B Company's Private Mick Southall noting that only one NCO, Colin Edwards, remained standing in Major Mike Argue's company after the intense night-fighting. "We took a hammering," Southall said, with soldiers promoted in the field to replace fallen leaders.

Lance-Corporal Paul Moore, a parachute engineer who took part in the battle, says that apart from those killed and wounded in the battalion, another 30 or more British paratroopers suffered minor injuries. Several dozen Paras were concussed and temporarily rendered non-combat effective after being hit on their helmets and webbing during the night battle and subsequent Argentine bombardments, or were immobilised by the cold and wet conditions and evacuated, with Sergeant Graham Colbeck from the Milan Anti-tank Platoon reporting the British battalion strength was reduced by some 120 men.

Subsequent Argentine shelling over the following two days killed four more Paras and a REME craftsman, and wounded a further seven. Argentine counter fire from Wireless Ridge during the night of 13–14 June caused several additional casualties in the British parachute battalion according to Surgeon-Major Rick Jolly, the commander of the British field hospital at San Carlos. Earlier, on 12 June, Royal Marine Sergeant Peter Thorpe was wounded while assisting injured artillerymen trapped in a Snowcat disabled in a minefield.

The Argentines suffered 31 dead, 120 wounded, and 50 taken prisoner.

Lance-Corporal Vincent Bramley was patrolling the western half of Mount Longdon when he was confronted with the full horror of the night combat. The 3 PARA NCO and keen writer stumbled upon the bodies of five Paratroopers killed by Neirotti's 3rd Platoon.

A few bullets whizzed overhead and smashed into the rocks. A corporal shouted that Tumbledown was firing at us. We ran into a tight gap in the path [and] came to an abrupt halt, as it was a dead end. Four or five bodies lay sprawled there, close together. This time they were our own men: the camouflaged Para smocks hit my eyes immediately. CSM [Company-Sergeant-Major] Weeks was standing over them like a guardian, screaming at some of his men to cover the further end of the path and a small crest. The CSM and Sergeant P [Pettinger] exchanged quick words. I wasn't listening; my mind was totally occupied with looking into the crags for the enemy. I turned and looked at our own lads, dead on the ground, mowed down when they tried to rush through this gap. I felt both anger and sadness. The CSM's face showed the strain of having seen most of his company either wounded or shot dead. That night's fighting was written in every line of his face.

In 2025, Jimmy Morham in an extensive interview summarized his experiences as a corporal in 3 PARA's B Company, recalling the important role of Support Company as stretcher-bearers and ammunition porters in the battle, the loss of brave friends killed or wounded, the Argentine artillery bombardment as well as the determined resistance on the part of the defenders:

We had been stomped rotten on that thing and we lost a hell of a lot of guys ... 23 in total in the 3 days we were on that feature and we had 60 odd wounded, which is a hell of a figure for a night attack and then a couple of days on the mountain ... At the end of the day to win a battle you have to basically beat them before the enemy does. And at that stage they decide I'm not hanging around here. Otherwise I'm going to die in place. I'm going to leg it. Or they decide to stay ... And a lot of those Argentinian guys did ... I can remember our (bunker-busting) team coming down on this position throwing whatever we could at them And the minute the stomping stopped, the Argentine fire on that particular position would start again ... Those guys on the whole were going to stick it out. They were in cracking well defended positions and they knew it well.

== Awards and citations ==
=== Argentine forces ===
- Argentine Nation to the Valour in Combat Medal
  - Private Leonardo Rondi

=== British forces ===
The battalion's decorations for the action were:

- Victoria Cross to Sergeant Ian McKay †
- Distinguished Service Order to Lieutenant-Colonel Hew Pike
- Military Cross to:
  - Major Mike Argue
  - Major David Collett
- Distinguished Conduct Medal to:
  - Colour Sergeant Brian Faulkner
  - Sergeant John Pettinger
- Military Medal to:
  - Sergeant Desmond Fuller
  - Corporal Ian Bailey
  - Private Richard Absolon †
- Mentioned in despatches to: Lance Corporal Leonard Carver, Private Kevin Connery, Private Adam Corneille, Lieutenant Mark Cox, Major Peter Dennison, Private Darren Gough, Private Dominic Gray, Lance Corporal (Acting Corporal) Stephen Harding-Dempster, Private Patrick Harley, Lance Corporal Christopher Lovett †, Second Lieutenant Ian Moore, Corporal Thomas Noble, Corporal Jeremy Phillips, Lieutenant (Acting Captain) Matthew Selfridge, Corporal John Sibley
