= Carlos Carrizo Salvadores =

Argentine Army officer and police chief

Carlos Eduardo del Valle Carrizo Salvadores is a retired Argentine Army middle-rank officer and former police chief of Jujuy Province in Argentina.

In 2016, an Argentine High Court overturned his life sentence for his role in the so-called Massacre of Capilla del Rosario (Rosario Chapel Massacre), acquitting him of all charges for which he had served prison time.

== Formative years ==
Carrizo Salvadores was born on 7 August 1942 in San Miguel de Tucumán. His parents resettled in Catamarca soon after his birth. As a child, he spent his formative years at Colegio Belgrano.

Carlos Carrizo Salvadores enrolled in the Colegio Militar de la Nación in 1959 as an officer cadet and entered the Argentine Army in 1962, as an infantry second lieutenant. Before being promoted to captain in 1974, he passed paratroop qualification as a full lieutenant and was transferred to the 4th Airborne Infantry Brigade where he served as a company commander with the 17th Airborne Infantry Regiment.

== Rosario Chapel Massacre ==
Between 10 and 12 August 1974, Carrizo Salvadores was accused of being in command of the Argentine Army and police forces that took part in the Capilla del Rosario Massacre, where he was serving as regimental adjutant in the 17th Airborne Infantry Regiment. Some 16 rural separatist guerrillas of the People's Revolutionary Army (ERP-PRT) who were preparing to attack the airborne infantry barracks in order to seize the armoury along with uniforms were captured after a gunfight with the local Army airborne infantry garrison near Capilla del Rosario. Two local men riding bicycles alerted the nearest police station and fighting soon broke out with the police and army reinforcements. Some of the ERP guerrillas managed to escape into the surrounding woods. Others were captured nearby. The remainder attempted to resist in the Capilla del Rosario area but were soon surrounded by 300 Army paratroopers and policemen and forced to surrender.

According to the authors of 'Detenidos-Aparecidos: Presas y Presos Políticos desde Trelew a la Dictadura' (Santiago Garaño & Werner Pertot, Editorial Biblos, 2007) the rural guerrillas fought until they ran out of ammunition, at which point they surrendered. They were soon beaten up by the parachute soldiers and police in revenge for their own losses in the gunbattle (2 policemen killed and 6 wounded) and all were subsequently shot dead. The ERP guerrillas were executed under orders from chief-of-staff of the 3rd Army Corps, Major-General José Antonio Vaquero, who claimed the captured guerrillas had forfeited their rights as prisoners-of-war for not complying with the Geneva Convention by wearing Argentine Army uniforms captured in earlier raids.

== Falklands War ==
Major Carlos Carrizo Salvadores distinguished himself in the Battle of Mount Longdon, during the Falklands War, when as Second-in-Command of the 7th Mechanized Infantry Regiment (RI Mec 7), he along with the 7th Infantry Regiment's B Company (B/RI Mec 7) defended the Argentine stronghold overlooking Murrell River and later led a hastily formed platoon of conscripts from the remnants of his rifle companies to recover the lost positions on Wireless Ridge.

He had earlier personally, during the month of April 1982, taken part in the exhaustive task that was the construction of his command bunker alongside the men of his tactical headquarters section, according to one of his soldiers, Private Guillermo Alberto Velez from the Headquarters & Support Company who was interviewed in the best-selling book 'Los Chicos De La Guerra: Hablan Los Soldados Que Estuvieron En Malvinas' (Daniel Kon, Editorial Galerna, 1982).

Major Carrizo-Salvadores would later explain that he and Captain Eduardo López-Astore (the B Rifle Company commander) as well as other field-grade officers in RI Mec 7 did their best to arrange some measure of comfort for their conscripts on Mount Longdon and nearby Wireless Ridge, "We took good care of the personnel. We did what we could do to set an example. Captain Eduardo López was there with the platoons, with news-updates and nougat bars. The soldiers had everything you can imagine in their kitbags, including thermos flasks and transistor radios. Some of the soldiers heard that the British had disembarked at San Carlos and captured Goose Green by tuning radios on to the BBC (British Broadcasting Cooperation). In the mornings the soldiers had a mug of the green Guarani herb mate which contains around the same amount of caffeine as a cup of coffee; it is stimulating and helps register a feeling of fullness. Meals were served in the open and consumed in mugs. I remember that mutton and pasta figured largely on the menu. There was a strict ration of one ratpack per man per week, eaten slowly to make it last."

On 23 May 1982, as A, B and C Companies of the 7th Infantry Regiment had been in their positions out in the cold for 41 days with little hot food, the Regimental Adjutant (Captain Raúl Eugenio Daneri) ordered that the conscripts in the rifle companies take turns in preparing and serving the daily hot food meant for the 7th Regiment. "It was my turn to be the mess cook; we took turns, I think, weekly. That way I could get a little extra food. Although going out in the cold to serve the others was awful, Roberto Maldonado (my foxhole companion) and I would fill three water canteens with yerba mate tea and use them as hot water bottles (at night)—that way we had something warm to drink all morning," acknowledges then Private Miguel Savage, a mortarman in C Company on the western end of Wireless Ridge.

While commanding his troops on Mount Longdon prior to the final battles in the ground war, he received the unwelcome news of his father's passing in Catamarca Province but kept this to himself, not wanting to elicit attention from his brigade commander and be given compassionate reassignment elsewhere in the Falklands/Malvinas or worse still, sent back to Argentina.

During the battles for Mount Longdon and Wireless Ridge, the attacking British Paratroopers had to several times take part in close quarter combat and fight off counterattacks in what is still regarded as the bloodiest British ground action since the Korean War. Major Carrizo Salvadores had proven reluctant to abandon the feature and only did so only when the attacking British Paratroopers got within 100 metres from his command bunker and only after a near-miss from a MILAN anti-tank missile around 07.00 local time.

During the fighting on Longdon, the quartermaster officer in the 7th Regiment, Captain Guillermo Santiago Grau also showed immense courage, personally driving his jeep up the eastern slopes of Mount Longdon under British naval bombardment and was responsible for evacuating a total of 67 wounded in Captain López-Astore's B Rifle Company.

In all, the Argentine defenders on Mount Longdon suffered 31 killed, 120 wounded and 50 captured while the British lost 23 men killed and some 80 wounded.

== Meeting with former British Parachute Regiment soldier ==
In September 2022, thanks to the assistance provided by the Argentine Embassy in London, British veteran Mark Eyles-Thomas, author of the book on the battle, Sod That for a Game of Soldiers (Kenton Publishing, 2007), who had fought in the Falklands as a 17-year-old paratrooper with 3 PARA, traveled to Argentina with his wife Patricia to return to his family the helmet of an Argentine soldier (Daniel Francisco Sirtori) who had committed suicide during the post-war period and to the daughter he left behind, Virginia Sirtori. He then got a chance to meet retired Colonel Carlos Carrizo Salvadores and his wife Norma, and several other Argentine veterans. Carrizo and his wife were able to take the British couple out to a gala dinner twice at the exclusive Círculo Militar and then on board the museum ship ARA Presidente Sarmiento, where both veterans were able to relive their experiences during the fierce battle that was Mount Longdon.
