= 7th Infantry Regiment (Argentina) =

Argentine military unit

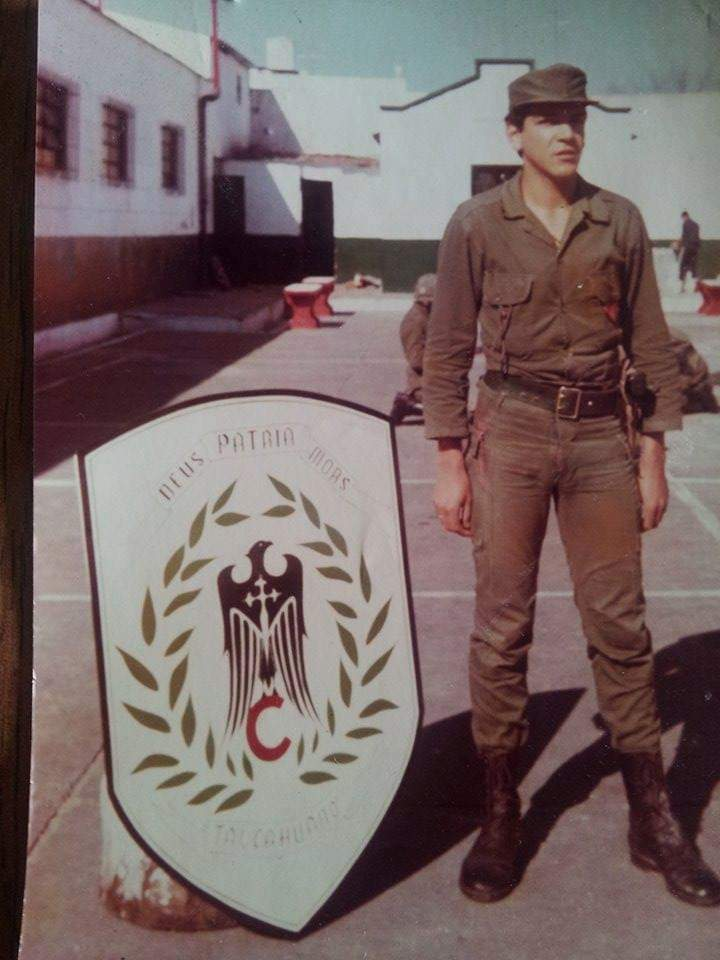
- Country: Argentina
- Branch: Army
- Type: Mechanized infantry
- Garrison/HQ: Arana
- Patron: Colonel Pedro Conde
- Engagements: South American wars of independence; Falklands War; Battle of Wireless Ridge; Battle of Mount Longdon

The 7th Infantry Regiment is a unit of the Argentine Army (Ejército Argentino) based at Arana (La Plata), Buenos Aires Province, Argentina. The unit's full official name is 7th "Coronel Conde" Mechanized Infantry Regiment, and it is part of the 1st Armored Brigade, 3rd Army Division.

The regiment fought in the South American wars of independence and in the Falklands War (Spanish: Guerra de las Malvinas/Guerra del Atlántico Sur), as part of the 10th Brigade, during the battles of Mount Longdon and Wireless Ridge.

== Origins ==
The 7th Regiment traces its origins back to November 1810. At that time, it was known as the Cochabamba Infantry Regiment in Bolivia, and comprised locals. The Mayor of Chuquisaca, Francisco Rivero, was designated its commanding officer, with the rank of colonel. In June 1811, the unit was renamed No. 7 Infantry Regiment, and had its baptism of fire on 20 June 1811 at Huaqui, under the command of Lieutenant-Colonel Bolaños. Given the scarcity of experienced officers and the lack of training among the infantry fighting the well-armed and disciplined Spanish-backed enemy, the 7th Regiment soldiers could not maintain their assigned positions and soon joined in the retreat of the Patriot forces with the unit being disbanded in the aftermath of defeat. However, in 1812, it was officially announced that plans were in progress for the reformation the regiment with horseback grenadiers and supporting infantry recruited from the patriots residing in the Banda Oriental Province.

== War of Independence ==
On 31 May 1813 the 7th Regiment was officially formed in Buenos Aires, under the command of Lieutenant-Colonel Toribio de Luzuriaga. Sent to Upper Peru in late 1814, it suffered heavy losses in the Second Battle of the Sipe Sipe fighting Spanish Royalist forces.

The combat unit was soon reformed and placed under the command of Lieutenant-Colonel Pedro Conde. On 19 January 1817, the companies of the regiment formed the vanguard of the patriot forces of General Soler. They crossed the Andes through the Paso de Los Patos, taking part in the Battles of Achupayas, Putaendo, Las Coimas and Guardia Vieja. El 12 February 1817, the formation played an important role in the victory obtained during the Battle of Chacabuco against Spanish backed forces. The combat companies were then placed under the command of General Bernardo O' Higgins, taking part in the liberation of southern Chile, fighting at the Battles of Gavilán, Carampague and Talcahuano. Durante the Second Battle of Cancha Rayada, the regiment held firm despite a surprise enemy counterattack.

The regiment later took part in the Liberation of Peru as part of the 1st Division under General Las Heras and later General Arenales.

== Post-independence ==
On 17 April 1917, the 7th Regiment boarded trains at Estación Muñiz taking them to their new home base of La Plata.

On 23 December 1975, several hundred Marxist guerrillas from People's Revolutionary Army (Ejército Revolucionario del Pueblo or ERP) and their underground supporters, staged an all-out battle with the Monte Chingolo-based 601st Arsenal Battalion and army and police reinforcements some nine miles (14 km) from Buenos Aires and simultaneously raided four police stations and the La Plata Barracks of the 7th Regiment. 63 guerrillas, seven army troops and three policemen were reported killed in the ensuing gun-battles.In addition 20 civilians were killed in the crossfire. Many of the civilian deaths occurred when the guerrillas and supporting left-wing militants burned 15 city busesnear the arsenal to block reinforcements from the Buenos Aires-based Rapid Deployment Force in the form of the then 10th Motorized Infantry Brigade.

== Preparations for war ==
Throughout 1981, the 7th Mechanized Infantry Regiment as part of the 10th Mechanized Infantry Brigade (under Brigadier-General Oscar Luis Jofre) found itself building up and training for war with Chile. There were trips to the field-firing area at San Miguel del Monte, and the senior soldiers were given specialist weapons courses, MAG machine-guns, FAP light-machine-guns, 120-mm and 81-mm mortars, radios and RASIT ground-surveillance radar.

At the end of their forty-five days of basic training, Private Vicente José Bruno was one of the 1981 intake regarded as the best soldiers. Forty-five of the conscripts and half-a-dozen NCOs in the 7th Regiment were selected to form a Ranger-type platoon within the 7th Regiment. During 1981, a Commando/Ranger course had been introduced in the 10th Brigade. Brigadier Oscar Jofre had decided that an airlanding special operations platoon would be formed for each of his regiments. Major Oscar Ramón Jaimet, the Operations Officer of the 6th Mechanized Infantry Regiment, took over the formation of these helicopter-borne platoons of hand-picked conscripts and NCOs. Jaimet, a dedicated professional soldier had served behind the separatist Marxist People's Revolutionary Army guerrilla lines as an Army Green Beret in the Tucumán Province in 1975.

Private Santiago Fabian Gauto, a soldier of Guarani Indian heritage, was selected to be part of the Ranger-type platoon (under First Lieutenant Mario Gabriel Dotto) for the 7th Regiment that included learning how to stop enemy reinforcements arriving by train:

We had instructions at night in all weathers. It was freezing in winter. We were taught how to make and plant booby-traps, we did lots of extra shooting and had to strip and assemble weapons while blindfolded. They even taught us how to stop an electric train, which was really weird to us. Maybe one day I'll go to the station and stop one!

Many regulars and conscripts in the 10th Brigade were sons of Italian migrants, patriotic and adventurous young men fired up by patriotism and stories of the Second World War. In an interview with Fernando Calles from Radio Las Fores (AM 1210), Private José Vicente Bruno in 2022 talked proudly about his uncle that had fought as part of the Axis Italian Army in the North African Campaign during the Second World War.

The 7th Mechanized Infantry Regiment was selected to take part in a helicopter-borne exercise with 601 Combat Aviation Battalion. Private Jorge Alberto Altieri:

I was issued with a FAL 7.62 millimetre rifle. Other guys were given FAP light machineguns and others got PAMs [submachine guns]. The main emphasis in shooting was making every bullet count. I was also shown how to use a bazooka, how to make and lay booby-traps, and how to navigate at night, and we went on helicopter drills, night and day attacks and ambushes.

Service was not always harsh though, with the local soldiers of the 10th Brigade permitted to return to their homes for dinner and weekends during quiet periods. Private Omar Anibal Brito (KIA), from the regiment's B Company, would not be so lucky; having several run-ins with his superiors, and even going AWOL, he would miss out on the rewards for good behaviour, spending much time in the lock-up cell of the Regiment instead.

There was a nearby school and to this the 7th Regiment provided skilled labour in the form of Private Antonio Francisco Belmonte and others as part of a Hearts and Minds campaign with Belmonte recalling, "They also had a system where conscripts with certain trades - painters, electricians, builders and the like - were sent outside to help on civilian projects such as repairing and decorating schools. For some reason they sent me to work on a school and I missed a lot of training, particularly the big manoeuvres, because of it. On one occasion a big exercise was coming up which I very much wanted to attend, but the headmistress of the school told our authorities she wanted her work finished and we were ordered to stay and do it and miss the exercise."

The culmination of the training cycle for the conscripts consisted of a division-sized mechanized infantry/armoured assault with the accompanying 1st Armoured Cavalry Brigade along with supporting IAI Dagger fighter-bombers from the Argentine Air Force in the General Acha Desert in La Pampa Province in October 1981. Private Claudio Alberto Carbone from the 7th Mechanized Regiment recalls the major exercise:

Halfway through my service there was a really big exercise involving the 10th Brigade. I don't know what the top brass had in mind at the time - whether it was a rehearsal for the Malvinas or not - but it was big. There were at least 10,000 troops involved and I had to drive a vehicle with a big cannon on it. I couldn't find the exercise area at first, then I got lost trying to find the regiment and then I got lost trying to find my company. I got there in the end and they sent me off to get a truck out with a field kitchen and drive that around delivering food to the infantry. When I got to the front line all the big guns were firing and the heat was unbelievable. They were holding this exercise in a desert. If it was a practice for the Malvinas, they were holding it in a very strange place. The infantry soldiers were in a very bad way. They were in a dreadful state from hunger and thirst. They were so bad with thirst they even tried to get water from the radiator of my truck. I'll never forget the dreadful state they were in.

Private Darío Miguel Pedraza says that the Special Operations Platoon in the 7th Regiment took part in a simulated helicopter-borne raid behind the opposing forces at the very start of these desert war-games in which the three opposite regimental commanders involved along with their staff were captured and extracted in this coup de main along with the participating 7th Regiment Rangers with the help of a column of tanks from the 1st Armoured Brigade that had earlier on arrived to set up and protect an extraction perimeter.

Although the brigade conducted field exercises, its duties also included ceremonial events—such as Argentine Independence Day commemorations—and security operations. The regiment also participated in sports competitions, with the 7th Regiment Commando Platoon placing third in the 10th Brigade marathon...By the end of the year, soldiers designated as Soldados Dragoneantes (equivalent to Private First Class or Temporary Corporal) were assigned as section leaders and specialist personnel, serving as machine gunners, anti-tank weapon operators, radio operators, ground-surveillance radar operators, pathfinders, and combat medics.

Private Tomás Szumilo of the 7th Regiment says, "The preparation we got (from boot-camp) before we arrived (in the islands) was good and had lasted about a month and a half, it was quite rigorous because the Regiment was very demanding of us. We were able to operate weapons and handle soldiering. In my case, due to my experience in the health industry, I became a combat medic."

Prior to their discharge, the Commando-trained soldiers in the 7th Regiment were required to do a guard duty for Brigadier-General Jofre because of the terrorist threat from Montoneros urban guerrillas still operating in Buenos Aires, "One time Brigadier-General Jofre, who commanded 10th Brigade and was also Land Forces Commander in the Malvinas, came to visit us and see something at the nearby theatre. All thirty of us were ordered to escort him and guard him. We lost our leave to look after him."

== Falklands War ==
Lieutenant-Colonel Omar Giménez's 7th Mechanized Infantry Regiment (Regimiento de Infantería Mecanizado 7 'Coronel Conde' or RI Mec 7) was deployed to the Falkland Islands, where it fought in the battles for Mount Longdon and Wireless Ridge, sustaining 36 killed and 152 wounded and around 100 taken prisoner of war.

Between 13–14 April, RI Mec 7 was flown to Stanley Airbase to relieve the 3rd Rifle Platoon (Lieutenant Héctor Edgardo Gazzolo) from Delta Company 2nd Marine Infantry Battalion (D/BIM 2) and 3rd Rifle Platoon (Lieutenant Alfredo José Imboden) from Hotel Company 3rd Marine Infantry Battalion (H/BIM 3) holding Mount Longdon and Wireless Ridge in Sector Plata (Silver). The next day, they moved to Sector Silver overlooking Murrell River and Moody Brook Barracks and the bulk of the regiment were to spend the next 62 days of the war in this sector of the Stanley front. Private José Vicente Bruno recalls Second Lieutenant Juan Domingo Baldini commandeering a truck in order to help get his 1st Rifle Platoon from B Company 7th Regiment (B/RI Mec 7) to Mount Longdon. 1st Platoon (Lieutenant Hugo Aníbal Quiroga) and 2nd Platoon (Second Lieutenant Diego Carlos Arreseigor) from the 10th Mechanized Engineer Company were assigned for sapper support. Dismounted cavalry troops and Panhards were in support from Reserva Z. GA 3 was on call via 10th Mechanized Infantry Brigade Headquarters (Brigada de Infantería Mecanizada X or Cdo/Br I Mec X).

The recalled reservists had a year of training, comprising a solid 200 days in which the conscripts in the rifle companies received relevant mentoring from their superiors while out in exercises

At Port Stanley in April and May before the British landings, the 7th Regiment companies were fortunate in they had access to hot showers which were available to them every fortnight before the British landings on 21 May. At first, the 7th Regiment on Wireless Ridge was relatively comfortable, shooting sheep and roasting them on old bed frames the soldiers had found nearby, according to Anglo-Argentinian Private Miguel Savage of the Mortar Platoon (under First Sergeant Mario Ricardo Alcaide) from C Company who was interviewed by the Scotsman in 2002.Private Guillermo Alberto Vélez from the 7th Regiment's Headquarters & Support Company maintains that he personally shot and killed 50 sheep to feed a substantial part of fellow soldiers in his Command & Support Company entrenched on Wireless Ridge.

Private Savage says he received minimal training for as he explains in his book 'Malvinas, Viaje al Pasado' (Editorial El Ateneo, 2023) his influential father had arranged with the Regimental Commander for his son to largely sit out, along with five other conscripts, their military service as handymen instead at a civilian shooting range in Buenos Aires, but that it all backfired when Savage found himself incorporated into C/RI Mec 7 and sent to defend Wireless Ridge.

Lieutenant-Colonel Giménez had selected a quiet and secluded part of Stanley Hospital for his companies to rest while getting proper hot food, but the weary soldiers found it difficult to unwind. The nervous tension of being subjected to constant bombardment and possible air attack for a long period was taking its toll. Private Jorge Alberto Andreeta from B/RI Mec 7, in an interview with the Argentinian 'Clarín' newspaper in April 2012, reported that rough punishment was indeed meted out in his unit to those caught stealing provisions or hunting sheep, but admitted that his platoon got a chance to visit this sanctuary fitted with colour tv and video cassette player, "One day they took us to the hospital, we showered and they got us to watch a film, it turned out to be a horror movie."

Under Brigadier-General Mario Menéndez's express orders as the Argentine Military Governor of the Faklands, the army engineers (under Colonel Manuel Dorrego) in Port Stanley constructed field showers for the troops that allowed the front-line units before the British landings to send companies into town on a rotating basis to take a hot shower, eat a proper meal and mend their clothes.Menéndez in his memoirs says that when the Argentine soldiers in and around Port Stanley started to go hungry through lack of bread he commandeered the local bakery that largely offset the lack of bread and that there was initially an abundance of water biscuits to supplement the diet of the troops.

There was initially a strict ration of one ration pack per soldier per week in the Regiment and stealing and going absent without leave (AWOL) attracted fairly harsh physical retribution in the form of Field Punishments. Private Jorge Alberto Altieri from Second Lieutenant Juan Baldini's 1st Rifle Platoon (B Company 7th Regiment) would claim the conscripts experienced much hunger, despite permission to go through stockpiled cold-weather tinned food rations on Mount Longdon, "During wartime, the higher ranking officers are in totally different places ... Sub Lieutenant Baldini would receive orders from Major Carrizo who was further down, to use our cold rations and that the more nutritious food we'd get when the fighting started because they didn't know if they'd be able to supply us with food. From 16 April to 11 June we fought, we'd have soup with lentils, green peas and some piece of mutton. We would tell our officer: "We can't tell the British soldiers to wait so that we could get better food and then start shooting ... We weren't properly fed prior to the fighting like we should've been, we were weakened."

Altieri would also openly defend Baldini on Argentine television in 1992 during a special broadcast marking the 10th Anniversary of the Falklands War, saying that he "denied" an invitation by a Buenos Aires radio station in 1983 to publicly "denounce" Baldini of being a torturer and Altieri went on to explain to both tv hosts, Graciela Alfano and Andrés Percivale, that although he disliked field-punishments they were "part and parcel" in the Regiment and that Baldini in the end had proven himself and had "died with his boots on".

The officers and NCOs from the 7th Regiment would later in 2007 be accused of not only torturing their conscripts on Mount Longdon and Wireless Ridge and failing to feed them but also fleeing and abandoning them when the British Parachute Regiment in the form of 3 PARA and then 2 PARA attacked. "Our own officers were our greatest enemies", says Ernesto Alberto Alonso, the president of CECIM (an anti-Argentine military veterans group) who served in Baldini's platoon. "They supplied themselves with whiskey from the pubs, but they weren't prepared for war. They disappeared when things got serious."

Former Private Ernesto Alonso in 2013 acknowledged that he was not present during the night of battle on Mount Longdon for he had been evacuated suffering from shell-shock the day before after a British artillery round landed amidst the 1st Platoon platoon positions and Alonso spent the next couple of days in Stanley Hospital recovering his wits.

The experiences in Baldini's platoon varied from soldier to soldier. Private José Luis Aparicio claims that he and others once escaped into Port Stanley where they were able to buy cigarettes, jam, bread, apples and cookies and that the corporal in charge of the section he was would allow them to shoot and eat sheep, but that in the last 20 days they hardly got any food. He also admits that the 1st Rifle Platoon was taken out of the mountain twice, in April and at the beginning of May, so that the soldiers could get a chance to shower in Port Stanley and that on the last march into town, Baldini's men were allowed to stay in the town in a requisitioned building overnight. Private Carlos Amato admits that Baldini had a net stretched outside his tent that contained tinned provisions for his men, but claims these tinned meals were of poor quality, although he would consume them after getting a fellow conscript to heat them up first and that the NCOs in the platoon had no qualms in eating the cold tinned meals made available to everybody in the 1st Platoon regardless of rank. Private Sergio Delgado claims that he hated his section leader, Corporal Geronimo Diaz from the 3rd Rifle Platoon (under First Lieutenant First Lieutenant Enrique Eneas Neirotti), but says that the NCO allowed him and four other conscripts one day to open up and drink several cans of beer that had been helicoptered forward before the British San Carlos landings. Private Alberto Carbone claims that Baldini would always get him to go and look for firewood so that the officer could heat up his food while the remainder of the 1st Platoon according to him "starved" and that Baldini "clashed with everyone" and that he was left to himself and consequently "died alone" as a result on the night of battle.Former Private José Vicente Bruno from the 1st Rifle Platoon, in an interview in 2022 with former Argentine war correspondent Nicolas Kasanzew, says that Second Lieutenant Juan Baldini had constant problems with Private Carbone that was caught having fallen asleep a number of times while on sentry duty at night for which Carbone was severely punished and that Baldini was a good officer that allowed Bruno and others to shoot and butcher sheep for the platoon and that Baldini would eat the same food and share his cigarettes despite claims to the contrary on the part of Private José Aparicio.

Major Carrizo-Salvadores would later explain that he and Captain Eduardo López-Astore (the actual B Rifle Company Commander on Mount Longdon) as well as other field-grade officers in RI Mec 7 did their best to arrange some measure of comfort for their conscripts on Mount Longdon and nearby Wireless Ridge, "We took good care of the personnel. We did what we could do to set an example. Captain Eduardo López was there with the platoons, with news-updates and nougat bars. The soldiers had everything you can imagine in their kitbags, including thermos flasks and transistor radios. Some of the soldiers heard that the British had disembarked at San Carlos and captured Goose Green by tuning radios on to the BBC (British Broadcasting Cooperation). In the mornings the soldiers had a mug of the green Guarani herb mate which contains around the same amount of caffeine as a cup of coffee; it is stimulating and helps register a feeling of fullness. Meals were served in the open and consumed in mugs. I remember that mutton and pasta figured largely on the menu. There was a strict ration of one ratpack per man per week, eaten slowly to make it last."

On 23 May, as A, B and C Companies of the 7th Infantry Regiment had been in their positions out in the cold for 41 days with little hot food, the Regimental Adjutant (Captain Raúl Eugenio Daneri) ordered that the conscripts in the rifle companies take turns in preparing and serving the daily hot food meant for the 7th Regiment. "It was my turn to be the mess cook; we took turns, I think, weekly. That way I could get a little extra food. Although going out in the cold to serve the others was awful, Roberto Maldonado (my foxhole companion) and I would fill three water canteens with yerba mate tea and use them as hot water bottles (at night)—that way we had something warm to drink all morning," acknowledges then Private Miguel Savage, a mortarman in C Company on the western end of Wireless Ridge.

On 8 June, a mortar post under Private Felix Guillermo Álvarez from the 1st Rifle Platoon B Company spotted a Close-Target-Reconnaissance Patrol from D Company 3 PARA possibly looking for items of equipment lost on the night of 6-7 June during a clash with Argentine Army Commandos near Murrell Bridge, and opened fire forcing the four British Paratroopers involved to go to ground and eventually vacate the area.

On the night of 8–9 June, a number of soldiers from the 7th Regiment's A Company deserted their positions on Wireless Ridge and after crossing a river broke into the house of Claude and Judy Molkenbuhr in Murrell Farm and completely vandalized the house, along with valuables. The four deserters involved, Privates Carlos Alberto Hornos, Pedro Vojkovic, Alejandro Vargas and Manuel Zelarayán were killed when their heavily laden wooden boat struck an anti-tank mine on the opposite bank.

On 13 June, Private Juan Carlos González from N Company 5th Marine Battalion on Tumbledown Mountain and Private Mario Ramón Luna from B Company 6th Regiment in reserve positions near Tumbledown were killed around midday by Argentine Commandos laying in ambush position near Goat Ridge in a friendly-fire incident while these deserters along with a number of others were returning from raiding the abandoned food cache that B Company 6th Regiment that had been forced to leave behind on Two Sisters Mountain while taking up new defensive positions on the night of 11-12 June. This tragedy is cited by some in Argentina as further evidence supporting the necessity of severe, immediate military discipline to prevent soldiers from leaving their defensive positions, which could otherwise lead to operational chaos or misidentification in the field.

In a 2019 interview with ‘Radio Noticias’, former Private Gustavo Alberto Placente from the 181st Military Police Company explained that the harsh field punishments that many consider were unwaranted brutal cases of torture, were absolutely necessary to keep the conscript defenders in line and save them from potential harm but most importantly to protect the lives of local civilians in Port Stanley and keep Argentine soldiers out of the abandoned houses of the Falklanders that had sought safety in the Falklands interior.Captain Miguel Ángel Romano, a reserve officer that spoke excellent English, had for this reason been sent to Port Stanley to help take charge of the 181st Military Police Company during the Argentine occupation. According to Falklander Patrick Watts from Port Stanley: "He took appropriate action against conscripts caught stealing from unoccupied dwellings and tried to help the civilian community as far as his rank would allow."

Corporal Jorge Daniel Arribas from the 1st Rifle Platoon C Company on nearby Rough Diamond on Wireless Ridge, would explain that when the moment came to execute a nocturnal counterattack in support of the Mount Longdon defenders during the Battle of Mount Longdon on the night of 11-12 June 1982, the men in his rifle platoon would certainly be up to the task, "When the time came to fight, despite the loss of weight, despite having not had any real sleep we fought so hard like as if we were these really tough Commandos, Elite Soldiers but we did it all for love of the Fatherland, for each other and for our families."

On the night of 13/14 June, The British SAS reportedly tried to infiltrate the regiment by mingling with the fleeing RI Mec 7 soldiers from Wireless Ridge, making it very difficult for the 181st Military Police Company and supporting 1st Amphibious Engineer Company to differentiate between the two in the dark. After the Argentinian surrender, that saw a bitter street brawl take place between British soldiers from 3 PARA and elements from the 7th Regiment, the soldiers along with many of theirs superiors were taken back to Argentina on board the British cruise liner 'Canberra'.

A British report in 1986 on the action on the western end of Longdon noted that "Some of them were very disciplined firing moving back into cover then coming out again and firing again or throwing grenades." Private Carlos Alberto Chiarlini would confirm this as part of his training in an Argentine documentary (Malvinas: La Guerra Que No Vimos, 1984): I was sleeping and then I started hearing shots. I got out of my position, there were tracers everywhere and shot after shot after shot. I looked ahead where the enemy was supposed to be coming from and everything that moved I shot at... I had to keep changing position because they saw me. I would shoot and they would see the flash of my rifle. I couldn't stay there long because they would pinpoint me and I would be in great danger. So I kept changing positions.

During the fighting on Longdon on the night of 11-12 June, the quartermaster officer in the 7th Regiment Command Post, Captain Guillermo Santiago Grau also showed personal courage, volunteering and driving his jeep up the eastern slopes of Mount Longdon and he was responsible in evacuating under British naval bombardment a total of 67 wounded in Captain Carlos López-Astore's B Company 7th Regiment.

During the close-quarter fighting, some British paratroopers reported hearing the Argentine defenders on the main part of Wireless Ridge use the foul 'wise-guy' talk in English adopted from Hollywood movies depicting tough Italian-American gangsters from the 1930s.

On the night of 16 June, a fight broke out involving the 7th Regiment and 3 PARA, which turned into a riot with the Argentinians setting fire to the Globe Store. However a company from 2 PARA soon rushed to the area and order was restored.

British journalist Andrew Vine from the Yorkshire Post aboard the Canberra compared the worn-out state of the young Argentine soldiers captured at Port Stanley with those seized earlier at Goose Green, noting the demeanour of the marine conscripts and those belonging in army units that had received Ranger-type training:

These prisoners were in an even more pitiful state than those taken aboard at San Carlos, gaunt, hollow-cheeked and starving. The cases of trench foot were even worse, the consequences of weeks in the mountains as winter closed in. It was impossible to picture most of them as part of the army that had put up such stiff fight and costly resistance to the Paras, Marines and Scots Guards in those final, brutal days ... Others, though, were more formidable; a hard core of tough, well-trained and professional fighting men who carried themselves with pride, even in defeat. These were the soldiers who had inflicted deaths and injuries on the British.
