= Pedro Conde =

Argentine colonel

Pedro Conde (March 26, 1785 – May 26, 1821) was an Argentine colonel. He fought against the British invasions of the Río de la Plata, and the 1814 siege of Montevideo. He joined the Army of the Andes and fought in the battles of Chacabuco, Cancha Rayada and Maipú.
