= Rosette (decoration) =

Circular device, typically presented with a medal

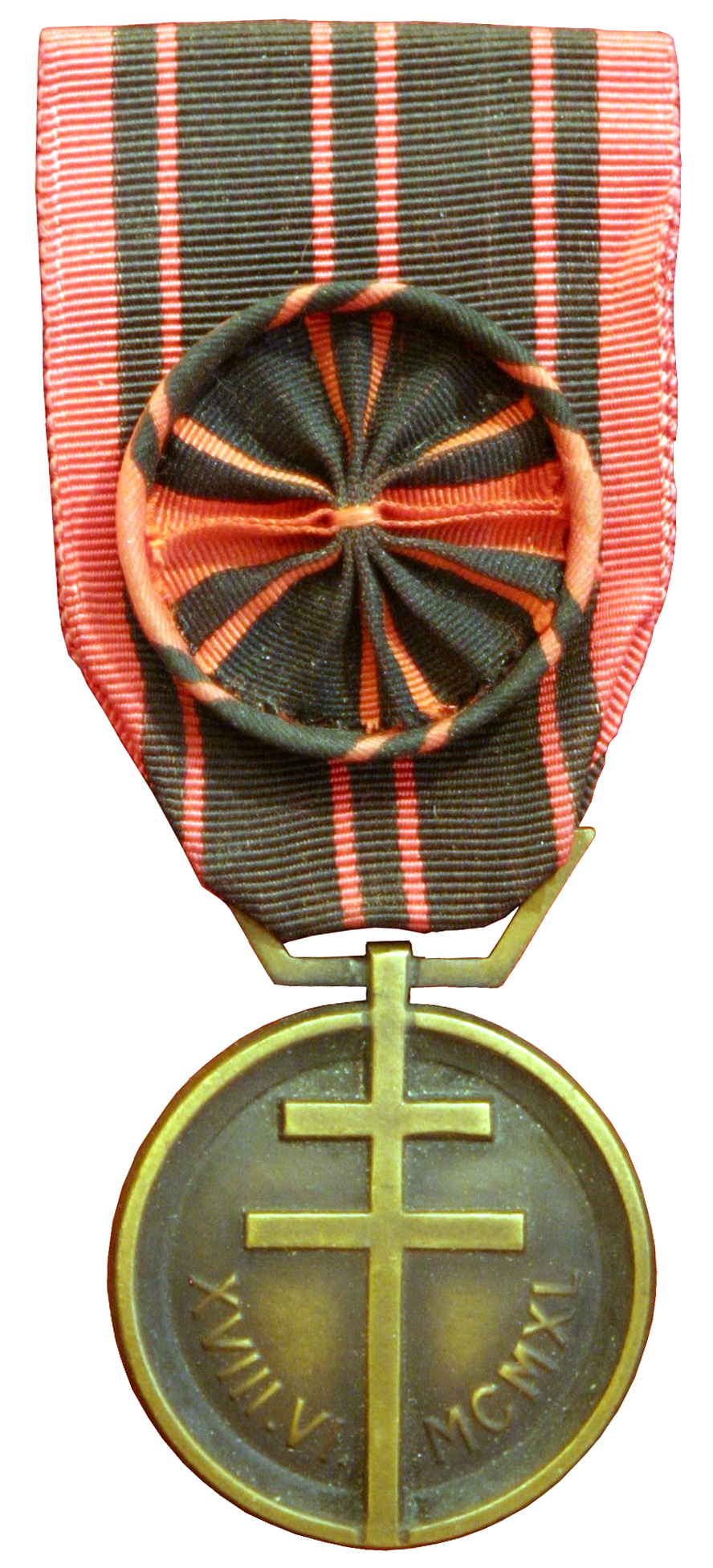
Médaille de la Résistance with a large rosette attached to the medal's suspension ribbon. Smaller rosettes are usually worn separately.

A rosette is a small, circular device that is typically presented with a medal. The rosettes are either worn on the medal to denote a higher rank, or for situations where wearing the medal is deemed inappropriate, such as on a suit. Rosettes are issued to those awarded a knighthood or damehood in a chivalric order, as well as state orders in nations such as Belgium, France, Italy, Japan, and the Netherlands among others. Certain hereditary societies, such as the Society of Descendants of the Latin Kingdom of Jerusalem, as well as some fraternal orders issue rosettes to their members as well.

Rosettes are also sometimes called bowknots, due to their shape. Moreover, a large rosette is sometimes pinned onto the ribbon which suspends a medal, typically the Officer (and sometimes Grand Officer)'s badge of certain orders of chivalry.

Some small lapel rosettes are worn in the same manner as other lapel pins. For instance, knights and dames of the Order of the British Empire now wear a lapel rosette bearing the order's cross in the center, whereas previously this was a purely metallic lapel pin. While a metal lapel pin mounted on a silk rosette is considered a decoration of distinction, this is not always true of a metal emblem lacking the ribbon backing.

== Belgium ==
A rosette adorns the ribbon of all national Orders of Merit (namely the Order of Leopold, the Order of the Crown, the Order of Leopold II, and the dormant Order of the African Star and Royal Order of the Lion) at the rank of Officer. Such rosette may also be worn in diminutive form on appropriate civilian dress. Ranks above that of Officer (Commander, Grand Officer and Grand Cross) may wear a rosette adorned with gold and/or silver bars (or "half-knots") on each side of the rosette on appropriate civilian dress. Such rosette also adorns ribbon bars worn on the semi-formal dress uniform.

== France ==
Légion d'honneur rosette

Several of the top decorations of France, including the Légion d'honneur and the Ordre national du Mérite, are presented with a rosette along with the medal. The Legion of Honor authorized a rosette for those who are the rank of officer or above. If the grade is higher, the rosette is adorned with gold and/or silver bars (or "half-knots") which are place beside each side of the rosette. The same manner is accorded to the Order of National Merit. In occasions when ribbon bars are worn alone, the above-mentioned half-knots and/or rosettes are pinned onto the ribbon bars as appropriate to denote the wearer's grade.

== The Netherlands ==
Pre-1995 Order of Orange-Nassau lapel rosette

As in most countries with multi-level chivalric orders, that follow the example set by the French Légion d'honneur, a rosette is featured on the suspension ribbon of the insignia of the rank of Officer (Knight Third Class). This is the case for the three state awards, the Military William Order, the Order of the Netherlands Lion and the Order of Orange-Nassau, as well as for the dynastic Order of the House of Orange, and the Order of the Golden Ark, a recognised chivalrous order founded by Prince Bernhard of the Netherlands.

All these feature a lapel badge, or buttonhole insignia, for daily use. The badge consists of a small bow in the colours of the decoration ribbon, with a rosette for the rank of Officer (Knight Third Class) and with a rosette adorned with half-knots for the ranks of Knight Grand Cross, Grand Officer, and Commander. The same rosette with or without half-knots is featured on the corresponding medal ribbon. The introduction in 1995 of standardised lapel badges on small bows has made wearing of lapel rosettes in the shape of lapel pins uncommon.

Besides the medal ribbons of the chivalric orders mentioned, the medal ribbon of the Cross of Merit of the Netherlands Red Cross also features a rosette to distinguish it from the Medals of Merit of the Netherlands Red Cross. The rosette is not featured on the Cross of Merit's suspension ribbon.

== United Kingdom ==
Silver rosette

In the United Kingdom, small silver rosettes can be added to the ribbons that are worn in place of medals. Usually these indicate multiple award bars, the number of times a decoration for merit or distinguished service has been awarded. (Exceptions are the George Cross and Victoria Cross, where the ribbons are issued only with miniatures of the medals attached.) Holders of the 1914 Star, the 1939-45 Star, the Atlantic Star, the Pacific Star, the Burma Star, the South Atlantic Medal (awarded for service in the Falklands War), the Gulf War Medal 1991 and the Sierra Leone medal could also receive these rosettes if they met certain criteria for combat service.

== United States ==
Medal Of Honor rosette lapel button

In the United States, the Medal of Honor is issued with a 1/2 in/cm light blue rosette with white stars, authorized for civilian wear as a lapel button. Previously, the Purple Heart was also presented with a purple and white rosette, but now has been replaced by a metallic lapel pin. The lapel pin is designed to be a smaller version of the rectangular service ribbon, also for use on civilian wear. Most American military medals have the ribbon bar design scaled down to the size of a lapel pin. Members of the Sons of the American Revolution wear small, blue-and-buff rosettes as lapel buttons. The colors match those of the uniform of Gen. George Washington and the Continental Army.

=== Lineage societies ===
Several American-based lineage societies provide a rosette as an insignia of membership for informal wear.

== See also ==
- Ribbon (award), for a different variety of rosette
- Service lapel button (disambiguation)
