= South Atlantic Medal =

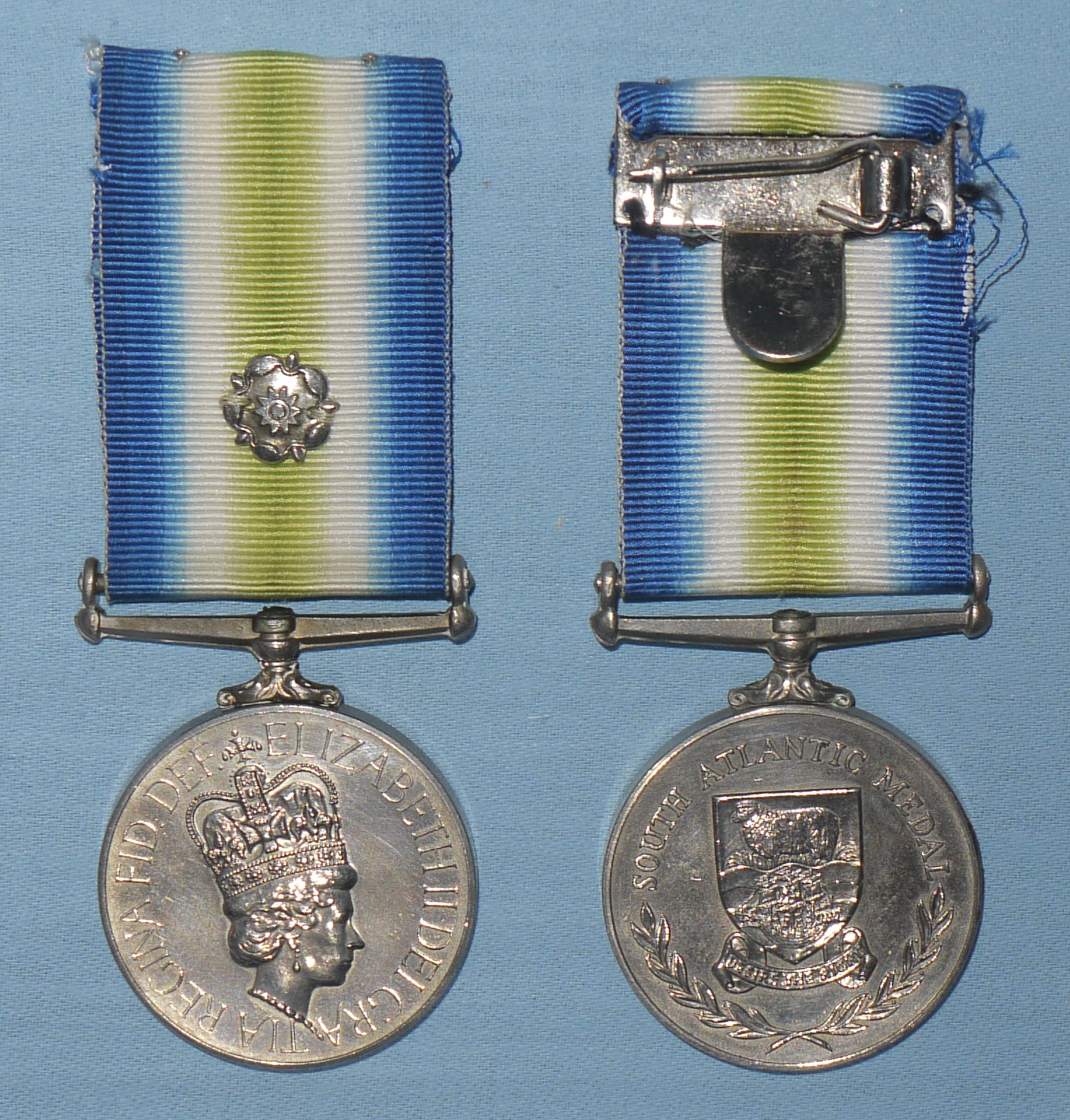
- Obverse, with rosette, and reverse of medal
- Type: Campaign medal
- Awarded for: Service in the South Atlantic, during the Falklands War
- Description: Cupronickel disk, 36mm diameter.
- Presented by: the United Kingdom
- Eligibility: British Armed Forces, Merchant Navy and civilians
- Campaign: Falklands War
- Clasps: No clasp, but a rosette.

Highlights
- Total recipients: Circa 33,300
- ribbon bars of the medal

The South Atlantic Medal is a British campaign medal awarded to British military personnel and civilians for service in the Falklands War of 1982 between the United Kingdom and Argentina. Over 33,000 medals have been awarded. The South Atlantic Medal Association was formed in 1997 for recipients of the South Atlantic Medal.

== Appearance ==
The medal is made of cupronickel, and is 36 mm in diameter. It was struck by the Royal Mint and issued by the Army Medal Office, Droitwich. It has the following design:

The obverse bears a crowned effigy of The Queen facing right, with the inscription ELIZABETH II DEI GRATIA REGINA FID:DEF ("Elizabeth II, by the grace of God, Queen and Defender of the Faith").

The reverse has the Falkland Islands' coat of arms, which bears the words "DESIRE THE RIGHT" (an allusion to English explorer John Davis' ship, "Desire"). A laurel wreath below and the words "SOUTH ATLANTIC MEDAL" above make up the border.

The initials and surname, rank or rating, service number and unit of the recipient are diamond engraved on the edge of the medal, although those for Royal Navy officers, as was the tradition, did not include the service number.

The 32 mm ribbon has a central stripe of "sea green" flanked on each side by stripes of white and "empire blue", shaded and watered, symbolising the Atlantic Ocean. The design, attributed to HM the Queen, was based on the ribbon for the British Second World War campaign medal, the Atlantic Star, itself devised by her father King George VI.

== Criteria ==
The medal with rosette was awarded for one day's service within 35° and 60° South latitude or for at least one operational sortie south of Ascension Island, between 2 April and 14 June 1982 (2 April being the date of the Argentine invasion, 14 June being the date of ceasefire now accepted as the effective Argentine surrender on the islands although the Argentine surrender did not take place until mid August). This, generally, denoted service in the combat zone. Where the rosette was worn on the ribbon, this was both with the medal and on the ribbon bar.

The medal without rosette was awarded for 30 days continuous or accumulated service between 7° and 60° South latitude between 2 April and 14 June 1982 (completing no later than 12 July 1982). As a result of the 2012 Independent Medal Review conducted by Sir John Holmes, from 1 October 2014 the qualifying period for the medal without rosette was extended to 21 October 1982, the date modifications were completed to RAF Stanley airfield allowing operation of RAF Phantoms as personnel on the islands post 14 June remained under threat of potential re invasion and the islands required due attention due to mines, booby traps, burial parties and general post conflict rehabilitation.

The rosette remains an unusual feature for a British medal and was used partly for economy and speed of manufacture, and also as otherwise fewer than two hundred medals would have been issued to the Royal Air Force. While for other arms the vast majority of the medals were issued with a rosette, over 90% of the medals issued to the Royal Air Force are without the rosette, with the recipients mainly stationed on Ascension Island, some 3,300 nmi (6,100 km) north of the Falkland Islands and the war zone. An exception being the Royal Air Force Regiment who had one squadron disembark at San Carlos on 1 June.

Those mentioned in despatches during the campaign wear a bronze oak leaf on the medal ribbon.

Service qualifying for the South Atlantic Medal does not count towards the period required to receive the Accumulated Campaign Service Medal.

== Recipients ==
Initially, about 29,700 people were awarded the medal, including Andrew Mountbatten Windsor. Members of the Merchant Navy and civilians were also eligible, for example civil servants serving in Ascension Island, NAAFI staff, war artist Linda Kitson and journalists attached to the armed forces, including Michael Nicholson.
As at 3 November 2017, as a result of an extension of the qualifying period to 21 October 1982, an additional 3,626 medals have been awarded without rosette.

Branch	Medals issued
British Army	6,968
Royal Air Force	2,008
Royal Navy	12,927
Royal Marines	3,729
Royal Fleet Auxiliary	1,960
Merchant Navy/Civilians	2,090
Further awards from 2014, on extension of qualifying period to 21 Oct 1982	3,626
