= Mount Longdon =

Mountain in East Falkland, Falkland Islands

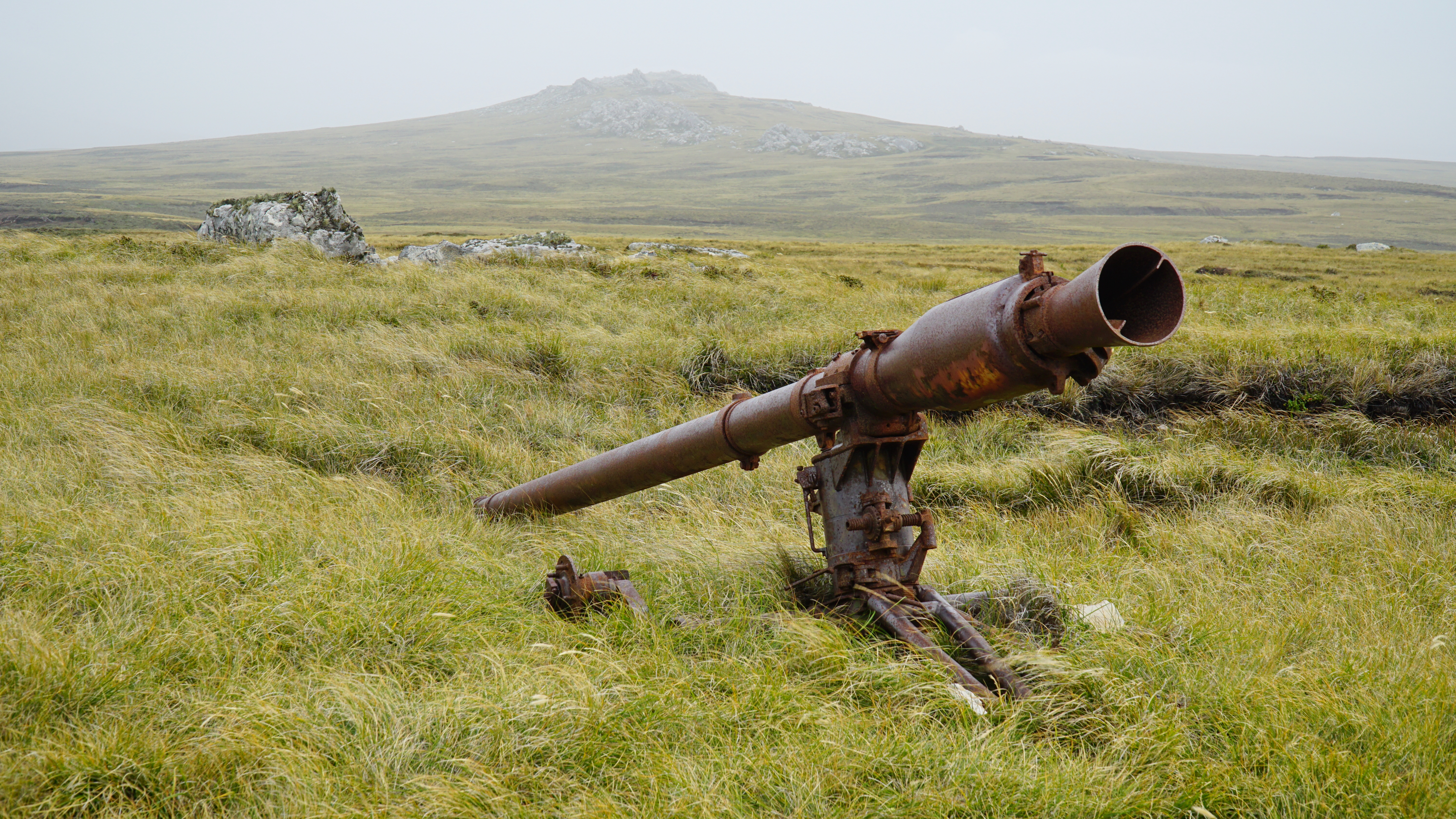

Highest point
- Elevation: 186 m (610 ft)
- Prominence: 97 m (318 ft)
- Isolation: 2 km (1.2 miles)
- Coordinates: 51°40′15″S 57°58′55″W

Geography
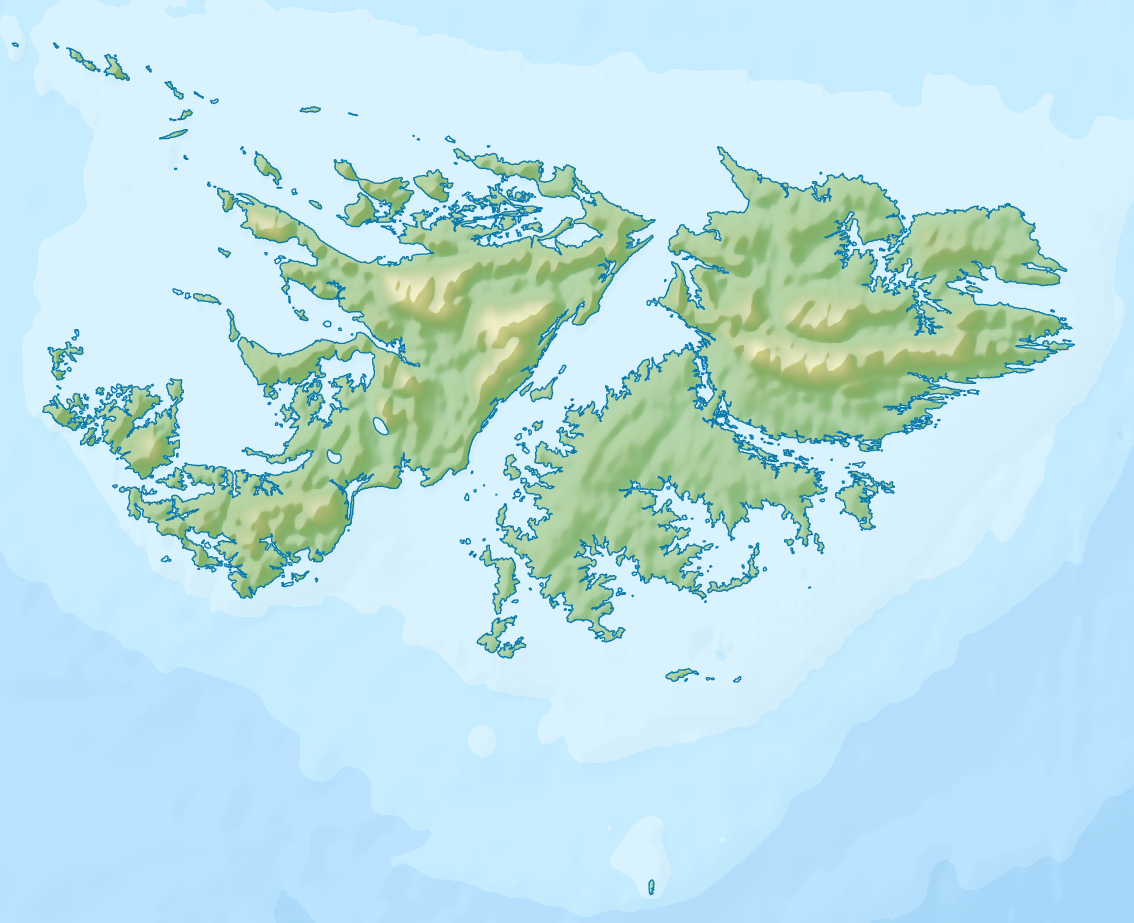
- Location within Falkland Islands
- Location: East Falkland, Falkland Islands, south Atlantic Ocean

Mount Longdon is a hill located in the east of East Falkland island forming part of the Falkland Islands Archipelago. It has an elevation of 186 metres (610 ft) above sea level. It is the highest land in any direction for 2 kilometres (1.2 miles). (Note: This is the distance to the mountain Tumbledown south of Mount Longdon.) It is known as the site of the Battle of Mount Longdon, and overlooks Stanley, the capital of the Falkland Islands.

== Geography ==
Mount Longdon, along with other hills in the local vicinity

Mount Longdon forms part of a hilly area in the East of the East Falkland Island.

=== Geology ===
Mount Longdon and the surrounding area primarily consists of sedimentary rocks with formations of sandstones, quartzites, and shales, which date back to the Paleozoic era.

=== Climate ===

The Climate for Mount Longdon is extremely similar to Stanley and RAF Mount Pleasant due to its proximity. Mount Longdon has a maritime climate in the polar, tundra zones, Köppen classification ET. The climate is very much influenced by the cool South Atlantic ocean and its northerly Patagonian current. The oceanic climatic type is characterised by both low seasonal and diurnal temperature ranges and no marked wet and dry season while in the sub-arctic zone the average monthly maximum temperature exceeds 10 °C (50 °F) for no more than four months of the year and the average monthly minimum does not drop below −3 °C (27 °F). Mount Longdon's elevation, maritime location and topography frequently lead to cool conditions.

Climate data for Stanley, Falkland Islands, 2m asl, 1929–1970
Month	Jan	Feb	Mar	Apr	May	Jun	Jul	Aug	Sep	Oct	Nov	Dec	Year
Record high °C (°F)	24.4 (75.9)	23.3 (73.9)	21.1 (70.0)	17.2 (63.0)	14.1 (57.4)	10.6 (51.1)	10.0 (50.0)	11.1 (52.0)	15.0 (59.0)	17.8 (64.0)	21.7 (71.1)	21.7 (71.1)	24.4 (75.9)
Mean daily maximum °C (°F)	13.3 (55.9)	12.8 (55.0)	11.7 (53.1)	9.4 (48.9)	6.7 (44.1)	5.0 (41.0)	4.4 (39.9)	5.0 (41.0)	7.2 (45.0)	8.9 (48.0)	11.1 (52.0)	12.2 (54.0)	9.0 (48.2)
Daily mean °C (°F)	9.5 (49.1)	8.9 (48.0)	8.1 (46.6)	6.1 (43.0)	3.9 (39.0)	2.2 (36.0)	1.9 (35.4)	2.2 (36.0)	3.9 (39.0)	5.3 (41.5)	7.0 (44.6)	8.1 (46.6)	5.6 (42.1)
Mean daily minimum °C (°F)	5.6 (42.1)	5.0 (41.0)	4.4 (39.9)	2.8 (37.0)	1.1 (34.0)	0.0 (32.0)	−0.6 (30.9)	−0.6 (30.9)	0.6 (33.1)	1.7 (35.1)	2.8 (37.0)	3.9 (39.0)	2.2 (36.0)
Record low °C (°F)	−1.1 (30.0)	−1.1 (30.0)	−2.8 (27.0)	−6.1 (21.0)	−6.7 (19.9)	−11.1 (12.0)	−8.9 (16.0)	−11.1 (12.0)	−10.6 (12.9)	−5.6 (21.9)	−3.3 (26.1)	−1.7 (28.9)	−11.1 (12.0)
Average precipitation mm (inches)	71 (2.8)	58 (2.3)	64 (2.5)	66 (2.6)	66 (2.6)	53 (2.1)	51 (2.0)	51 (2.0)	38 (1.5)	41 (1.6)	51 (2.0)	71 (2.8)	681 (26.8)
Average precipitation days (≥ 0.1 mm)	15	12	10	11	13	11	12	9	9	7	10	14	133
Average relative humidity (%)	78	79	82	86	88	89	89	87	84	80	75	77	83
Mean monthly sunshine hours	198	161	169	115	77	57	69	90	128	189	200	198	1,651
Source 1: Globalbioclimatics/Salvador Rivas-Martínez
Source 2: DMI/Danish Meteorology Institute (sun, humidity, and precipitation days 1931–1960)

Climate data for Mount Pleasant EGYP, East Falkland, 74m asl, 1999–2019
Month	Jan	Feb	Mar	Apr	May	Jun	Jul	Aug	Sep	Oct	Nov	Dec	Year
Record high °C (°F)	26.0 (78.8)	26.8 (80.2)	25.5 (77.9)	26.1 (79.0)	17.8 (64.0)	15.7 (60.3)	12.3 (54.1)	15.11 (59.20)	22.2 (72.0)	17.8 (64.0)	21.7 (71.1)	25.3 (77.5)	26.8 (80.2)
Mean daily maximum °C (°F)	16.8 (62.2)	15.9 (60.6)	14.6 (58.3)	10.9 (51.6)	8.1 (46.6)	5.9 (42.6)	5.4 (41.7)	6.6 (43.9)	8.8 (47.8)	11.7 (53.1)	13.5 (56.3)	15.4 (59.7)	11.1 (52.0)
Mean daily minimum °C (°F)	6.2 (43.2)	6.1 (43.0)	5.1 (41.2)	3.3 (37.9)	1.6 (34.9)	0.4 (32.7)	−0.3 (31.5)	0.3 (32.5)	1.0 (33.8)	2.2 (36.0)	3.4 (38.1)	5.0 (41.0)	2.9 (37.2)
Record low °C (°F)	−0.1 (31.8)	−0.8 (30.6)	−0.6 (30.9)	−2.8 (27.0)	−6.1 (21.0)	−10.1 (13.8)	−10.3 (13.5)	−6.5 (20.3)	−9.8 (14.4)	−3.1 (26.4)	−5.5 (22.1)	−1.5 (29.3)	−10.1 (13.8)
Source: NCDC

== History ==
The Battle of Mount Longdon was fought between the British 3rd Battalion, Parachute Regiment and elements of the Argentine 7th Infantry Regiment on 11–12 June 1982, towards the end of the Falklands War. It was one of three engagements in a Brigade-size operation that night, along with the Battle of Mount Harriet and the Battle of Two Sisters. A mixture of hand-to-hand fighting and ranged combat resulted in the British occupying this key position around the Argentine garrison at Port Stanley. The battle ended in a British victory.

== Summit ==
At the summit of the hill now lies a memorial which today attracts some tourism to the area.

== See also ==
- Battle of Mount Longdon
- List of mountains of the Falkland Islands
