= GADA 601 =

Coordinates: 37°53′30.56″S 57°31′31.91″W

- Active: 1939 – present
- Country: República Argentina
- Branch: Argentine Army
- Type: Anti-aircraft artillery unit
- Role: Anti-aircraft warfare Direct fire Fire support
- Size: Around 1,000+
- Engagements: Falklands War; UNPROFOR; UNFICYP
- Decorations: Falklands Campaign Medal
- Battle honours: Falklands war

Commanders
- Notable commanders: Lieutenant Colonel Héctor Lubin Arias (1982–1984) (Honorary Commander); Lieutenant Colonel Raúl Néstor Berisso (1969–1972) (Honorary Commander)

Insignia
- Identification symbol: A Roland type missile over two vintage cannons set in an "x " arrangement; a map of the Falklands in the background (GAA 601)

The 601st Anti-Aircraft Artillery Group (GAA 601 or Grupo de Artillería Antiaérea 601), historically known as GADA 601 (Grupo de Artillería de Defensa Aérea 601) is the main anti-aircraft artillery unit of the Argentine Army (EA). Its headquarters are just north of Mar del Plata. The unit's name was changed to GAA 601 Teniente General Pablo Ricchieri in 1999. The group played a key role during the 1982 Falklands War. The GAA 601 compound is the main air defence training center in Argentina.

== Origins ==
The origin of the anti-aircraft artillery of the Argentine Army dates back to 1939, when the Grupo de Artillería Antiaérea was established in Campo de Mayo, the main headquarters of the army, along with the Centro de Instrucción Antiaéreo, a training unit.

Meanwhile, the authorities of the resort town of Mar del Plata were seeking the settling of an army base there. In 1940, a local independent commission, under the auspices of Juan Fava and Rufino Inda, both of them former socialist Mayors of the city, made a formal request to the Ministry of War. Incidentally, the socialists ruled Mar del Plata during the two major combat deployments in the unit's history (1962 and 1982), although the country was under a military dictatorship in both occasions. By the end of 1944, the two anti-aircraft groups were merged and effectively transferred to Mar del Plata, under the name of Escuela Antiaérea ("Antiaircraft Artillery School").

=== Weapons ===
The first AAA weapons deployed were 76.2 mm Skoda guns and 20 mm cannons.

Several years later, between 1949 and 1962, the army purchased Bofors 40 mm guns and 90 mm guns. During 1951, the first long-range radar, a Westinghouse, was imported from the USA. The group changed its name from Training Center of Air Defense (CIADA) to Artillery Group of Air Defense 601 (GADA 601) in 1964. Its first commander was Lieutenant Colonel Esteban Rodriguez. The GADA was composed of batteries, each one divided into three sections. The section, led by a 2nd Lieutenant, usually comprised two artillery pieces. In 1968, a new sub-unit, Battery "C", was established, incorporating new material like the 40 mm L 70 Bofors-Contraves radar-guided system.

The first missile Battery was equipped with Tigercat triple launchers in 1970.

In 1980, after a border crisis with Chile, the army acquired the 35 mm Oerlikon-Contraves radar-guided system. Furthermore, a new unit had been added to the GADA in 1976, the AADA 602, to deal first with the Tigercats and some years later with Roland-2 missiles.

After losing half of the 35 mm systems and one of the four Rolands in the war of 1982, the group was reinforced with 40 mm Bofors and 30 mm Hispano-Suiza guns.

== Operational history ==
=== Political unrest (1955–1978) ===
From the second term in office of Juan Perón to the dictatorships of the 1970s, there were several periods of political unrest and violence involving the military. Argentina witnessed the overthrowing of constitutional governments followed by sporadic clashes between rival factions of the armed forces and the surge of leftist militant organizations. The GADA took part in a number of these incidents:

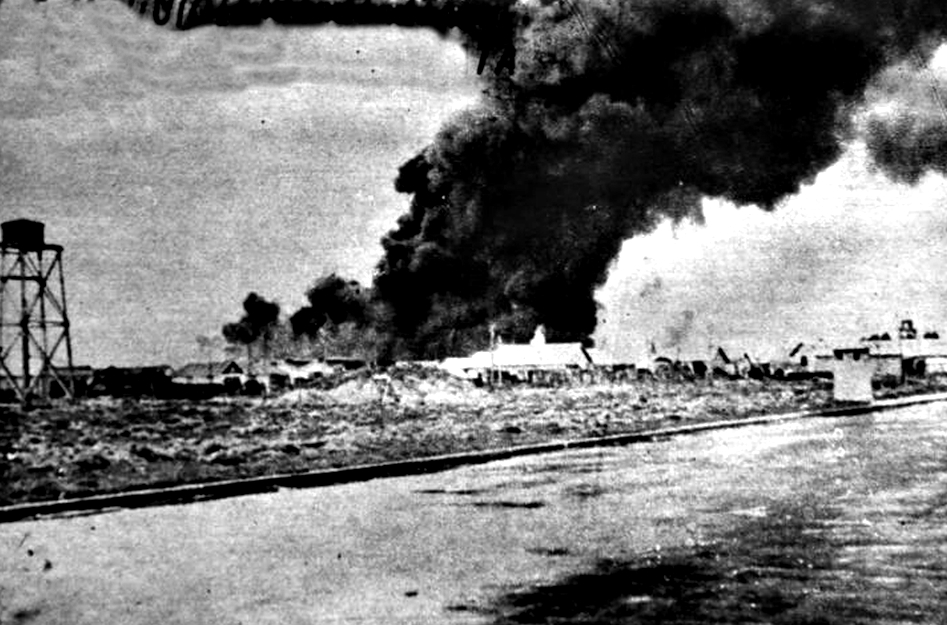
Barracks of the Antiaircraft Artillery School under fire, 19 September 1955

1955: Revolución Libertadora. During the last days of Peronism in power, following a huge purge on its ranks, the Army became the only force inside the military with a majority of officers supporting Perón. This was also the case of the GADA. There was a first ill-fated attempt against the government, led mainly by the Navy, on 16 June, when rebel aircraft launched a series of air strikes around Plaza de Mayo, killing nearly 350 people. In Mar del Plata, the group kept a close watch on the naval base, taking positions on the hills surrounding the port. Eventually, the uprising succeeded on 16 September. This time, the attitude of the GADA officers was hesitant. During the morning of the 19, the cruiser ARA Nueve de Julio (the former USS Boise) and five destroyers shelled the group's barracks, already abandoned by the troops. A long-range radar tower and other equipment was destroyed. The commander changed sides shortly after this action.

1962: After the fall of President Arturo Frondizi and his replacement by a puppet civilian government under the supervision of the armed forces, the military remained divided over the issue of the banning of some political parties. While there was a wide consensus on the proscription of leftist ideologists, things became not so clear regarding Peronism. The hard-line group was dubbed colorados ("the purples"), and the "legalist" - against an indiscriminate ban - azules ("the blues").

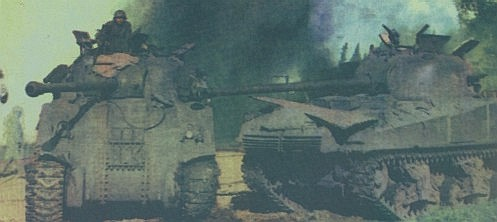
Sherman tank disabled by 40 mm fire near Florencio Varela, September 1962

In September 1962, the army's commander in chief and the Ministry of Defence were controlled by the colorados. An internal uprising started inside the army on September 18, when the azules, led by General Onganía defied the central authority. President José María Guido remained neutral. On 20 September, the units involved marched to the capital. One of these was a 30 Sherman tanks strong column departed from their base at Magdalena, south east of La Plata. The Commander-in-Chief set up a roadblock near Florencio Varela, a city in the midway between Buenos Aires and La Plata. A GADA's detachment, under the command of Major Merbilháa, was called to duty to reinforce the position with their Bofors 40 mm guns. The half-hearted engagement began at mid-morning when a reconnaissance plane was scared off by anti-aircraft fire. The post was eventually overpassed by the armoured column, but according to Colonel Federico de la Fuente, the group commander, the 40 mm guns disabled between 4 and 5 Shermans. Historian Félix Luna, instead, suggests the loss of only two tanks. During a previous action, a patrol of scouts had been captured by members of the GADA. After a full day of clashes, the crisis ended with the dismissal Commander in Chief and the Minister of Defence when the armoured forces reached Buenos Aires. Onganía claimed victory for the azules and their "constitutional" point of view. However, he would take the presidential seat from president Arturo Illia by a coup d'état in 1966.

1970–1978: The Dirty War. Amid leftist violence and social unrest, the military engaged in indiscriminate repression along this period. The first significant GADA activity was the deployment, in 1975, of a full battery of light anti-aircraft guns in Tucumán province, which by the time was the scenario of a rough counterinsurgency campaign against the ERP. The guns were intended to deal with the alleged presence of a helicopter Hiller 1100 stolen by the guerrillas from a Government-owned company. The conflict struck home on 11 February 1976, when a splinter organisation of the ERP ambushed and killed GADA's commander, Lieutenant-Colonel Rafael Raúl Reyes, in Mar del Plata's downtown. A few weeks later, the military overthrew the government of Isabel Perón. The coup gave them the full control of the country and established a military dictatorship. The group, along with special intelligence officers, mounted operations not only against militants, but also against those ideologically affiliated to them. These illegal arrests were carried out with the collaboration of the Air Force, which built a clandestine detention facility near the city's airport, dubbed La Cueva (The Cave). Most of these detainees became missing or desaparecidos. One of the intelligence officers involving in these activities, Captain Fernando Cativa Tolosa, was killed in a shoot-out with militants on 8 October 1976. In 2008, former GADA commander Colonel Pedro Barda was indicted over human right abuses and eventually sentenced to life in prison. Barda died in Buenos Aires in August 2011. A psychologist, Marta García de Candeloro, later testified against Barda and described how she and her husband, attorney Jorge Candeloro, were arrested at their house in the province of Neuquén and transferred to the anti-aircraft unit where her husband along with five other attorneys from Mar del Plata were detained and last seen alive on 6 July 1977, in what later became known as "The Night of the Neckties" (La noche de las corbatas)".

=== Crisis with Chile (1978) ===
A dispute over the islands of the Beagle Channel prompted a conflict with Chile in 1978. On 12 December, the bulk of the GADA was deployed in northern Patagonia. The Grupo de Artillería de Defensa Aérea Mixto 602, in charge of the Tigercat missiles were moved by railway to the town of Río Colorado, close to the river of the same name, in Río Negro province. Meanwhile, the remainder of the force continued the trip further west, to the city of Zapala, in Neuquen province. The troops then marched to the buildup area near Plaza Huincul. The group established three outposts along the rivers Colorado and Limay in order to provide AAA defence to key bridges. After a diplomatic breakthrough achieved by the Vatican envoy, Cardinal Antonio Samoré, the GADA came back to Mar del Plata on 30 January 1979.

=== Falklands War (1982) ===
Just before the start of the crisis that would lead to the Falklands War, the army group was reinforced when an Argentine Air Force detachment, the Grupo 1 de Artillería Antiaérea (1st Group of Antiaircraft Artillery) was transferred from Tandil to Mar del Plata in October 1981. The Air Force group was reinforced with personnel from Río Gallegos. Both forces would operate together during the conflict in the defence of Stanley airport, renamed BAM Malvinas by the Argentine Air Force and Goose Green airstrip, designated BAM Cóndor (Cóndor Military Air Base).

GADA 601 was mobilised to Comodoro Rivadavia, along the Patagonian coast, on 12 April. The equipment was loaded at the naval base of Mar del Plata on board the cargo ship Córdoba, bound for Puerto Deseado. As the ship was damaged whilst at anchor, the artillery, missiles systems and vehicles were airlifted to Comodoro Rivadavia. A battery comprising a Roland-2 missile unit, a Skyguard radar and two 35 mm Oerlikon twin cannons was left behind to provide air defence for the mainland air bases of Puerto San Julián and Río Gallegos. The remainder of the troops and their materiel finally crossed to the Islands by air between 12 April and 24 April.

The troops were deployed in three batteries (A, B and C), with three sections each, plus AADA 602 with a Roland-2 launcher. Each section manned two twin Oerlikon-Contraves guns controlled by a Skyguard radar. A second anti-aircraft group of the army, the GADA 101 from Ciudadela, Buenos Aires, arrived in Stanley on 29 April. They were armed with eight single HS-831 30 mm cannons. The main early warning system for the army was an AN/TPS-44 tactical surveillance radar (Alert Mk II A/O), manned by GADA 601 personnel, mounted on the eastern slopes of Sapper Hill. The main areas to defend were the airfields (Stanley and Goose Green), Command and Control centres and artillery positions. The Air Force Grupo 1 de Artillería Antiaérea was in charge of the airport, with nine twin 20 mm cannons and a Super-Fledermaus Fire Control radar with three Oerlikon 35 mm twin guns, similar to the Skyguard Fire Control radar. GADA 601 deployed one of its own 35 mm section near the east end of the airstrip. The other sections and the Roland unit were initially located in an arc from Moody Brook to the eastern slopes of Sapper Hill. The third section of B battery was transported by helicopter to Goose Green on 29 April.

==== 1st May: Opening actions ====
The GADA radar on Sapper Hill was the first to detect the Black Buck raid of 1 May. Unsure of its position after such a long flight at low level over water, the commander (Flt Lt Martin Withers) of Vulcan bomber XM607 briefly climbed to gain a radar fix from the mountains east of Stanley. In performing this manoeuvre, his aircraft was briefly detected by the crew of the AN/TPS-44 surveillance radar before descending back to low-level. Initially, the crew of the radar were uncertain if the aircraft they had detected was hostile, leading to delays in alerting the air defence system. The airbase was warned at 4:20 am local time but the low-level approach of the Vulcan bomber combined with active jamming from DASH 10 ECM pod prevented the AAA defences from engaging. The stick of 21 1000 lb bombs damaged the airport tower, scored a single direct hit in the centre of the runway and killed two Air Force personnel. Nevertheless, the airstrip was still operational.

At 7:40 four Sea Harriers from HMS Hermes carried out a second attack from the west. Argentine sources claimed that a Roland-2 downed one of these aircraft, however, British sources indicate that none of the aircraft were hit. Another five Sea Harriers came in from the east received heavy 35 and 20 mm AAA, both from GADA and the Air Force's Grupo 1. The Harriers dropped a combination of 1000 lb bombs and cluster bombs setting fire to a fuel depot and causing minor damage to the airport facilities. GADA claimed to have shot down two aircraft that morning, one to 35 mm fire, the other to a Tigercat missile. British sources, whilst conceding that ground fire was intense, said there was only a 20 mm hit on the tail of the Sea Harrier piloted by Lt. Cdr. David Morgan and no British aircraft were lost.

===== Friendly fire incident =====
Later that day, a Mirage III attempting an emergency landing due to fuel shortages after combat with a Sea Harrier, was shot down in a friendly fire incident while approaching the airbase. A GADA 601 battery fired three bursts of 35 mm rounds at the aircraft, which had already been targeted by Argentine Navy 30 mm guns deployed along the town. The official history of the Argentine Air Force attributed the incident to a lack of coordination between the Joint Antiaircraft Command and ground troops, who had also fired small arms and machine guns at the Mirage, triggering a chain reaction from Navy and Army gunners. The pilot, Capt García Cuerva, was killed.

==== Goose Green ====
In contrast to the vigorous anti-aircraft response in Stanley, the GADA 601/Grupo 1 team at Goose Green was taken by surprise. The ground crews there were assisting a number of Pucará aircraft that were about to take off to avoid being caught on the airstrip. At 8:00, the air warning was downgraded to "blue" to allow the Pucará's departure. The anti-aircraft guns were ordered to perform a training exercise. To make matters worse, the gear of one of the planes became embedded in mud, delaying the operation. A few minutes later, three Sea Harriers commenced their attack. The leader of the formation dropped two 1,000 lb bombs, which missed their intended targets (the airstrip and an ammunition depot). The other two aircraft dropped cluster bombs and several bomblets hit one the still grounded Pucará, killing the pilot, Lt Jukic and the Argentine aircraft burst in flames. Another bomb dispensed its load of bomblets over the tents of the support personnel; seven men were killed and 13 wounded. The other bombs started a fire very close to a stockpile of ammunition boxes but fire crews prevented further explosions.

===== Sea Harrier incident =====
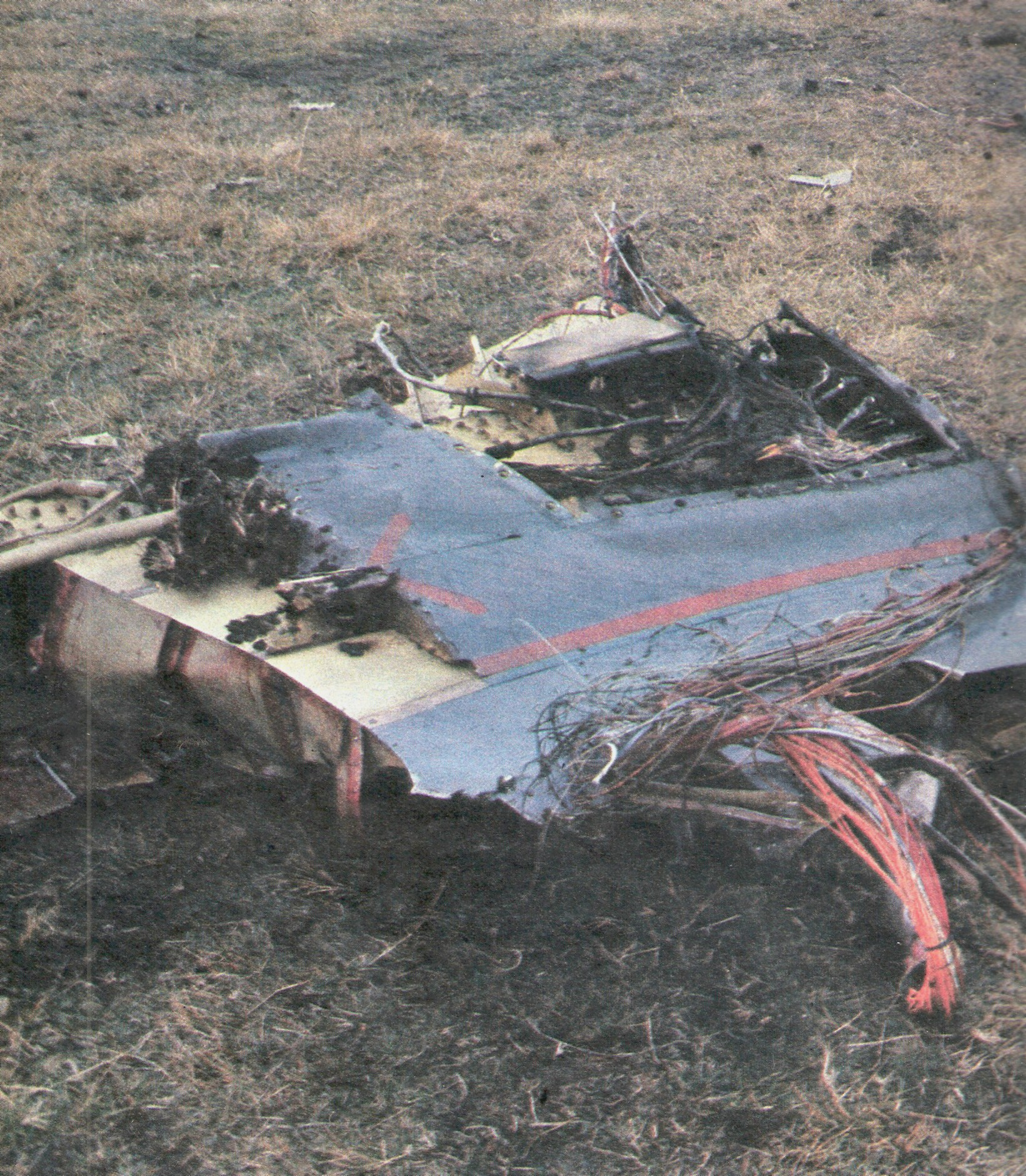
Piece of wreckage from Sea Harrier nº. XZ450

After a few days without airstrikes, on May 4 a flight of three Sea Harriers from 800 Naval Air Squadron armed with cluster bombs raided Goose Green. However, this time potential targets were well camouflaged, and the airbase had been put under a 24-hour full alert. The 35 mm cannons were relocated to the north and south of the small Goose Green peninsular from their original position west of the airstrip. The raid's leading aircraft, piloted by Lt Cdr Gordie Batt, was locked up by the Skyguard system while flying from the east at very low altitude. Batt became aware of this from his onboard systems and deployed Chaff whilst breaking right so the Skyguard lost lock. However, behind the lead was Sea Harrier XZ450 piloted by Lt Nick Taylor. This aircraft lacked a Radar Warning Receiver (RWR) as it had been removed before the war to fit instrumentation for the new Sea Eagle missile, that was undergoing trials. Unaware of the threat ahead, Taylor was hit by a second salvo from the 35 mm cannons in the fuselage and caught fire, losing the left-wing and crashed at a 10° angle. Taylor's body was thrown through the canopy and fell 80 meters away from the crash site. The crash was caught on the gun camera film, of Flt Lt Ted Ball, which showed a large explosion in the region of the fuselage that was clearly unsurvivable. The third aircraft, piloted by Flt Lt Ted Ball, released its bombs but no targets were hit and returned to Hermes.

The remains of Lt Nick Taylor were buried on the edge of the airfield where he fell, with full military honours, and his grave is still tended by the residents of Goose Green. Taylor's aircraft, XZ450, was also the aircraft that made the Sea Harrier's maiden flight on 20 August 1978.

Examination of the wreckage of XZ450 yielded the panel for the launch of Sea Eagle missiles, British sources have speculated that the Argentines concluded that Sea Eagle had been made operational and this was another factor that kept the Argentine navy in port.

The shot down prompted a change of tactics in the employment of the Sea Harriers, in order to avoid further losses of such a valuable air defence assets and pilots, the subsequent air-to-ground operations were carried out from high altitude, well above the reach of the enemy ground fire. It was not until the arrival of the first GR3 Harriers that limited low-level missions were launched, most of them in close air support role, or against high-value targets, such artillery or radar. The GR.3 Harrier, however, repeated the experience of its naval counterpart. A series of losses and aircraft damaged left just three GR3 Harrier operational of 1(F) Squadron by June 1 (although reinforcements joined the Task Force later that day by flying directly from Ascension Island). To fix the problem, the RAF increased the number of Chaff and flares packages onboard and enhancing its radar-detection capabilities. The GR3 were also supported by Sea Harrier's diversionary missions.

===== Second friendly fire incident =====
On May 12, another friendly-fire incident struck the GADA after three A4 Skyhawks conducted a successful attack on HMS Glasgow. One of the returning jets flew by mistake over a banned zone in Goose Green and was shot down with the loss of the pilot, Lt Gavazzi. The Argentine Air Force conceded that this time the incident was triggered by the pilot's navigation error.

===== GR3 Harriers in action =====
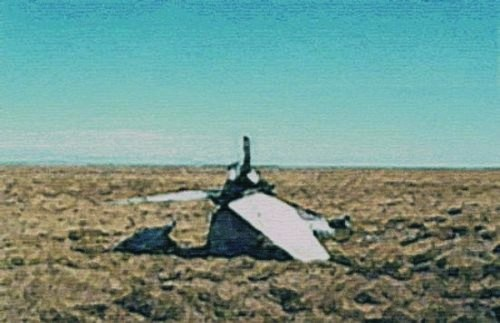
Remains of the tail of Bob Iveson's Harrier XZ998, northwestern Lafonia

With the beginning of Operation Sutton, the Harrier GR3s of 1(F) Squadron stepped up attacks upon ground targets. These included low-level strikes with cluster bombs and rockets as well as nuisance raids in which 1000-lb bombs were launched in loft and high-altitude profiles. During some high-altitude bombings the radar-guided guns locked onto the falling 1,000-lb bombs and, it is claimed, destroyed them on at least three occasions (although the British used air burst 1000 lb bomb in the conflict). It is also claimed that a Roland-2 blew up another bomb in mid-air after the release aircraft successfully broke radar lock.

On May 22, the section deployed in Goose Green engaged a strike package of four Harrier GR3s from 1(F) Squadron. One of the Harriers, piloted by Sqn Ldr Jerry Pook, released chaff approximately 2 km from the target zone, blinding the radar and triggering an anti-missile alarm (confirmed by the reports of the GADA's antiaircraft battery under Second Lt. Claudio Oscar Braghini). Nevertheless, Braghini reports that they re-locked Pook's Harrier and fired several 35-mm rounds. British after-action reports indicate that the Argentine forces engaged all of the Harriers with heavy AAA fire but that it was the Harrier GR3 piloted by Sqn Ldr PV Harris that was subsequently locked up by a Super Fledermaus-type radar. Harris pressed his attack but his cluster bombs hung up. Argentine forces report that the air attack produced no damage but the after-action report by the British indicates secondary explosions following the attack with cluster bombs.

On the night of May 24, the GADA 601 section issued a warning to the airbase at Goose Green about the presence of a helicopter and the possible landing of special forces. Several minutes later, members of the SAS mounted a diversionary attack on Darwin Hill.

On May 27, during the first stages of the battle of Goose Green, several Harrier sorties hit the Argentine advanced positions to the north in support of the assault, but the Close Air Support mission was complicated by bad weather and poor communications. After making four passes, Sqn Ldr Bob Iveson's aircraft was hit by heavy AAA fire from GADA 601 35-mm cannon, according to the British version. Most Argentine sources claim that the Harrier was hit by Air Force's 20-mm Rh-202 cannon fire. The aircraft, Harrier XZ998, exploded in the air about 5,000 meters from GADA 601's position. Sqn Ldr Iveson bailed out safely and was rescued by friendly forces three days later. Many of the aircraft shot down or damaged by ground defences were hit after making repeated passes over the target, and the wisdom of these tactics was repeatedly questioned.

===== Direct fire on Darwin Hill =====
The Darwin school-house in flames after being hit by 35 mm rounds

The next morning, on May 28, British troops from the 2nd PARA Regiment took Darwin Hill after fierce fighting and the GADA detachment, observed several platoons advancing down the southern slopes of the ridge. After identifying them as British, GADA 601 section engaged with direct fire. The 35 mm bursts blocked the advance of the leading companies, killing one man Private Mark Holman-Smith who was trying to recover a machine gun and wounding eleven including their commander, Major Hugh Jenner and his signaller. This fire forced the rear platoon, attached from A Company, to remain behind Darwin Hill for the remainder of the battle.

The last direct-fire mission of GADA 601's section targeted the Darwin school-house, a position recently taken by troops of D Company. The building, already set on fire by British white phosphorus grenades, was destroyed by 35 mm rounds. Private Steve Dixon, from D Company, was killed when he was hit by a splinter from a 35 mm shell. The British advance from this area was halted on the orders of Major Chris Keeble who decided to stop the advance and consolidate his position.

Shortly after, the GADA position was subjected to mortar fire and the power generator for the guns was damaged beyond repair. A later Harrier GR.3 strike failed to hit the GADA 601 position.

With the garrison now isolated and surrounded, the Argentine commanding officer surrendered the following day.

==== The battle for the capital ====
After the fall of Goose Green, British effort concentrated on the final assault on Port Stanley (called Puerto Argentino by the Argentines).

Between May 2 and May 28, three Vulcan sorties were planned, but only one was carried out against Base Aérea Militar Malvinas. Argentine sources reveal that two soldiers were slightly injured but no damage was done to the airstrip. Another attempt against the airstrip was carried out during May 24 when a flight of four GR3s, flying at low level, dropped retarded bombs on the runway, supported by two Sea Harriers tossing air burst bombs from altitude to deceive the air defences. The retarded bombs produced only surface damage, which was repaired six hours after the strike. Argentine sources acknowledge that a Pucará and an Aermacchi were damaged. One of the GR3s was also hit either by debris, according to the British version, or by antiaircraft fire, according to Argentine sources.

On May 25, the group suffered its first fatality when a soldier was killed by the blast of an unexploded cluster bomblet.

On May 30 a pair of GR3 was initially tasked to attack, with SNEB rockets, entrenched troops on Mount Wall, west of Stanley, one of the first strikes against the defensive ring around the Falklands capital. The air patrol was led by Sqn. Ld. Jerry Pook in XZ963. The original target was changed for a helicopter landing zone, some distance eastward. After approaching from the south, Pook flew over a column of vehicles and troops and was greeted by automatic fire around 4 km from the target's area. Argentine authors assert instead that the aircraft was hit by 35 mm fire from GADA's 1st section, B battery, which was completing a redeployment from Moody Brook to a position between Sapper Hill and the Stanley racecourse, under the command of 2nd Lieutenant Roberto Enrique Ferre. Pook's first-hand account recalls to have felt a "heavy thump", which is compatible with the impact of a large anti-aircraft shell. Nevertheless, the actual target's position given by Pook in his book was too far to the west to being acquired and shot at by GADA's gunners, albeit he is not too much assertive about having been hit by small arms rounds. A British official report states, however, that on June 12 another GR3 was peppered by "AAA splinters" east of Mount Harriet, almost the same location where Pook's jet was damaged. After finding no targets in the assigned area, both Harriers attacked the original objective further west. At this time it became clear that Pook's jet was leaking fuel as a consequence of the hit. With the engine in the verge of burning out and an incipient hydraulic failure, Pook climbed to 7,000 meters and ejected some 45 NM from Hermes. He was rescued only 10 minutes later.

Harrier XZ997 on HMS Hermes deck, showing shrapnel damage on its left wing, 14 June 1982

On May 31, Stanley airport was hit by the combined action of Vulcan and Harrier aircraft. The Vulcan fired Shrike anti-radar missiles, which went stray when the Argentine radar-operators switched off their devices. The Sea Harriers dropped bombs from high level, and three Harriers strafed the airstrip with cannon fire and rockets, in the belief that A4 Skyhawks had recently landed there. A Skyguard section claimed to have hit two GR3s just before the aircraft opened fire and the RAF acknowledged that the two aircraft were hit, but the source of the damage is unclear. The engine of the leading Harrier, XV789 was replaced onboard Hermes, and remained grounded for five days. The other fighter, XZ977, needed minor repairs.

On June 1, the Roland-2 system shot down a Sea Harrier over the airport. The aircraft, XZ456, belonging to the 801 Naval Air Squadron from HMS Invincible, was in a recce mission 7 km south of Stanley, apparently out of the reach of the missile, but tracked by its radar. The Argentine officer in charge of the unit, Lt. Carlos Leónidas Regalini, fired the Roland despite the target being 7,000 meters away. The pilot, Flt. Lt. Ian Mortimer, climbed, confident that he had outmanoeuvred the missile. A couple of seconds later, the rear bay of his jet was torn apart by the explosion of the proximity fuze, leaving only the cockpit. Mortimer's ejection was witnessed by hundreds of Argentine troops. After a 9-hour ordeal at sea, he was recovered by a British helicopter.

On June 3 GADA lost four men to a missile strike. While at least two Skyguard units were fighting off an air attack – believed at that time to be conducted by Harriers - two missiles were fired by one Vulcan bomber involved in the operation Black Buck six. The long-range radars switched off their emissions as usual, but the two Skyguard systems waited until it was too late for one of them. Second Lt. Fernando Ignacio Huergo's section claims that they locked on to a "bomb" and destroyed it in mid-air – it maybe hit one of the missiles - but at the same time of this explosion, another blast was heard. The other missile, mounted on the radar wave of the 1st section of battery A's Skyguard had hit its target. First Lt. Alejandro Dachary, and three of his men were killed. Another soldier survived the attack. Apparently, the operator, warned by the alarm, turned off the radar, but the missile was already in terminal phase and struck home anyway. The bomber, Vulcan XM597, was forced to divert to Rio de Janeiro in Brazil during the returning trip after its in-flight refuelling probe broke. One of the missiles it was carrying was ditched into the ocean to reduce drag, but the other remained stuck on the pylon and could not be released. Sensitive documents containing classified information were jettisoned into the sea via the crew hatch, and a "Mayday" signal was sent. The aircraft was eventually cleared to land by Brazilian authorities. The Vulcan remained interned for nine days and returned along with its crew on 11 June. However, the remaining Shrike missile was confiscated.

On 9 June, Harrier XZ997 was hit by splinters over Sapper Hill, defended by at least one 35 mm and a Tigercat section . The aircraft wings and upper fuselage were holed in several places, and the Harrier suffered a minor hydraulic failure on recovery.

During a naval bombardment against Sapper Hill, on the early morning of June 12, the GADA's main radar was damaged and a soldier killed.

Harrier XW919 on board Contender Bezant on its way back to Britain after being declared out of service

In what was the last GADA 601 success in this war, Harrier XW919 was hit by shrapnel, possibly from a Tigercat missile, and seriously damaged on June 12, while dropping CBUs on an artillery position near Sapper Hill. During the recovery, the aircraft caught fire on Hermes flight deck, owing to a fractured reaction pipe. Argentine sources claim that the aircraft was hit by AAA immediately after the attack. A 155 mm howitzer was lightly damaged and six soldiers injured. The Harrier had extensive repairs and, though still operational, it was ultimately transferred to the SFDO (School of Flight Deck Operations) at Culdrose. This Harrier was eventually donated to the Polish Aviation Museum of Kraków.

In the final hours of the war, the westernmost section of the group took part of the battle of Wireless Ridge, supporting the withdrawal of the Infantry Regiment 7 with 35 mm fire.

After the Argentine surrender, the group's 35 mm Oerlikon guns, abandoned and disabled by their operators, were captured by British forces. A total of twelve GDF-002 Argentine Army and three GDF-001 Argentine Air Force guns were captured and later shipped back to Britain in "Operation Skyguard", five Surviving Skyguard FC radars and the Argentine Air Force's Super Fledermaus FC radar were also shipped back to Britain. The Roland 2 fire unit was also sent back to Britain as a valuable prize. The GDF-002 guns were later refurbished by BMARC and used to form a Royal Auxiliary Air Force squadron at RAF Waddington. Four Skyguard radar units are employed by RAF Police to survey UK military flights over residential areas and to give warning of low-flying aircraft on sensitive facilities since 1993.

The bulk of the group's personnel left the Islands on 17 June 1982. The officers were released a month later.

==== Aircraft shot down or disabled by GADA 601 ====
Nº	Pilot	Date	Place	Weapon	Effect
Sea Harrier XZ450	Lt. Nick Taylor RN †	4 May 1982	Goose Green	35 mm fire	Shot Down
Harrier XZ988	Sqn. Ldr. Bob Iveson	27 May 1982	Goose Green	35 mm fire	Shot Down
Harrier XZ963	Sqn. Ldr. Jerry Pook	30 May 1982	West of Stanley	35 mm/Small arms fire	Out of service
Sea Harrier XZ456	Flt. Lt. Ian Mortimer	1 June 1982	South of Stanley airport	Roland-2 missile	Shot Down
Harrier XW919	Flt. Lt. Murdo McLeod	12 June 1982	Sapper Hill	35 mm splinters	Out of service

==== Direct fire support ====
Date	Place	Target	Effect
28 May 1982	Goose Green	2nd PARA Regiment	2 soldiers killed, 11 wounded Two advancing companies halted 20% of casualties among PARA C Company; Company's HQs out of action
13/14 June 1982	Wireless Ridge	2nd PARA Regiment	Withdrawal of remnants of Infantry Regiment 7 successfully covered by 35 mm fire

== Peacekeeping missions ==
GADA 601 have taken part in several UN peacekeeping missions since 1992 with a contingent of 200 troops. The main peacekeeping operation involving the GADA was UNPROFOR. The GADA was under the command of the Batallón Ejército Argentino (BAE), deployed in Western Slavonia from February 1992 to November 1995. About 70 officers and NCOs of the force also joined the Fuerza de Tareas Argentina (FTA) in Cyprus.

== 1999 Merge ==
As part of an Army reform, the GADA 101 was moved from Ciudadela to Mar del Plata and merged into the GADA 601 in 1999. The joint force was renamed Grupo de Artillería Antiaérea 601 Teniente General Pablo Ricchieri. The commander of the group during the Falklands conflict, Héctor Lubin Arias, was appointed honorary commander on 20 November 2010.
