= FV Narwal =

Argentine fishing trawler

Coordinates: 52°45′16″S 58°02′20″W

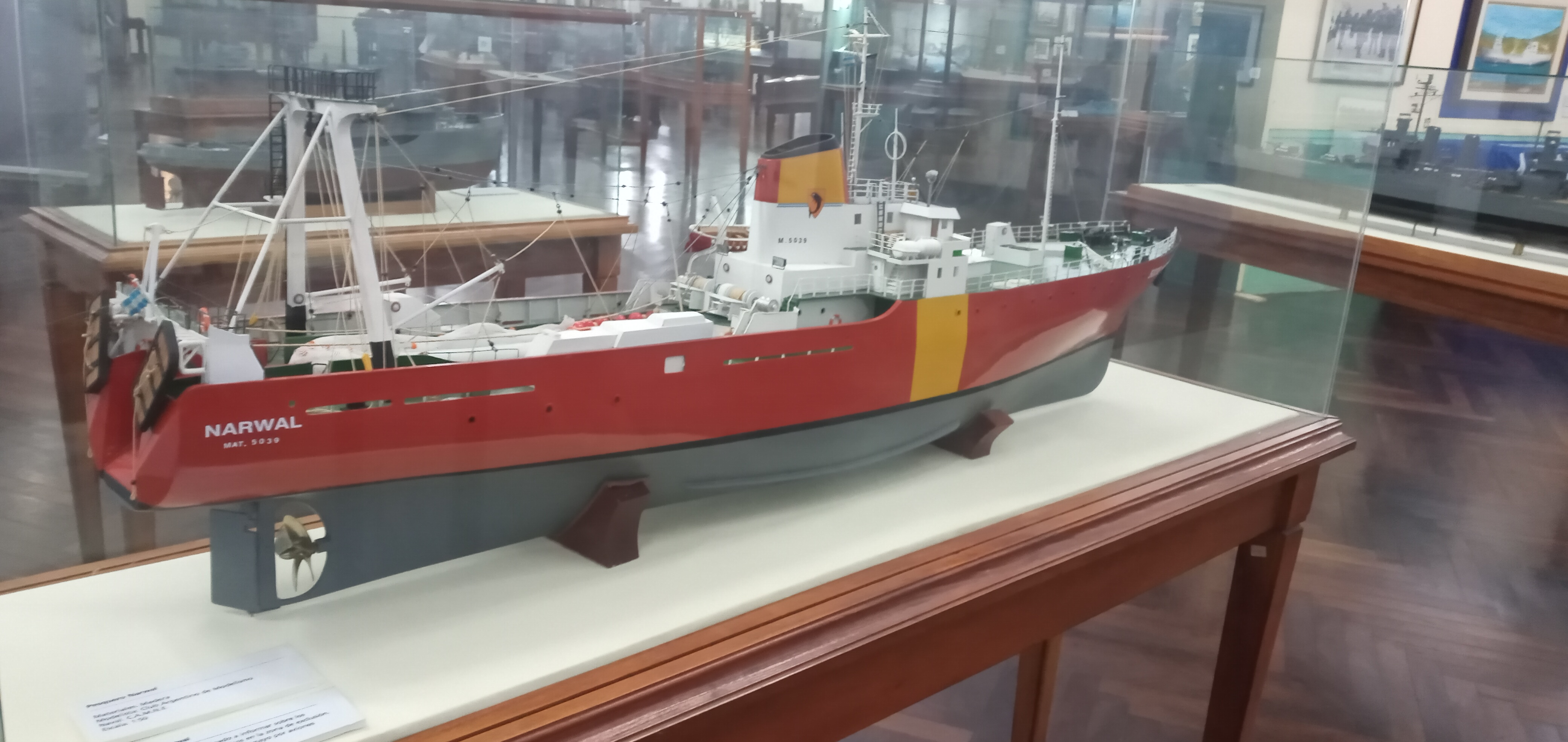
- Model of the FV Narwal

History

Argentina
- Name: Narwal
- Owner: Cia Sudamericana de Pesca
- Builder: Beliard-Murdoch, Ostend
- Launched: 1962
- Identification: IMO number: 5247445
- Honours and awards: Honor al Valor en Combate
- Fate: Sank on 10 May 1982

General characteristics
- Tonnage: 1,398 GRT
- Length: 231 ft (70 m)
- Beam: 38 ft (12 m)
- Draught: 17 ft (5.2 m)
- Installed power: 2330 h.p.
- Propulsion: 2 x diesel engines

The fishing vessel Narwal was an Argentinian trawler, deployed for ELINT operations during the Falklands War and captained by Asterio Wagata.

== Operational history ==
The ship had been given the task of shadowing the British fleet and performing ELINT operations along with other trawlers, and was observed for the first time by British air patrols on 29 April 1982.

Narwal was heavily damaged in an attack by British Sea Harriers from HMS Hermes on 9 May 1982. The ship was hit by a 1000-pound bomb, but it failed to explode as it had been released below the lowest prescribed height and did not arm in time. The bomb caused heavy damage and the Harriers then strafed the Narwal with their 30mm guns. The aircraft were Sea Harriers of Fleet Air Arm 800 Naval Air Squadron, flown by Fl Lt Morgan and Lt Cdr Batt. The two Harriers had been dispatched to Port Stanley for a bombing mission, but the mission was not completed due to low clouds over the target area. On the return leg to Hermes they spotted the ship and obtained permission to engage the target.

A boarding party of British SBS marines reached the target via a Sea King Mk.4 of 846 Naval Air Squadron, escorted by a Sea King Mk.5 helicopter of 820 Naval Air Squadron which carried an additional team of SBS men tasked to provide fire support.

They captured the ship while it was dead in the water, taking off the crew, and the body of Omar Alberto Rupp, the boatswain of the Argentine trawler, killed by the impact of the bomb. Four sailors who had abandoned the Narwal in a small rowing boat were recovered by the Sea King Mk 5.

The Narwal was taken in tow, but sank the next day, 10 May. Among those captured was Captain Juan Carlos González of the Argentine Navy's information services, who was released after the war.

== Aftermath ==
Omar Alberto Rupp was buried at sea by the British on 10 May. Meanwhile, an Aérospatiale SA 330 Puma of the Argentine Army was sent to recover the crew of Narwal after receiving a distress signal, but was shot down by the destroyer HMS Coventry with a Sea Dart missile, killing all three members of the crew.

The flag of Narwal was awarded the Honor al Valor en Combate medal on 28 March 1983.
