= David Morgan (Royal Navy officer) =

Falklands War fighter pilot (born 1947)

- Born: 29 December 1947 (age 78)
- Military career
- Allegiance: United Kingdom
- Branch: Royal Navy; Royal Air Force
- Service years: 1966–1992
- Rank: Lieutenant Commander
- Units: No. 72 Squadron RAF; No. 3 Squadron RAF; 800 Naval Air Squadron; 899 Naval Air Squadron
- Conflicts: Northern Ireland; Falklands War
- Awards: Distinguished Service Cross

David Henry Spencer Morgan is a former British Royal Navy and Royal Air Force (RAF) pilot. He flew on attachment to the Royal Navy's Fleet Air Arm during the 1982 Falklands War, where he was the most successful British fighter pilot of the conflict and was involved in the last dogfight in which British pilots destroyed enemy aircraft.

== Early life ==
Morgan was born on 29 December 1947 in Folkestone, Kent. His father was a World War II naval fighter pilot. He was educated at Sir Roger Manwood's School in Sandwich, Kent, and at the age of 16 he applied for a scholarship to join the Navy where it was discovered that he had a hole in the heart (atrial septal defect), this was successfully operated on. He attended the Britannia Royal Naval College in Dartmouth as an aviator and was commissioned in 1967 going on to be the first British serviceman to become a pilot after having had open heart surgery.

== Early career ==
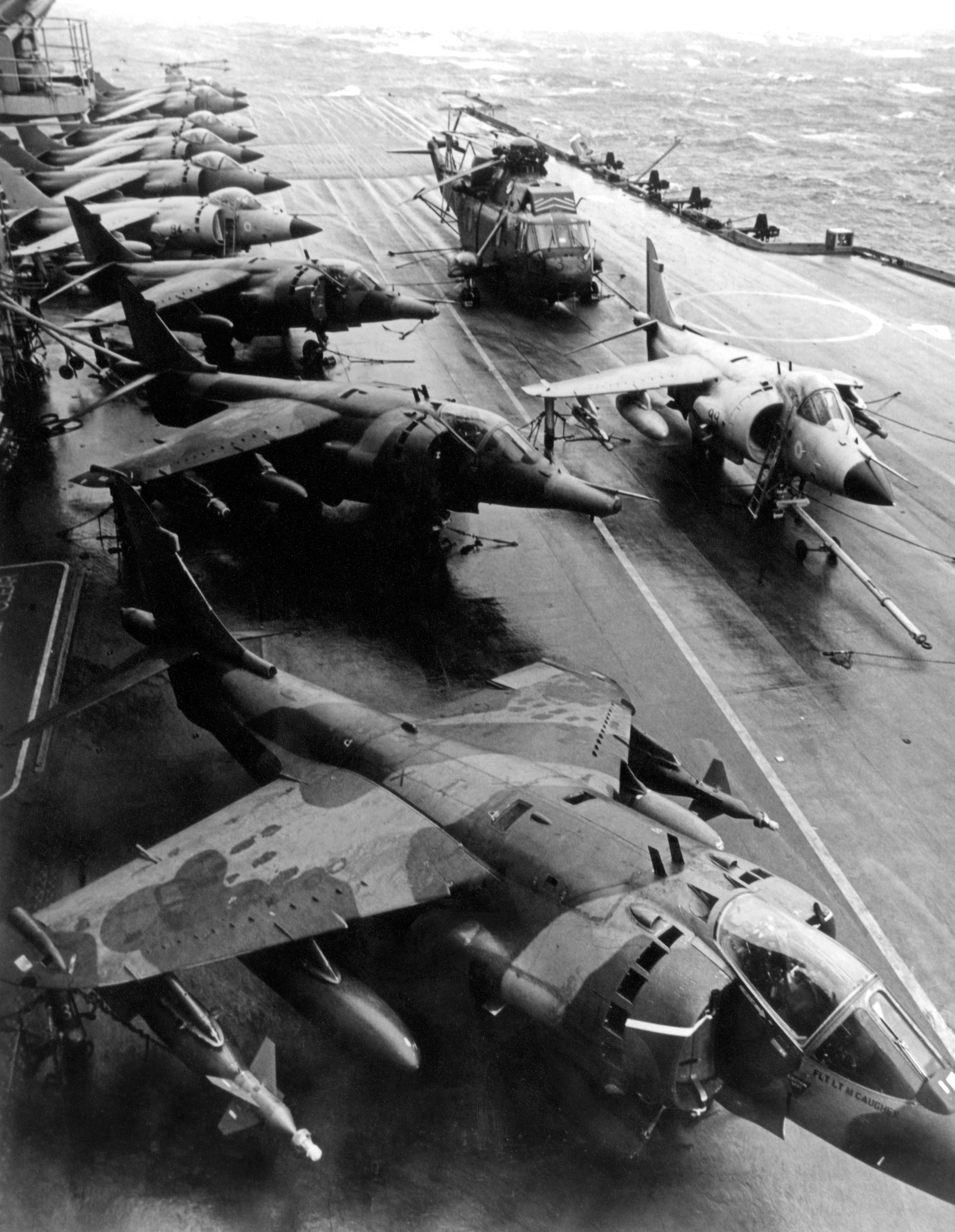
Sea Harriers on board HMS Hermes in the Falklands on 19 May 1982 with three RAF Harrier GR3s in the foreground.

Morgan joined the Fleet Air Arm of the Royal Navy in 1966 but was initially restricted to flying helicopters due to his previous heart operation. He later transferred to the RAF seeking to fly jets. He served as a Wessex helicopter pilot, notably with 72 Squadron in Northern Ireland during the Troubles. He later converted to Harrier jump jets, serving in West Germany. After accumulating nearly 1,000 flying hours, Morgan was attached to 899 Naval Air Squadron of the Fleet Air Arm, for conversion to Sea Harriers when the Falklands War began. Subsequently, he was attached as a Flight Lieutenant to 800 Naval Air Squadron aboard the aircraft carrier HMS Hermes, part of the task force sent to reclaim the islands following the Argentine invasion.

== Falklands War ==
Morgan’s first combat mission of the war took place on 1 May 1982, when he participated in the bombing of Port Stanley airport as one of nine Sea Harriers. Morgan’s aircraft carried three BL755 cluster bombs, designed to maximise damage to the runway and any parked aircraft. During the attack, his aircraft was hit in the tail fin by a 20 mm anti-aircraft round, forcing him to return to Hermes with reduced control.

On 9 May 1982, Morgan, along with Lt Cdr Batt, carried out a strafing attack on the Argentine trawler Narwal, which was conducting intelligence-gathering operations. Narwal was badly damaged, with one crewman killed, and left dead in the water. A boarding party of British SBS reached the vessel via a Sea King of 846 NAS, capturing the ship and evacuating the crew, along with the body of the boatswain, Omar Rupp. Narwal was taken in tow but sank the following day.

On 23 May, flying with his wingman, Flt Lt John Leeming, in the vicinity of Shag Cove, West Falkland, Morgan engaged an Agusta Westland A109 and two Aérospatiale Puma helicopters. The lead Puma crashed after a low pass by Morgan, which some sources attribute to the Harrier’s wingtip vortices disrupting airflow through the rotor disc. The A109 was destroyed in strafing attacks by Morgan and Leeming. Morgan also damaged the second Puma, which was later destroyed by Lt Cdrs Gedge and Braithwaite of 809 NAS.

On 8 June 1982, during what was intended to be a training flight, Morgan was approaching Bluff Cove, where the British landing ships Sir Galahad and Sir Tristram were on fire following an air attack by Argentine Skyhawks. Morgan and his wingman, Lieutenant David Smith, maintained a combat air patrol over the area when they encountered four A-4Bs of Grupo 5 de Caza (English: 5th Fighter Group) attacking LCU Foxtrot 4 from HMS Fearless. The Argentine formation had been assembled from sections of Grupo 5's A-4B force. The Argentine Air Force's official history states that Bolzán attacked Foxtrot 4 and released his bombs, one of which struck and sank the landing craft.

Morgan engaged the Argentine aircraft with AIM-9 Sidewinder, shooting down Bolzán and Vázquez, while Smith shot down Arrarás. The Argentine Air Force subsequently recorded the loss of the three A-4Bs and their pilots.

Morgans Harrier was critically low on fuel. During part of the return flight to Hermes, Morgan glided to conserve fuel. Upon landing, it was determined that he only had enough fuel for 90 seconds of flight.

The engagement between Morgan and Smith and the Argentine Skyhawks was, as of July 2025, the final air-to-air combat in which enemy aircraft were destroyed by British pilots. Morgan’s tally of confirmed kills made him the most successful British fighter pilot during the conflict.

Aircraft destroyed or damaged by Flt Lt David Morgan during the Falklands War
| Date | Location | Aircraft type & S/N | Pilot | Weapon used | Notes |
|---|---|---|---|---|---|
| 23 May 1982 | Shag Cove, West Falkland | SA.330L Puma (CAB 601) | – | Forced down and destroyed | |
| 23 May 1982 | Shag Cove, West Falkland | Agusta A‑109A (CAB 601) | – | 30mm ADEN cannon | Shared with Flt Lt Leeming |
| 23 May 1982 | Shag Cove, West Falkland | SA.330L Puma (CAB 601) | – | 30mm ADEN cannon | Shared with Lt Cdrs Gedge and Braithwaite |
| 8 June 1982 | Choiseul Sound | A-4B Skyhawk (Grupo 5) | Lt Bolzán † | AIM‑9L Sidewinder | |
| 8 June 1982 | Choiseul Sound | A-4B Skyhawk (Grupo 5) | Lt Vázquez † | AIM‑9L Sidewinder | |

Suffering from post-traumatic stress disorder (PTSD) as a result of his combat experiences, Morgan attributed the subsequent termination of his marriage to the disorder.

== Honours and awards ==
- Distinguished Service Cross – for gallant and distinguished service in the South Atlantic.
- General Service Medal (1962) with Northern Ireland clasp – for operational service in 1978.
- South Atlantic Medal with rosette – for service during the Falklands War in 1982.

Morgans citation for his Distinguished Service Cross

The Sea Harrier pilots of 800 and 899 Naval Air Squadrons embarked in HMS HERMES have shown great courage in the air battle over and around the Falkland Islands which started at the end of April and continued throughout May. They were required to fly sortie after sortie, sometimes as many as four per day, often in appalling weather conditions, but remained steadfast and determined under continuous stress and constant danger. Their contribution enabled the Task Force to gain air superiority and thus almost certainly saved many lives which would otherwise have been lost in enemy air attacks. Flight Lieutenant Morgan has flown 50 operational sorties. During one sortie, he attacked a Puma helicopter with guns causing it to crash into a hill and, on a separate occasion, he and his wing man attacked and destroyed an entire formation of four Mirages, Flight Lieutenant Morgan himself shooting down two enemy aircraft.

The London Gazette states "he and his wing man attacked and destroyed an entire formation of four Mirages, Flight Lieutenant Morgan himself shooting down two enemy aircraft." In Morgan's book "Hostile Skies…" (see Bibliography)(Pages 290 - 295) Morgan states that he and his wing-man Dave Smith engaged a flight of four Argentinian A4 Skyhawk aircraft, Morgan destroying two and Smith one. This anomaly is explained by Morgan later in his book (page 300). The combat took place in poor light conditions, Morgan and Smith were unsure if the enemy aircraft had been Skyhawks or Mirages. Their final mission report stated they had engaged Mirages.

== Postwar reconciliation ==
In 1993, Morgan met journalist Maxi Gainza and agreed to meet Héctor Sánchez, the Argentinian pilot he had engaged on 8 June 1982. This meeting was part of a broader reconciliation effort involving veterans from both sides, documented in a series of portraits by Argentine anthropologist Rosana Guberes. Neil Wilkinson met Mariano Velasco, the pilot he shot down, and Simon Weston met Carlos Cachon, the pilot who bombed RFA Sir Galahad with Weston aboard. Morgan maintained contact with Major Roberto Yanzi, pilot of one of the Pumas he had shot down.

In 2018 he met Pablo Bolzán, the son of Danilo Bolzán, accompanied him to the Falkland Islands and placed a memorial next to the wreck of Bolzán's aircraft.

== Later life ==
In 2007 Morgan published a book entitled Hostile Skies: My Falklands Air War, and has also written poetry about his experiences. After the conflict he continued to serve as a Harrier test pilot and instructor. Morgan transferred permanently to the Navy in 1984, and finally left in 1992 holding the rank of Lieutenant Commander. He then became a commercial pilot for Virgin Atlantic. Morgan is married and lives in Dorset, and has two children and five grandchildren.

== Bibliography ==
- Morgan, David (2007). Hostile Skies: My Falklands Air War. Phoenix. p. 320. ISBN 978-0-7538-2199-2.
