= 800 Naval Air Squadron =

Inactive flying squadron of the Royal Navy's Fleet Air Arm

- Squadron badge
- Active: Royal Air Force; 1933–1939; Royal Navy: 1939–1945; 1946–1950; 1951–1954; 1954–1956; 1956–1959; 1959–1964; 1964–1972; 1980–2004; 2006–2011
- Disbanded: 28 January 2011
- Country: United Kingdom
- Branch: Royal Navy
- Type: Single-seat fighter squadron
- Role: Carrier-based fighter squadron
- Part of: Fleet Air Arm
- Mottos: Nunquam non-paratus (Latin for 'Never unprepared')
- Aircraft: See Aircraft flown section for full list.
- Engagements: World War II; Korean War; Suez Crisis; Falklands War; NATO intervention in Bosnia and Herzegovina
- Battle honours: Norway 1940–44; Mediterranean 1940–41; Spartivento 1940; Malta Convoys 1941–42; "Bismarck" 1941; Diego Suarez 1942; North Africa 1942; Normandy 1944; South France 1944; Aegean 1944; Burma 1945; Malaya 1945; East Indies 1945; Korea 1950; Falkland Islands 1982

Commanders
- Notable commanders: Lieutenant Commander(A) Stanley Orr, RNVR (1944); Lieutenant Commander Raymond Lygo, RN (1954–56); Lieutenant Commander Andy Auld, RN (1982–83)

Insignia
- Squadron Badge Description: Blue, in front of a trident erect two swords in saltire point upward winged at the hilt all gold (1937)
- Identification Markings: 501-510 (Nimrod); 102–109, 120 (Nimrod May 1936); 208–210 (Osprey); 123–125 (Osprey May 1936); 102–109 (Osprey; December 1938); single letters (Skua); A6A+ (Skua May 1939); 6A+ (Skua October 1940); single letters (Fulmar from May 1941); 6A+ (Fulmar February 1942); single letters (Sea Hurricane); single letters (Hellcat); E:A+ (Hellcat on Emperor December 1943); C3A+ (Hellcat February 1945); K3A+ (Hellcat by May 1945); single letters (Seafire); 171–182 (Seafire); 101–112 (Attacker); 100–113 (Sea Hawk); 100–113 (Scimitar); also 800B 114–117 (Scimitar); 100–115 (Buccaneer); 250–254 (Sea Harrier); 123–126 (Sea Harrier April 1981)
- Fin Carrier Codes: P (Seafire); J (Attacker); O:J:Z:R (Sea Hawk); R (Scimitar); also 800B E (Scimitar); E (Buccaneer); N:H:L (Sea Harrier April 1981)

800 Naval Air Squadron (800 NAS) also referred to as 800 Squadron, is an inactive Fleet Air Arm (FAA) naval air squadron of the United Kingdom's Royal Navy (RN). It most recently operated the Harrier II GR.7/7A/9/9A V/STOL strike aircraft, as part of Joint Force Harrier (JFH), at RAF Cottesmore, Rutland, from March 2006 until January 2011.

Formed on 3 April 1933 by amalgamating No's 402 and 404 (Fleet Fighter) Flights. Operating as a carrier-based fighter squadron, it served throughout the Second World War. During the Korean War, it flew Supermarine Seafire. These were followed with the Supermarine Attacker in the mid-1950s, then the Hawker Sea Hawk during the Suez Crisis, and later the Supermarine Scimitar and Blackburn Buccaneer during the 1960s. The squadron flew the Sea Harrier throughout the 1980s, 1990s and early 2000s, notably during the Falklands War.

== History ==
=== 1930s ===
800 Squadron of the Fleet Air Arm was established on 3 April 1933, at RAF Netheravon in Wiltshire, through the amalgamation of Nos. 402 and 404 (Fleet Fighter) Flights, FAA, within the Royal Air Force.

The squadron was first equipped with nine single-seat Hawker Nimrod fighter aircraft and three two-seat Hawker Ospreys to act as navigation leaders for the Nimrods. It served aboard HMS Courageous in the Home Fleet. In 1935–1936, the carrier and squadron operated in the Mediterranean. The squadron re-equipped with Blackburn Skua in November 1938 and took these aboard the aircraft carrier HMS Ark Royal. The Skua was a dive bomber with a secondary fighter role to allow the destruction or driving-off of enemy reconnaissance aircraft.

In 1939, 800 Squadron predominantly operated Blackburn Skuas, along with a limited number of Blackburn Rocs. from HMS Ark Royal. The squadron was transferred to Admiralty control on 24 May 1939.

=== Second World War (1939-1945) ===
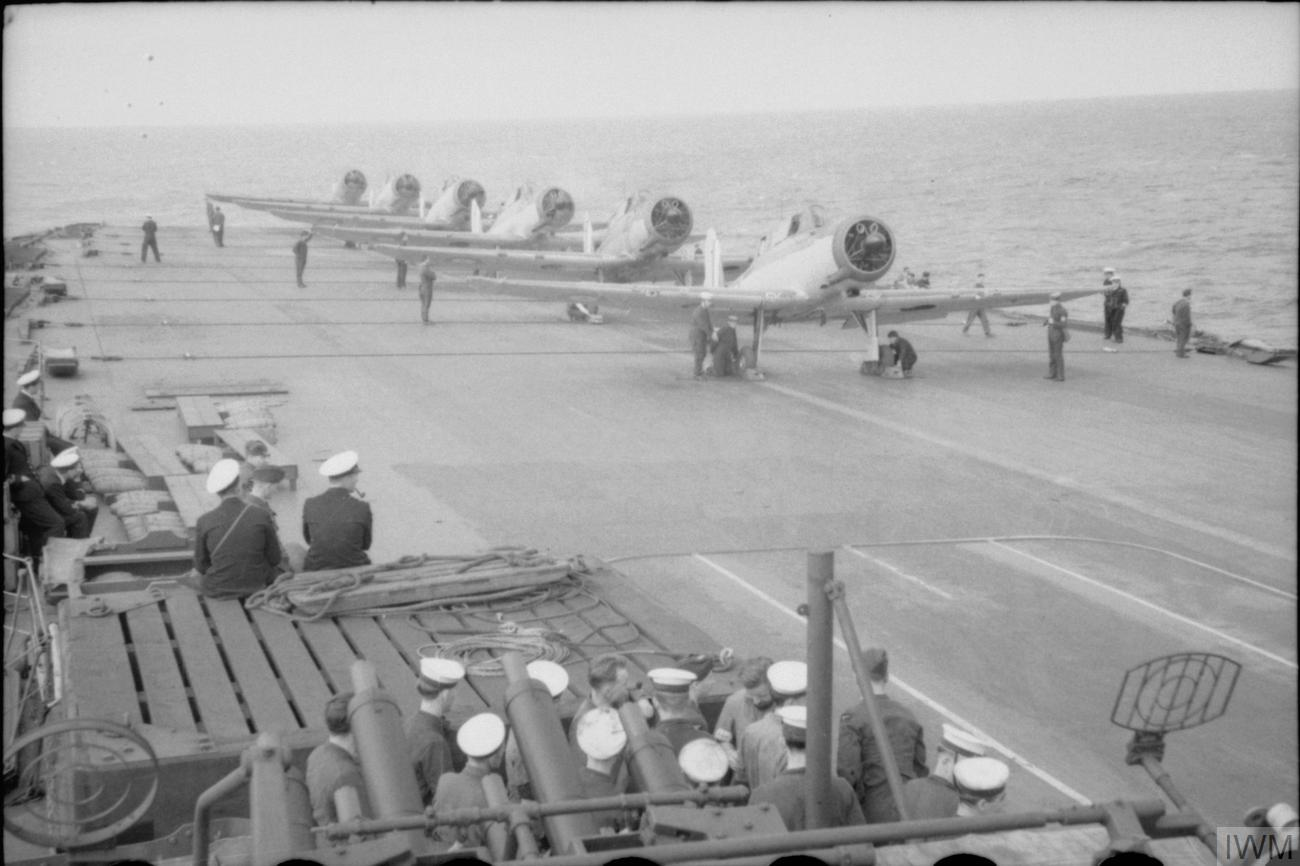
Six Skua Mk.IIs of 800 Squadron line up on deck before taking off from Ark Royal

During the German invasion of Norway in 1940, whilst based at RNAS Hatston, Kirkwall, Mainland, Orkney, 800 and 803 Squadrons dive-bombed the German cruiser Königsberg at Bergen on 10 April 1940, 800 Squadron providing five Blackburn Skuas to the force that sank the light cruiser.

The squadron embarked on HMS Ark Royal later that month, with the aircraft carrier's aircraft providing air cover to the fleet and to Allied troops. 800 Squadron's Blackburn Skua's claimed six Heinkel He 111 medium bombers shot down and a further as probably destroyed. On 13 June 1940, HMS Ark Royal launched a dive bomber attack against the German Battleship Scharnhorst, under repair at Trondheim, with 800 Squadron losing four out of six Blackburn Skuas. The Squadron's commanding officer, Captain R.T. Partridge, RM was taken prisoner, while 803 Squadron lost four Blackburn Skuas from nine. In July 1940, the squadron was involved in the attack on the French Fleet at Oran. Two SM.79 bombers were shot down off Sardinia.

The squadron was regrouped with Fairey Fulmars in Gibraltar during April 1941, proceeding with two flights to HMS Victorious to search for the Bismarck, and to Argus. On regrouping later that year, the squadron joined Furious for an attack on Petsamo, and after the West Indies onboard Indomitable was involved in the Madagascar operations.

The squadron received new equipment in the form of Hawker Sea Hurricanes, which were deployed to the Avenger-class escort carrier HMS Biter, originating from RNAS Hatston (HMS Sparrowhawk) on 9 October for Operation Torch, the landings in North Africa. Upon their return to the United Kingdom, the squadron offloaded their aircraft at RNAS Machrihanish, (HMS Landrail), Argyll and Bute, on 19 November.

The Grumman Hellcat fighter aircraft was introduced into service with the Fleet Air Arm on 1 July 1943, when 800 Naval Air Squadron transitioned from the Hawker Sea Hurricane. This aircraft served as the British counterpart to the US Navy's F6F-3 variant, featuring the Pratt & Whitney R-2800 Double Wasp engine and designated as Hellcat F. Mk. I within the Royal Navy. The squadron, operating from Emperor provided escort for Fairey Barracudas in the April 1944 attacks from against the Tirpitz in Alta Fjord, Norway.

=== Seafire (1946–1950) ===
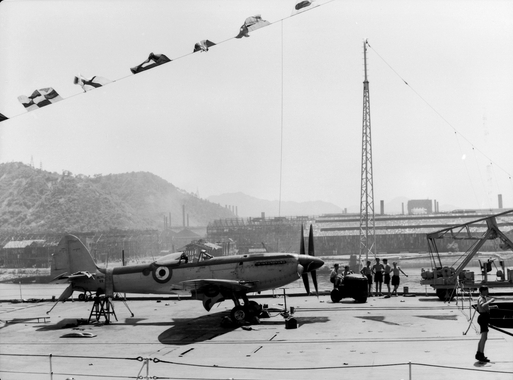
Seafire F Mk.47; of the type was used operationally in the Korean War by 800 Squadron, seen on Unicorn

During the Korean War, the squadron and its Supermarine Seafire F Mk.47 fighter aircraft were embarked in the Colossus-class aircraft carrier HMS Triumph as part of the 13th Carrier Air Group (13 CAG) and their first operation was a strike by twelve Seafires, along with nine Fairey Fireflies of 827 Naval Air Squadron, also part of 13 CAG, on Haeju airfield on 3 July 1950. Because of their short range, the Seafires were frequently given the Combat Air Patrol task over the fleet. During Operation Chromite, the Inchon landings in September 1950, Seafires flew armed reconnaissance missions and spotted for the bombarding cruisers. But, by the end of the month, 800 Naval Air Squadron had only three serviceable aircraft and no replacements were available in the Far East. The inevitable crop of landing accidents, including one which claimed the life of 800 Naval Air Squadron commanding officer, Lieutenant Commander I.M. MacLachlan, RN, on 29 August 1950 and the cumulative airframe stress damage meant the end of the Seafire's operational life.

During the Korean War the squadron flew 245 offensive patrols and 115 ground attack sorties before HMS Triumph was replaced by her sister ship HMS Theseus with its carrier air group of 807 Squadron, with Sea Furies and 810 Squadron, with Fairey Fireflies.

=== Attacker (1951–1954) ===
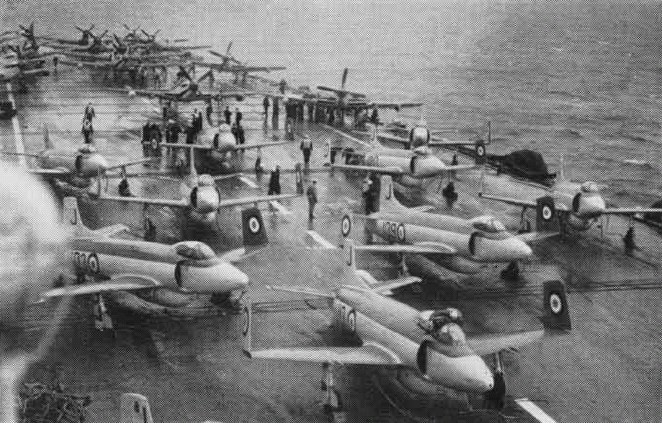
800 Squadron Attacker FB.2s on Eagle in 1952/53

In August 1951 the Supermarine Attacker entered service with the squadron when it re-formed at HMS Peregrine the Royal Naval Air Station at Ford, West Sussex, under the leadership of Lieutenant Commander G.C. Baldwin, DSC and Bar, RN. It later embarked in the Audacious-class aircraft carrier HMS Eagle. It was the first jet fighter to be standardised in the Fleet Air Arms first-line squadrons. On 4 March 1952, the squadron commenced carrier operations, embarking on HMS Eagle for a three-week training period, returning to RNAS Ford on later in the month.

Operating within the 13th Carrier Air Group, it conducted multiple deployments in both home waters and the Mediterranean aboard HMS Eagle. On 3 December 1952 the Carrier Air Group was disbanded, although both squadrons continued to be assigned to the carrier. They established a routine of alternating one month at sea and one month on land until the spring of 1954. By 1953 the squadron had upgraded to the FB.2 version of the Attacker, but the following year the Attacker was withdrawn from frontline service and the aircraft passed to training and reserve units.

=== Sea Hawk (1954–1959) ===
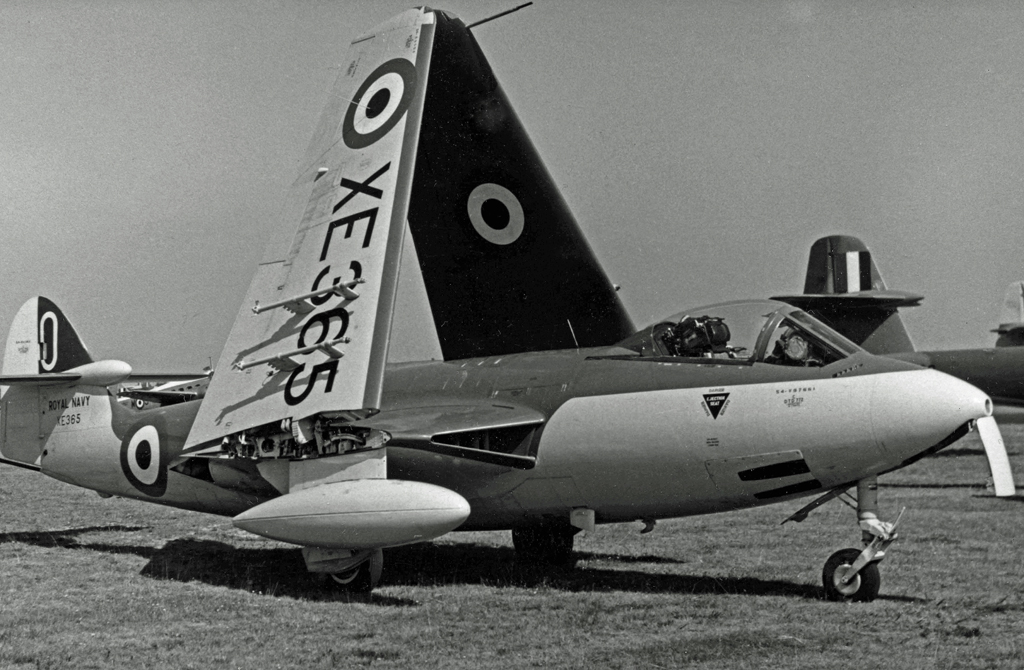
Sea Hawk FGA 6 of 800 Squadron in 1955

800 Naval Air Squadron then recommissioned with Armstrong Whitworth Sea Hawk FB.3s in November 1954, at RNAS Brawdy (HMS Goldcrest), Pembrokeshire and joined the newly commissioned Audacious-class aircraft carrier HMS Ark Royal the following year. As with other FAA Sea Hawk units at the time, the sqn operated later marks of Sea Hawk as they became available culminating in the FGA. 4 and FGA.6 by the time it embarked on the carrier. The squadron was disbanded in April 1956, only to be reconstituted the subsequent month with Hawker Sea Hawk. In November, it was deployed aboard the Centaur-class light fleet carrier HMS Albion, engaging in assaults on airfields and various targets as part of Operation Musketeer during the Suez Crisis. In 1958, the squadron had another period of service on HMS Ark Royal before returning to RNAS Brawdy, where it ultimately disbanded in March 1959.

Also in 1958, the squadron formed a seven-aircraft Hawker Sea Hawk display formation for the Farnborough Airshow. The aircraft were equipped with smoke systems and the formation was disbanded after the display season. No sufficiently reliable evidence has been established for a separate enduring name for the formation. During the 1950s, 800's aircraft usually had the tails painted red, and this evolved into a forward pointing red arrowhead design with crossed swords over a trident in yellow in the centre.

=== Scimitar (1959–1964) ===
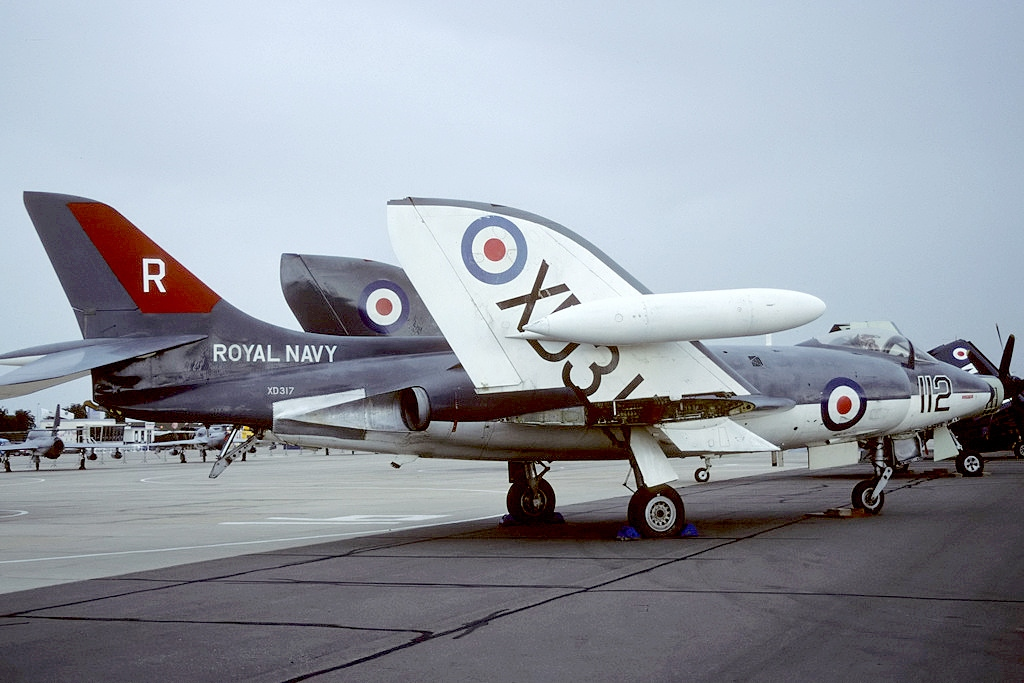
Scimitar F.1 in the markings of 800 Squadron, Ark Royal

The Supermarine Scimitar represented the inaugural implementation of a swept-wing, single-seat fighter by the FAA, marking a significant advancement as the first aircraft in the FAA to achieve supersonic speeds. Additionally, it was the first aircraft operated by the FAA to be equipped with the capability to carry an atomic bomb. 800 Naval Air Squadron next reformed in July 1959 as a Supermarine Scimitar F.1 unit with six aircraft, under the command of Lieutenant Commander D.P. Norman, AFC, RN, at RNAS Lossiemouth (HMS Fulmar), Moray, later re-joining HMS Ark Royal's air group in March 1960.

Throughout the summer of 1961, Scimitar aerobatic displays over RNAS Lossiemouth were a common sight, as 800 Naval Air Squadron was designated as the Royal Naval Aerobatic Team for that year, performing at the '24th Salon de L'Aeronautique' (Paris Air Show), four RNAS Air Days, one Navy Day, and culminating in the SBAC Farnborough Air Show. After operating worldwide from the Ark, 800 returned to 'Lossie' in December 1963 and disbanded in February 1964, its aircraft being passed to 803 Naval Air Squadron to bring that unit up to sixteen aircraft.

=== Buccaneer (1964–1972) ===
A month later 800 Naval Air Squadron recommissioned at RNAS Lossiemouth as a Blackburn Buccaneer squadron equipped with eight Buccaneer S.1 for service on the newly refitted HMS Eagle. 800B Flight, which is related yet distinct, assembled with four Scimitar F.1 aircraft at RNAS Lossiemouth in September, to explore the operational methodologies of air-to-air refuelling. The latter aircraft were for the next two years operated by 800B Flight, their aircraft adorned with a 'foaming tankard' badge on their tails as they were to be used as in-flight refuelling tankers as the underpowered Buccaneer S.1 could not be launched from a carrier with a full weapons load and full fuel tanks. The Buccaneers were launched fully armed but with a light fuel load, and would then 'top up' from waiting Scimitars which had been launched previously. The squadron was the only FAA squadron organised this way, and it was an interim measure pending the arrival of the Buccaneer S.2. In June 1966 the S.2s began to replace the S.1s and the Scimitars, completing the process by November of that year.

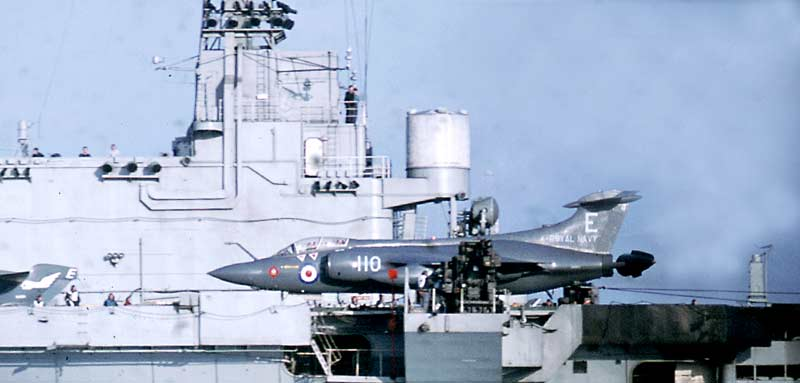
A Buccaneer S.2 of 800 Squadron having just landed on Eagle

In March 1967 the oil tanker Torrey Canyon ran aground on Seven Stones Reef near Land's End and started to leak thousands of tons of crude oil into the sea, putting nearby beaches at risk of pollution. In an attempt to minimise the damage to the environment, the Buccaneers of 800 Naval Air Squadron along with those of the training squadron 736 Naval Air Squadron were ordered to destroy the tanker and its cargo. Flying from RNAS Brawdy in Wales on 28 March 1967, eight Buccaneers dropped 42000 lbs of high explosive bombs and achieved a 75% success rate. The aim was to rip open the hull of the tanker to release its cargo then set fire to it on the open sea, destroying the oil before it reached the beaches. After this the squadron rejoined Eagle for the remainder of her career.

During this period the squadron operated 14 Buccaneer S.2s, and as with its sister squadron 809 Naval Air Squadron aboard Ark Royal in the 1970s, the squadron normally kept ten strike aircraft ready, two more fitted with a specially designed reconnaissance pallet in the rotating bomb bay, and the final two aircraft were fitted with buddy refuelling pods as tanker aircraft. After covering the British withdrawal from 'East of Suez' Eagle returned home to pay off in January 1972, her squadrons flown back to their shore bases to disband. 800 Squadron returned to Lossiemouth and disbanded on 23 February 1972, and its aircraft were passed to the RAF.

=== Sea Harrier (1980–2004) ===
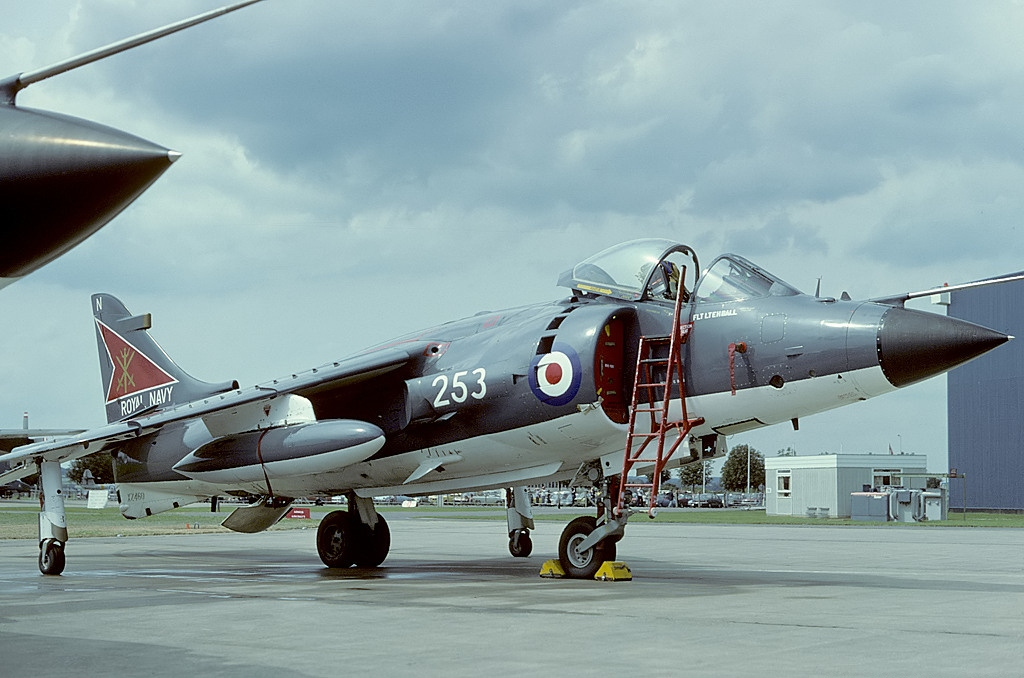
Sea Harrier FRS.1, 800 Squadron

The British Aerospace Sea Harrier was a variant of a family of subsonic aircraft capable of vertical and/or short take-off and landing (V/STOL), designed for various roles including strike missions, reconnaissance, and air combat. It was introduced into service with the Royal Navy in June 1979 under the designation Sea Harrier FRS.1, and it was colloquially referred to as the 'Shar'. On 31 March 1980, 800 Naval Air Squadron was recommissioned as the inaugural front-line squadron for the Sea Harrier, equipped with four Sea Harrier FRS.1 aircraft at RNAS Yeovilton (HMS Heron) in Somerset.

Under the command of Lieutenant Commander Tim Gedge, a former Phantom FG1 pilot, it embarked in the lead ship of a new class of light aircraft carrier HMS Invincible until June 1981 when it transferred to the Centaur-class aircraft carrier HMS Hermes, which had recently undergone modifications to include a 12° ski-jump and the necessary facilities for operating the Sea Harrier.

==== Falklands War ====
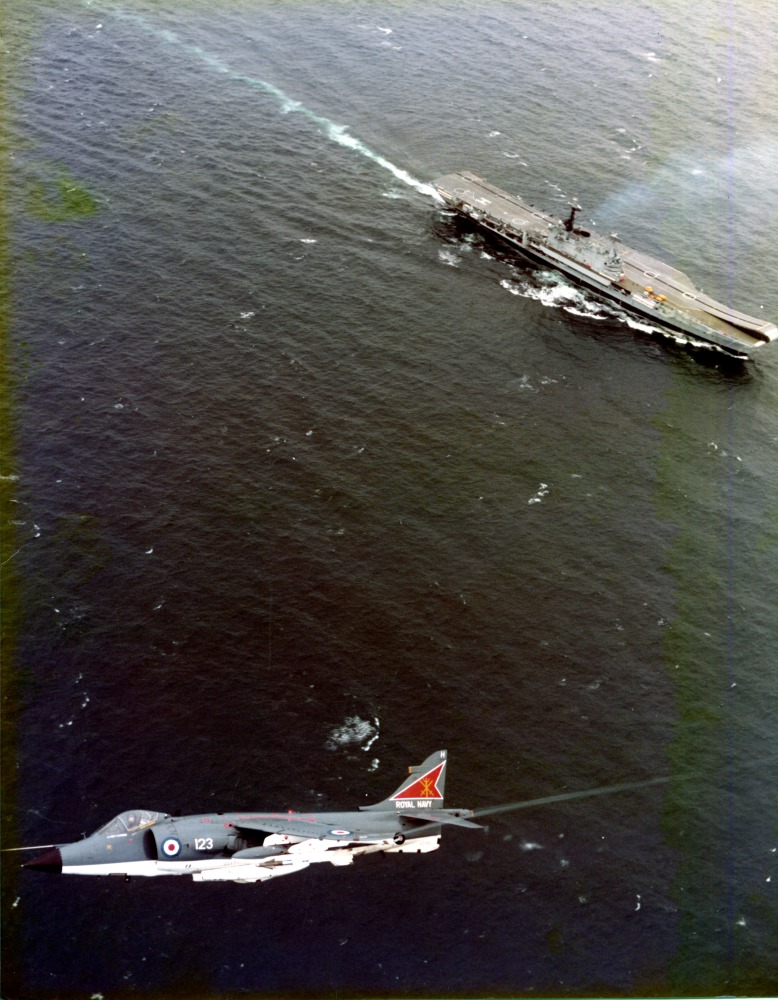
800 Squadron Sea Harrier FRS.1 over Hermes

On the outbreak of the Falklands War 800 Naval Air Squadron, now under the command of Lieutenant Commander Andy Auld, was brought up to its wartime strength of twelve Sea Harrier FRS1s by transferring four aircraft and their crews from the Sea Harrier Headquarters Squadron 899 Naval Air Squadron, with a further three Sea Harriers taken from storage or trials use. The squadron embarked in HMS Hermes whilst she was still alongside in Portsmouth Dockyard. The other front line Sea Harrier squadron, 801 Naval Air Squadron, was embarked in HMS Invincible similarly received four aircraft.

Two of the squadron's planes were lost. On 4 May 1982, Lieutenant Nicholas Taylor's Sea Harrier sustained damage from anti-aircraft fire, exploded and hit the ground, while approaching to attack the Goose Green airstrip. Lieutenant Commander Gordon Batt, DSC, was killed in action flying a Sea Harrier from HMS Hermes on 23 May 1982.

During the conflict 809 Naval Air Squadron was formed by former 800 Squadron commanding officer, Tim Gedge, with eight spare Sea Harrier and sent south aboard the SS Atlantic Conveyor and on arrival in the South Atlantic these aircraft were divided between the two carriers, four each to 800 and 800 Squadron. The aircraft were absorbed into these squadrons, as the 899 aircraft had been, but remained recognisable as they had been painted in light grey low visibility camouflage as opposed to the dark sea grey scheme used by all the other Sea Harriers.

800 Squadron Sea Harriers destroyed 17 Argentine aircraft.

- 1 May 1982 – Pucará of FAA Grupo 3 destroyed at Goose Green by Lieutenant Commander Frederiksen, Lieutenant Hale and Lieutenant McHarg using cluster bombs. Two others damaged.
- 1 May 1982 – Dagger A of FAA Grupo 6 shot down over East Falkland by Flight Lieutenant Penfold, RAF, with a Sidewinder. Lieutenant Ardiles killed.
- 9 May 1982 – A-4C Skyhawk of FAA Grupo 4 shot down near Chartres, West Falkland by Lieutenant Commander Blissett using a Sidewinder. (The second Skyhawk in the same action was destroyed by Lieutenant Commander Stephen Thomas from 801 Naval Air Squadron).
- 9 May 1982 – Dagger A of FAA Grupo 6 shot down near Teal River Inlet, West Falkland by Lieutenant Commander Frederiksen with a Sidewinder. Lieutenant Luna ejected.
- 9 May 1982 – A-4Q Skyhawk of CANA 3 Esc shot down near Swan Islands, Falkland Sound by Lieutenant Morrell with a Sidewinder. Lieutenant Commander Philippi ejected.
- 9 May 1982 – A-4Q Skyhawk of CANA 3 Esc shot down in the same action by Flight Lieutenant Leeming, RAF, using 30mm cannon. Lieutenant Marquez killed.
- 9 May 1982 – A-4Q Skyhawk of CANA 3 Esc damaged by HMS Ardent fire and by Lieutenant Morrell with 30mm cannon; unable to land, Lieutenant Arca ejected.
- 23 May 1982 – Puma SA.330L of CAB 601 crashed near Shag Cove House while evading Flight Lieutenant Morgan, RAF. Crew escaped.
- 23 May 1982 – Agusta A 109 of CAB 601 destroyed on the ground at Shag Cove House by Flight Lieutenant Morgan, RAF and Flight Lieutenant Leeming, RAF, with 30mm cannon
- 23 May 1982 – Puma SA.330L of CAB 601 damaged by Flight Lieutenant Morgan, RAF and later destroyed at Shag Cove House by 801 Squadron pilots.
- 23 May 1982 – Dagger A of FAA Grupo 6 shot down over Pebble Island by Lieutenant Hale with a Sidewinder. Lieutenant Volponi killed.
- 24 May 1982 – Three Dagger As of FAA Grupo 6 shot down north of Pebble Island by Lieutenant Commander Auld and Lieutenant D. Smith using Sidewinders. Major Puga and Captain Diaz ejected, Lieutenant Castillo killed.
- 8 June 1982 – Three A-4B Skyhawks of FAA Grupo 5 shot down over Choiseul Sound by Flight Lieutenant Morgan, RAF and Lieutenant D. Smith using Sidewinders. Lieutenants Arraras, Bolzan and Ensign Vazquez killed.

Some "kills" are claimed jointly or disputed (Puma at Shag Cove)

==== Post-Falklands ====
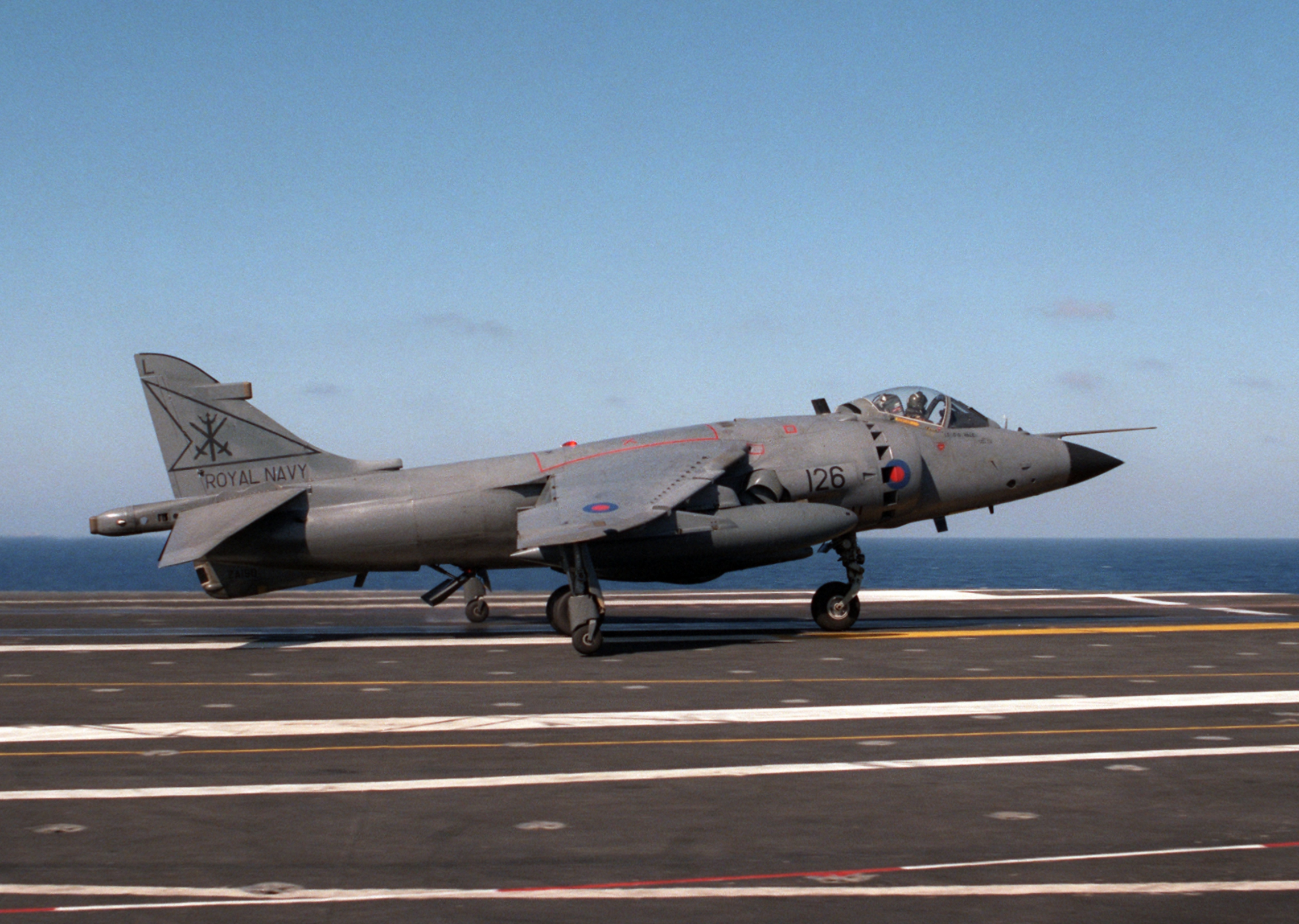
Sea Harrier FRS.1 from 800 Squadron takes off from the United States Navy's Dwight D. Eisenhower in 1984

Following the Falklands War, 800 Naval Air Squadron operated from the newly completed Invincible-class light aircraft carrier HMS Illustrious, from September 1983, followed by further movements between HMS Illustrious and RNAS Yeovilton during the month. The squadron continued to operate in association with the aircraft carrier during 1984, with movements to and from HMS Illustrious recorded in January, April, June, September and November. The carrier's recorded air group for 1983–84 included 800 NAS with eight Sea Harrier FRS.1 aircraft; the same strength is listed for its November 1984 amphibious operations. Sea Harriers deployed aboard HMS Illustrious after the Falklands conflict were modified with double racks for AIM-9L Sidewinder missiles and larger external fuel tanks, which increased their missile capacity, range and time on station.

The carrier with 800 was deployed to Westlant in the autumn of 1985, took part in Global 86 from July to December 1986, went on a Mediterranean cruise in the spring of 1988, and came back to Westlant in late autumn of 1988. In June 1989, the squadron returned to HMS Invincible and subsequently redeployed to Westlant from October 1989 to February 1990, with a disembarkation at Naval Air Station Cecil Field, Florida, during the Christmas and New Year period.

In 1991, the carrier mainly operated in domestic waters before being deployed to the Far East from May to November 1992. In July 1993, now led by Lieutenant Commander Chris Neave, 800 was deployed aboard HMS Invincible to assume responsibilities related to the Bosnian War. The Sea Harriers conducted reconnaissance, Combat Air Patrol (CAP) operations, and provided close air support using 1000-pound Paveway II laser-guided bombs. The squadron returned to the UK in January 1994, and then redeployed for Operation Deny Flight in the Adriatic from August 1994 to February 1995. Between September 1994 and February 1995, the Sea Harrier FRS.1 aircraft conducted over 360 sorties in support of the United Nations' operation.An 800 Sea Harrier ditched in the Adriatic Sea, near the Bosnian coast, during a hovering manoeuvre adjacent to HMS Invincible. The pilot, Lieutenant Kistruck, successfully ejected. The aircraft was retrieved from a depth of 720 meters and, following restoration efforts, was transferred to the Fleet Air Arm Museum in 2000.

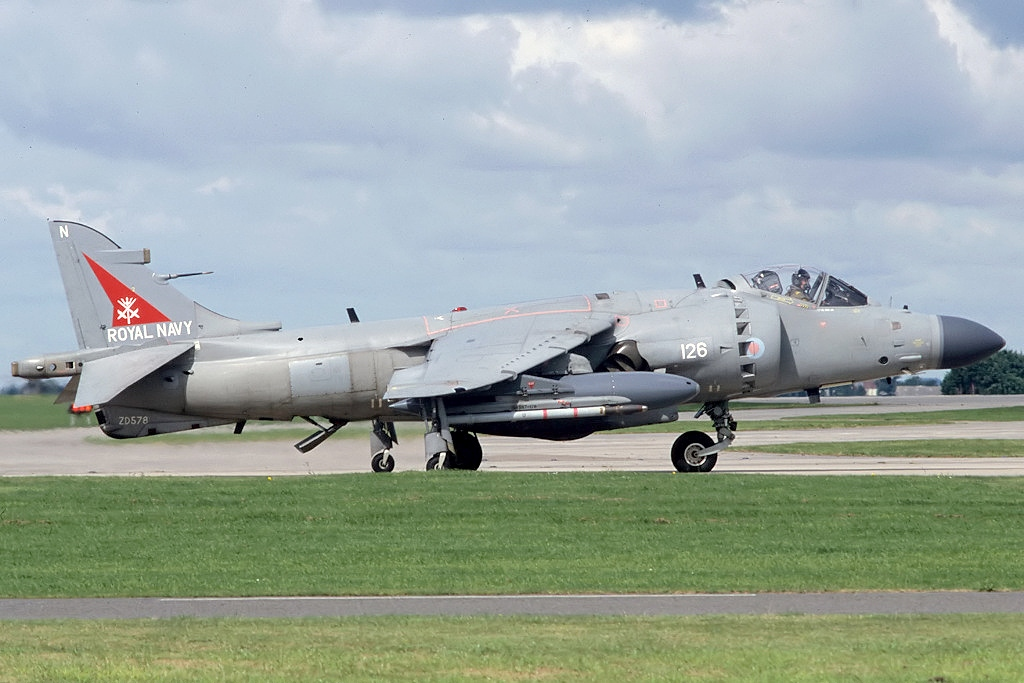
Sea Harrier FA2, 800 Squadron

In 1995, the squadron transitioned to the more advanced Sea Harrier FA.2, which featured enhancements over the FRS.1 model, including a superior Rolls-Royce Pegasus Mk.106 engine, extended operational range, the Blue Vixen look-down radar system, a greater capacity for air-to-air munitions, compatibility with AIM-120 AMRAAM missiles, and enhanced cockpit instrumentation.

In Autumn 1996, the squadron deployed on HMS Invincible to the Mediterranean for NATO exercises, then moved through the Suez Canal into the Gulf in November. After joint exercises with the US Navy, marking the first British carrier visit to Kuwait in 30 years, HMS Invincible returned to the UK for Christmas. Following work-up in May 1997, the carrier sailed to the US in September, conducting exercises with USN Grumman F-14 Tomcats and McDonnell Douglas F/A-18 Hornets at NAS Oceana before operations in the Adriatic in January and into the Gulf in February 1998. In January 1998, in addition to 800's Sea Harrier FA.2s, RAF Harrier GR.7s operated from Invincible in the Persian Gulf, typically in a mix of seven FA.2s and seven GR.7s. Much of 1998 involved training with HMS Invincible. Although the carrier was deployed to the Gulf from February to March 1999 and to the Adriatic from April to May, working alongside embarked Royal Air Force Harriers. Finally, in late September, the squadron was deployed to the US for weapons training.

In 2000, 800 became a subordinate unit within Joint Force Harrier (JFH) which was established on 1 April under the leadership of Rear Admiral Iain Henderson, CB, CBE, DL, RN, integrating the Royal Navy's Sea Harrier and Royal Air Force's Harrier squadrons into a unified command structure.

800 Squadron maintained operations embarked in HMS Invincible, which included a deployment to the Mediterranean in late 2000, before transitioning to HMS Ark Royal in September 2001. In 2002, the squadron undertook two deployments to the Mediterranean in HMS Ark Royal, and in June 2003, it conducted a flight to Malaysia and back for an exercise, supported by an air-to-air refueling operation, followed by another refueling operation to and from Nevada and California for weapons training.

On 31 March 2004, while at in RNAS Yeovilton the squadron was disbanded following the 2002 Ministry of Defence announcement that the Sea Harrier would be retired from active service between 2004 and 2006, which was 6 to 8 years ahead of its originally scheduled out-of-service date.

=== Harrier II (2006–2011) ===
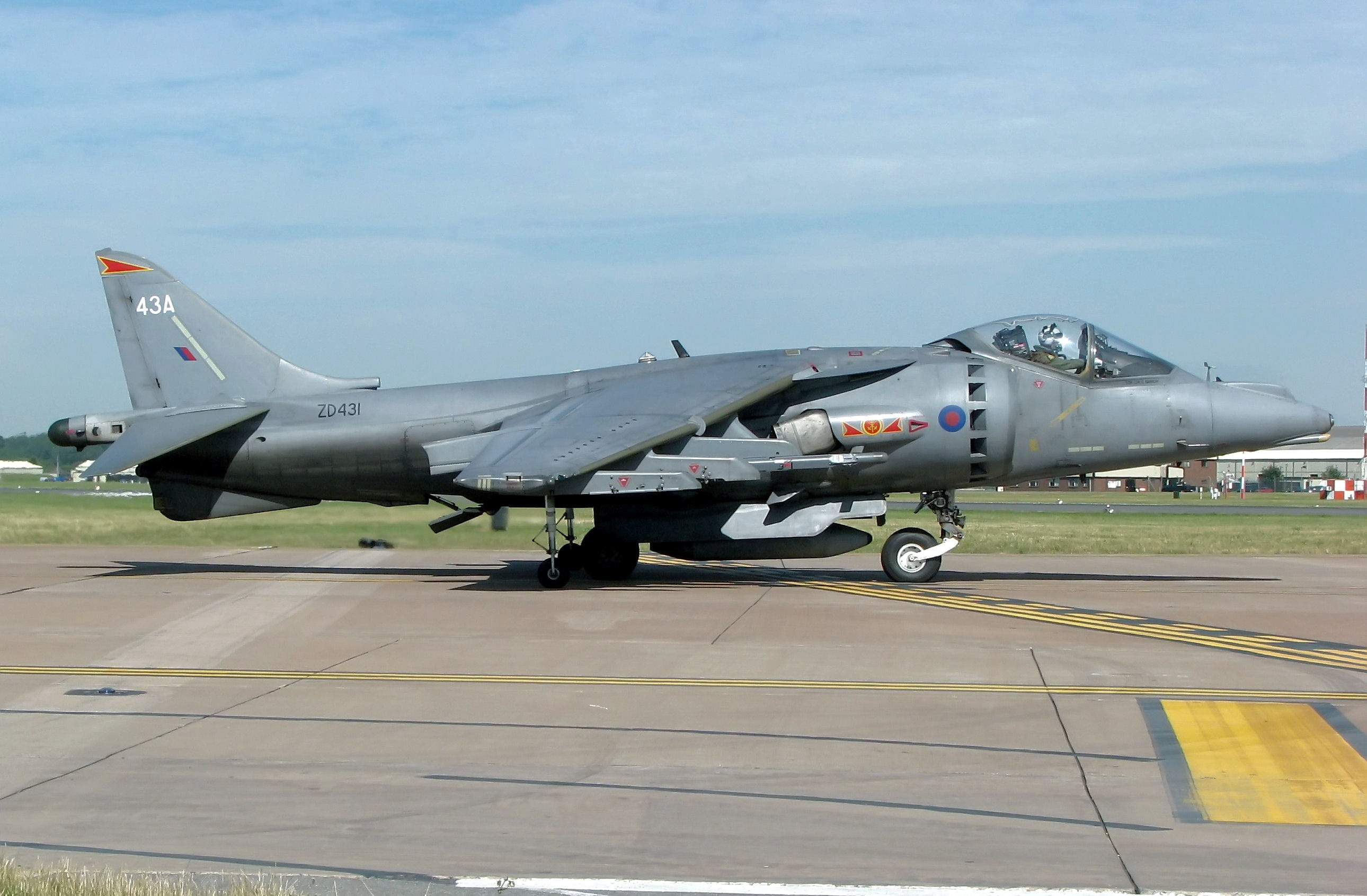
Harrier GR7 of 800 Squadron in 2006

Two years later, on 31 March 2006, 800 Naval Air Squadron was officially re-commissioned under the command of Commander Adrian Orchard, within Joint Force Harrier at RAF Cottesmore. The subsequent day, No. 3 Squadron had relocated to RAF Coningsby to transition to the Eurofighter Typhoon. The ex-3 Squadron Harrier GR7/7As were reassigned to reinstate 800.

The Harrier GR7 represented an upgraded variant of the original British Aerospace Harrier II, a second-generation vertical/short takeoff and landing (V/STOL) jet aircraft that developed from the McDonnell Douglas AV-8B Harrier II. In contrast to the Sea Harrier, which was mainly used as a carrier-based interceptor, the Harrier II was specifically engineered for air interdiction and close air support operations, indicating a notable transformation in the squadron's operational role.

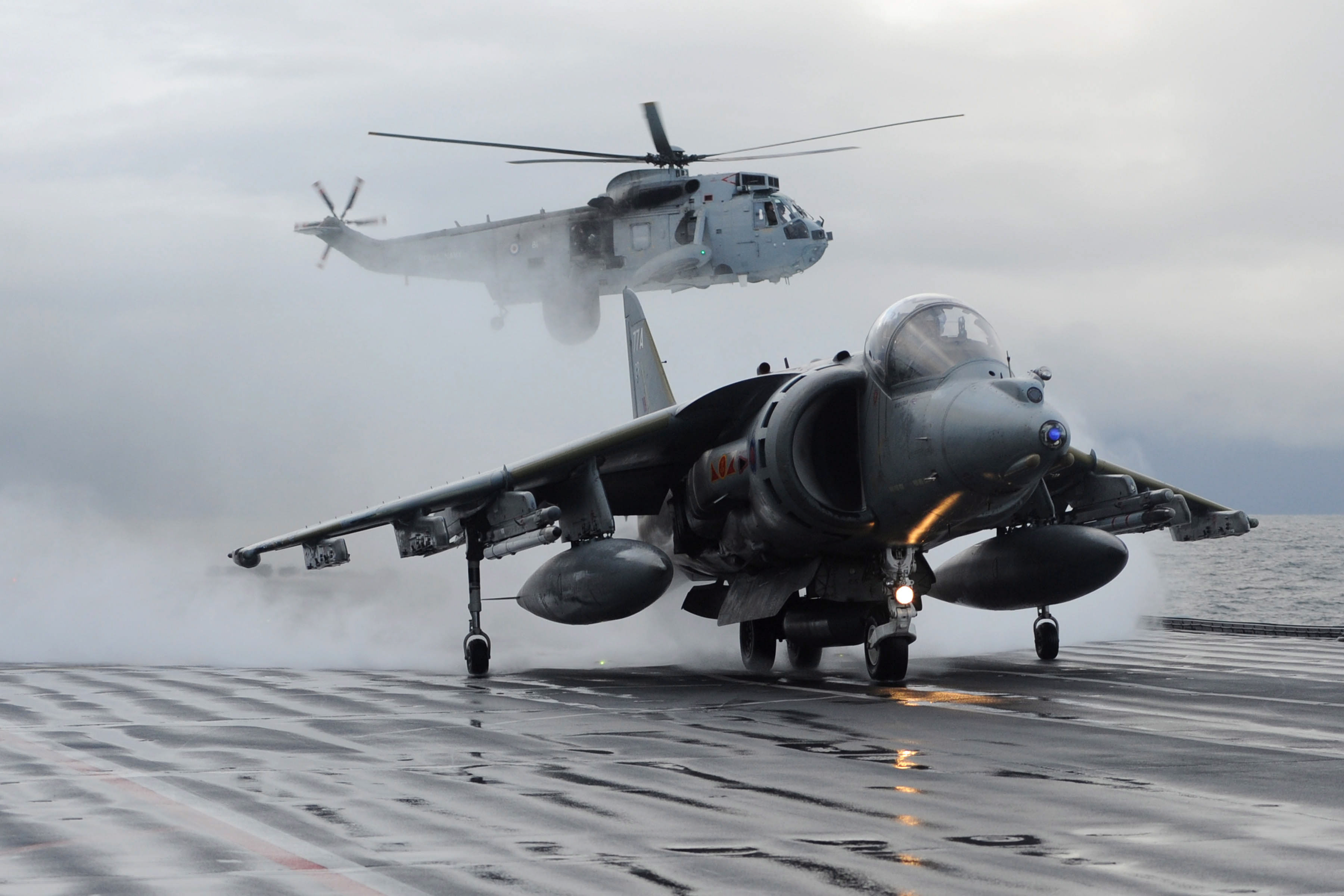
An 800 Squadron Harrier GR9 takes off from Ark Royal for the very last time

Embarking in HMS Illustrious in the Mediterranean for a preparatory phase merely ten days later, the squadron was deployed to Afghanistan in September as part of Operation Herrick under the 904 Expeditionary Air Wing. This deployment involved assuming control of aircraft and facilities from the RAF's No IV Squadron to deliver aerial support to ground troops involved in combat against the Taliban.

On 9 March 2007, the squadron combined with 801 Naval Air Squadron to form the Naval Strike Wing (NSW) as a part of Joint Force Harrier. On 1 April 2010, NSW reverted to the identity of 800 Naval Air Squadron.

The squadron disbanded, as a result of the 2010 Strategic Defence and Security Review and the subsequent withdrawal of Harrier fleet. 800 Naval Air Squadron was officially disbanded along with the other two units within Joint Force Harrier, 1(F) Squadron and 4(R) Squadron of the Royal Air Force, during a combined Royal Navy and Royal Air Force ceremony that took place at RAF Wittering on 28 January 2011. The last commanding officer was Commander David Lindsay.

== Aircraft flown ==
The squadron has flown a number of different aircraft types, including:

- Hawker Nimrod I fighter aircraft (May 1933 – January 1939)
- Hawker Nimrod II fighter aircraft (May 1933 – January 1939)
- Hawker Osprey fighter and reconnaissance aircraft (May 1933 – August 1939)
- Miles Magister trainer aircraft (December 1937 – September 1938)
- Gloster Gladiator fighter aircraft (October 1938 – February 1939)
- Blackburn Skua fighter-bomber (October 1938 – April 1941)
- Blackburn Roc fighter aircraft (May – November 1939)
- Fairey Fulmar Mk.I reconnaissance/fighter aircraft (April – November 1941)
- Fairey Fulmar Mk.II reconnaissance/fighter aircraft (June 1941 – July 1942)
- Hawker Sea Hurricane Mk IB fighter aircraft (June – October 1942)
- Hawker Sea Hurricane Mk IIB fighter aircraft (September – October 1942)
- Hawker Sea Hurricane Mk IIC fighter aircraft (October 1942 – November 1943)
- Grumman Hellcat F. Mk. I fighter aircraft (July 1943 – May 1945)
- Grumman Hellcat F. Mk. II fighter aircraft (October 1944 – November 1945)
- Supermarine Seafire F Mk.XV fighter aircraft (August 1946 – February 1947)
- Supermarine Seafire F Mk.XVII fighter aircraft (January 1947 – April 1949)
- Supermarine Seafire FR Mk.47 fighter aircraft (April 1949 – November 1950)
- Supermarine Attacker F.1 jet fighter (August 1951 – May 1952)
- Supermarine Attacker FB.1 jet fighter bomber (February 1952 – January 1953)
- Supermarine Attacker FB.2 jet fighter bomber (September 1952 – June 1954)
- Hawker Sea Hawk FB 3 jet fighter bomber (November 1954 – July 1955)
- Hawker Sea Hawk FGA 4 fighter/ground attack aircraft (June 1955 – April 1956)
- Hawker Sea Hawk FGA 6 fighter/ground attack aircraft (June 1955 – April 1956)
- Hawker Sea Hawk FGA 6 fighter/ground attack aircraft (May 1956 – March 1959)
- Supermarine Scimitar F.1 jet fighter (July 1959 – February 1964)
- Blackburn Buccaneer S.1 jet strike aircraft (March 1964 – November 1966)
- Blackburn Buccaneer S.2 jet strike aircraft (September 1966 – February 1972)
- British Aerospace Sea Harrier FRS.1 V/STOL fighter, reconnaissance and strike aircraft (March 1980 – April 1995)
- British Aerospace Sea Harrier F(A).2 V/STOL fighter and strike aircraft (March 1995 – March 2004)
- British Aerospace Harrier GR.7 V/STOL strike aircraft (March 2006 – March 2009)
- British Aerospace Harrier GR.7A V/STOL strike aircraft (March 2006 – March 2009)
- British Aerospace Harrier GR.9 V/STOL strike aircraft (March 2006 – December 2010)
- British Aerospace Harrier GR.9A V/STOL strike aircraft (March 2006 – December 2010)

== Battle honours ==
800 Naval Air Squadron has been awarded numerous battle honours, including eleven during World War II:

- Norway 1940–44
- Mediterranean 1940–41
- Spartivento 1940
- Malta Convoys 1941–42
- "Bismarck" 1941
- Diego Suarez 1942
- North Africa 1942
- Normandy 1944
- South France 1944
- Aegean 1944
- Burma 1945
- Malaya 1945
- East Indies 1945
- Korea 1950
- Falkland Islands 1982

== Assignments ==
800 Naval Air Squadron was assigned as needed to form part of a number of larger units:

- 7th Naval Fighter Wing (October 1943 – October 1944)
- 3rd Naval Fighter Wing (October 1944 – October 1945)

== Naval air stations ==
800 Naval Air Squadron was active at various Royal Navy naval air stations of the and Royal Air Force stations, both within the United Kingdom and internationally. Additionally, it has operated from Royal Navy fleet, light fleet and escort carriers, as well as other airbases located abroad.

=== World War Two air stations and aircraft carriers ===
List of air stations and aircraft carriers used by 800 Naval Air Squadron during World War two including dates:

1939

- HMS Ark Royal (11 January – 24 March 1939)
- Royal Naval Air Station Worthy Down (HMS Kestrel), Hampshire (24 March – 3 April 1939)
- HMS Ark Royal (3 April – 24 May 1939)
- Royal Naval Air Station Worthy Down (HMS Kestrel), Hampshire (24 May – 9 July 1939)
- Royal Naval Air Station Lympne (HMS Buzzard), Kent (9 – 29 July 1939)
- HMS Ark Royal (29 July – 27 August 1939)
- Royal Naval Air Station Hatston (HMS Sparrowhawk), Mainland, Orkney (27 – 31 August 1939)
- HMS Ark Royal (31 August – 27 September 1939)
- Royal Naval Air Station Worthy Down (HMS Kestrel), Hampshire, (27 September – 2 October 1939)
- HMS Ark Royal (2 October 1939 – 15 February 1940)

1940

- Royal Naval Air Station Hatston (HMS Sparrowhawk), Mainland, Orkney (15 February – 22 April 1940)
- HMS Ark Royal (22 April – 2 May 1940)
- Royal Naval Air Station Hatston (HMS Sparrowhawk), Mainland, Orkney (2 – 4 May 1940)
- HMS Ark Royal (4 – 25 May 1940)
- Royal Naval Air Station Hatston (HMS Sparrowhawk), Mainland, Orkney (25 – 31 May 1940)
- HMS Ark Royal (31 May – 14 June 1940)
- Royal Naval Air Station Hatston (HMS Sparrowhawk), Mainland, Orkney (14 – 17 June 1940)
- HMS Ark Royal (17 June – 25 August 1940)
- RN Air Section Gibraltar, Gibraltar (25 – 29 August 1940)
- HMS Ark Royal (29 August – 8 October 1940)
- Royal Naval Air Station Crail (HMS Jackdaw), Fife (8 – 27 October 1940)
- Royal Air Force Prestwick, South Ayrshire (27 – 31 October 1940)
- HMS Ark Royal (31 October 1940 – 17 January 1941)

1941

  - RN Air Section Gibraltar, Gibraltar (detachment, 17 January – 6 February 1941)
  - RN Air Section Gibraltar, Gibraltar, (detachment, 23–24 March 1941)
- HMS Furious (4 – 9 April 1941)
- Royal Naval Air Station Lee-on-Solent (HMS Daedalus), Hampshire (9 April – 2 May 1941)
  - Royal Naval Air Station Donibristle (HMS Merlin), Fife (2 – 19 May 1941; six Fulmars of 'Z' Flight)
- HMS Victorious (19 May – 21 June 1941)
- Royal Naval Air Station Lee-on-Solent (HMS Daedalus), Hampshire (21 – 30 June 1941)
- Royal Naval Air Station Yeovilton (HMS Heron), Somerset (30 June – 12 July 1941)
- Royal Naval Air Station Machrihanish (HMS Landrail), Argyll and Bute (12 – 21 July 1941)
- HMS Furious (21 July – 5 August 1941)
- Royal Naval Air Station Arbroath (HMS Condor), Angus (5 – 11 August 1941)
- Royal Naval Air Station Lee-on-Solent (HMS Daedalus), Hampshire (11 August – 19 September 1941)
- Royal Naval Air Station St Merryn (HMS Vulture), Cornwall (19 September – 14 October 1941)
- Royal Naval Air Station Machrihanish (HMS Landrail), Argyll and Bute (14 – 15 October 1941)
- HMS Indomitable (15 October – 10 November 1941)
- RN Air Section Norfolk, Virginia, United States (10 – 22 November 1941)
- HMS Indomitable (22 – 28 November 1941)
- Royal Naval Air Station Palisadoes (HMS Buzzard), Jamaica (28 November – 3 December 1941)
- HMS Indomitable (3 – 6 December 1941)
- Royal Naval Air Station Palisadoes (HMS Buzzard), Jamaica (6 – 12 December 1941)
- HMS Indomitable (12 December 1941 – 11 January 1942)

1942

- Royal Air Force Khormaksar, Aden (11 January – 16 March 1942)
- HMS Indomitable (16 March – 14 April 1942)
- RN Air Section Ratmalana, Ceylon (14 – 24 April 1942)
- HMS Indomitable (24 April – 22 May 1942)
- Royal Naval Air Station Tanga (HMS Kilele), Tanganyika (22 May – 8 July 1942)
- HMS Indomitable (8 July – 27 August 1942)
- Royal Naval Air Station Lee-on-Solent (HMS Daedalus), Hampshire (27 August – 23 September 1942)
- Royal Naval Air Station Hatston (HMS Sparrowhawk), Mainland, Orkney (23 September – 1 October 1942)
- Royal Naval Air Station Lee-on-Solent (HMS Daedalus), Hampshire (1 – 8 October 1942)
- Royal Naval Air Station Hatston (HMS Sparrowhawk), Mainland, Orkney (8 – 9 October 1942)
- HMS Biter (9 October – 19 November 1942)
- Royal Naval Air Station Machrihanish (HMS Landrail), Argyll and Bute (19 November 1942 – 1 January 1943)

1943

- Royal Naval Air Station Grimsetter (HMS Robin), Mainland, Orkney (1 – 13 January 1943)
- Royal Naval Air Station Machrihanish (HMS Landrail), Argyll and Bute (13 – 14 January 1943)
- Royal Naval Air Station Grimsetter (HMS Robin), Mainland, Orkney (14 January – 12 March 1943)
- Royal Naval Air Station Donibristle (HMS Merlin), Fife (12 – 24 March 1943)
- HMS Unicorn (24 March – 16 April 1943)
- Royal Naval Air Station Donibristle (HMS Merlin), Fife, (16 – 30 April 1943)
- Royal Naval Air Station Hatston (HMS Sparrowhawk), Mainland, Orkney (30 April – 8 May 1943)
- Royal Naval Air Station Donibristle (HMS Merlin), Fife (8 May – 3 June 1943)
- Royal Naval Air Station Eglinton (HMS Gannet), County Londonderry (3 June – 28 October 1943)
- HMS Ravager (deck landing practice, 28 October – 4 November 1943)
- Royal Naval Air Station Eglinton (HMS Gannet), County Londonderry (4 November – 5 December 1943)
- HMS Emperor (5 – 11 December 1943)
- Royal Naval Air Station Eglinton (HMS Gannet), County Londonderry (11 December 1943 – 25 January 1944)

1944

- RN Air Section Norfolk, Virginia, United States (25 January – 5 February 1944)
- HMS Emperor (5 February – 2 March 1944)
- Royal Naval Air Station Eglinton (HMS Gannet), County Londonderry (2 – 6 March 1944)
- HMS Emperor (6 March – 6 April 1944)
- Royal Naval Air Station Hatston (HMS Sparrowhawk), Mainland, Orkney (6 – 11 April 1944)
- HMS Emperor (11 – 28 April 1944)
- Royal Naval Air Station Hatston (HMS Sparrowhawk), Mainland, Orkney (28 April – 6 May 1944)
- HMS Emperor (6 May – 5 June 1944)
- Royal Naval Air Station Belfast (HMS Gadwall), County Antrim, Northern Ireland (5 – 7 June 1944)
- HMS Emperor (7 – 19 June 1944)
- Royal Naval Air Station Ayr (HMS Wagtail), South Ayrshire (19 – 28 June 1944)
- Royal Naval Air Station Ballyhalbert (HMS Corncrake), County Down (28 June – 9 July 1944)
- HMS Emperor (9 July – 25 July 1944)
  - RN Air Section Takali, Malta (detachment, 25 July – 6 August 1944)
- Royal Naval Air Station Dekheila (HMS Grebe), Alexandria, Egypt (2 – 14 September 1944)
- HMS Emperor (14 September – 29 November 1944)
- Royal Air Force Long Kesh, County Down (29 November 1944 – 23 February 1945)

1945

- Royal Naval Air Station Belfast (HMS Gadwall), County Antrim, Northern Ireland (23 – 25 February 1945)
- HMS Emperor (25 February – 25 March 1945)
- Royal Naval Air Station Colombo Racecourse (HMS Bambara), Ceylon (25 March – 21 April 1945)
- HMS Emperor (21 April – 23 May 1945)
  - HMS Shah (detachment of eight aircraft, 11–19 May 1945)
  - HMS Khedive (detachment of three aircraft, 11–19 May 1945)
- RN Air Section Cochin, India (23 May – 9 June 1945)
- HMS Emperor (9 – 11 June 1945)
- Royal Naval Air Station Colombo (HMS Bambara), Ceylon (11 – 18 June 1945)
- HMS Emperor (18 June – 19 July 1945)
  - HMS Shah (detachment of eight aircraft, from 24 June 1945)
- Royal Naval Air Station Katukurunda (HMS Ukussa), Ceylon (19 July – 7 August 1945)
- HMS Emperor (7 – 15 August 1945)
- Royal Naval Air Station Trincomalee (HMS Bambara), Ceylon (15 August – 18 September 1945)
- Royal Naval Air Station Coimbatore (HMS Garuda), India (18 September – 3 October 1945)
- Royal Naval Air Station Trincomalee (HMS Bambara), Ceylon (3 October – 5 November 1945)
- HMS Emperor (aircrew, from 5 November 1945)
- Disbanded in the United Kingdom

== Commanding officers ==
List of commanding officers of 800 Naval Air Squadron:

1933 – 1945

- Lieutenant Commander C.J.N. Atkinson, RN, (Squadron leader RAF), from 2 May 1933
- Lieutenant Commander J.B. Heath, RN, (Squadron Leader RAF), from 1 August 1935 (Commander 31 December 1936)
- Lieutenant Commander H.A. Traill, RN, (Squadron Leader RAF), from 17 March 1937
- Lieutenant Commander B.H.M. Kendall, RN (Squadron Leader RAF), from 18 July 1938
- Lieutenant Commander G.N. Torry, RN, (Flight lieutenant RAF), from 21 November 1938
- Captain R.T. Partridge, RM, from 3 April 1940
- Lieutenant E.G.D. Finch-Noyes, RN, from 28 April 1940
- Captain R.T. Partridge, RM, from 23 May 1940 (PoW 13 June 1940)
- Lieutenant R.M. Smeeton, RN, from 16 June 1940
- Lieutenant Commander J.A.D. Wroughton, DSC, RN, from 12 May 1941
- Lieutenant Commander J.M. Bruen, RN, from 16 March 1942
- Lieutenant H. Muir-Mackenzie, DSC, RN, from 1 December 1942
- Lieutenant Commander S.J. Hall, DSC, RN, from 7 July 1943
- Lieutenant Commander(A) S.G. Orr, DSC & Bar, RNVR, from 15 June 1944
- Lieutenant Commander S.J. Hall, DSC, RN, from 14 July 1944
- Lieutenant Commander M.F. Fell, DSO, RN, from 24 September 1944
- Lieutenant Commander(A) D.B. Law, DSC, RNVR, from 12 December 1944
- Lieutenant Commander H. de Wit, RNIN, from 20 May 1945
- disbanded – 5 December 1945

1946 – 1950

- Lieutenant Commander(A) D.G. Parker, DSO, DSC, RN, from 15 August 1946
- Lieutenant Commander M. Hordern, DSC, RN, from 6 February 1946
- Lieutenant Commander J.F. Rankin, DSC, RN, from 16 March 1948
- Lieutenant Commander R. Pridham-Wippell, RN, from 14 May 1948
- Lieutenant D.M. Steer, RN, from 28 October 1949
- Lieutenant Commander I.M. MacLachlan, RN, from 8 December 1949 (DoWS 29 August 1950)
- Lieutenant Commander T.D. Handley, RN, from 29 August 1950
- disbanded – 10 November 1950

1951 – 1954

- Lieutenant Commander G.C. Baldwin, DSC and Bar, RN, from 22 August 1951
- Lieutenant Commander W. Kearsley, RN, from 3 December 1952
- Lieutenant Commander W.I. Campbell, RN, from 23 December 1953
- disbanded – 11 June 1954

1954 – 1956

- Lieutenant Commander R.D. Lygo, RN, from 8 November 1954
- disbanded – 4 April 1956

1956 – 1959

- Lieutenant Commander J.D. Russell, RN, from 7 May 1956
- Lieutenant Commander N. Perrett, RN, from 1 November 1957
- Lieutenant Commander A.A. Fyfe, RN, from 1 December 1958
- disbanded – 3 March 1959

1959 – 1964

- Lieutenant Commander D.P. Norman, AFC, RN, from 1 July 1959
- Lieutenant Commander A. Mancais, RN, from 2 October 1961
- Lieutenant Commander P.G. Newman, RN, from 25 March 1963
- Lieutenant Commander D.F. Mills, RN, from 15 April 1963
- disbanded – 25 February 1964

1964 – 1972

- Lieutenant Commander J.C. Mather, RN, from 18 March 1964
- Lieutenant Commander C.C. Giles, RN, from 26 October 1965
- Lieutenant Commander J.W. Moore, RN, from 1 November 1966
- Lieutenant Commander S.D. Mather, RN, from 1 August 1968
- Lieutenant Commander J.O.F.D. Billingham, RN, from 11 December 1969
- Lieutenant Commander R. Wren, RN, from 15 January 1971
- disbanded – 23 February 1972

1980 – 2004

- Lieutenant Commander T.J.H. Gedge, RN, from 31 March 1980
- Lieutenant Commander A.D. Auld, DSC, RN, from 20 January 1982
- Lieutenant Commander D. Hamilton, RN, from 13 September 1983
- Lieutenant Commander R. Frederikson, RN, from 5 May 1985
- Lieutenant Commander M.W. Watson, RN, from 12 January 1988
- Lieutenant Commander R.C. Hawkins, RN, from 6 January 1990
- Lieutenant Commander D.D. Braithwaite, RN, from 20 August 1991
- Lieutenant Commander C.B. Neave, RN, from 23 April 1993
- Lieutenant Commander J.P. Millward, MBE, RN, from 4 November 1994
- Lieutenant Commander D.T. Baddams, MBE, RN, from 26 August 1997
- Lieutenant Commander T.C. Eastaugh, RN, from 13 September 1999
- Commander R.C. Payne, RN, from 20 October 2001
- Commander P.C.J. Stone, RN, from 19 November 2002
- disbanded – 31 March 2004

2006 – 2011

- Commander A.P. Orchard, RN, from 31 March 2006
- Commander K.W. Seymour, RN, from 6 June 2007
- Commander D.J. Lindsay, RN, from 29 April 2009
- disbanded – 28 January 2011

Note: Abbreviation (A) signifies Air Branch of the RN or RNVR.

== See also ==
- David Morgan (Royal Navy officer) – most successful British pilot in air combat during the Falklands War
- Falklands War order of battle: British naval forces
- Naval organization of the U.S.-led coalition during the Gulf War
- Attack on Mers-el-Kébir - 1940 British naval attack on the French Navy
- Royal Navy and Fleet Air Arm aerobatic teams
