= BL755 =

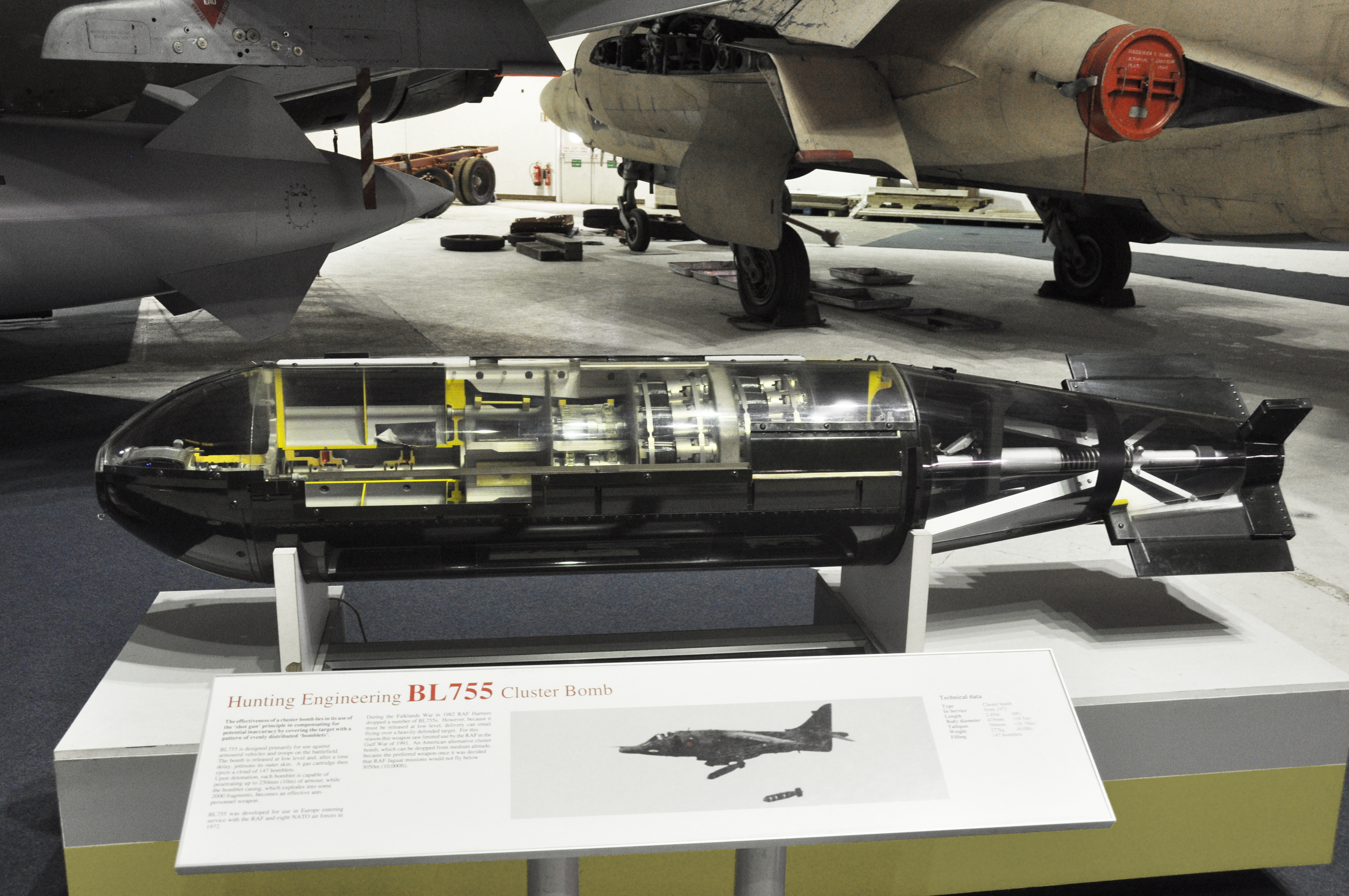
- Type: Anti-armour cluster bomb
- Place of origin: United Kingdom

Service history
- Used by: Royal Air Force, Royal Navy
- Wars: Falklands War, 1991 Gulf War, Croatian War of Independence, Bosnian War, Yemeni civil war

Production history
- Designer: Hunting Engineering, Ltd.
- Manufacturer: Hunting Engineering, Ltd.
- Produced: since 1972
- No. built: As of 1 January 1996, 60,598 bombs and 8,925,906 submunitions
- Variants: BL755, IBL755, RBL755

Specifications
- Mass: 264 kg (582 lb)
- Length: 2,451 mm (8 ft 0.5 in)
- Diameter: 419 mm (16.5 in)

BL755 is a cluster bomb developed by Hunting Aircraft that contains 147 parachute-retarded high explosive anti-tank (HEAT) submunitions. Its primary targets are armoured vehicles and tanks with secondary soft target (anti personnel) capabilities. It entered service with the Royal Air Force (RAF) in 1973.

BL755 was developed as a new-generation anti-tank weapon that would allow extremely low-level attacks against Soviet armoured formations. The introduction of the ZSU-23-4 Shilka self-propelled anti-aircraft gun rendered the pop-up attack profile demanded by iron bombs and air-to-ground rockets almost suicidal. The cluster munition would be dropped in pairs while the aircraft overflew the formation at 450 knots (830 km/h; 520 mph) and 300 feet altitude, covering an area of 1,000 by 500 feet (300 m × 150 m).

The weapon's first use in combat was during the Falklands War where it was used in the anti-infantry role. When dropped from ultra-low altitudes, the bomblets proved to have a very high failure rate because the parachutes often did not deploy in time. A new version was ordered for the Gulf War that added a radar altimeter allowing release from medium altitudes and then opening at the proper altitude.

As part of the 2007 Convention on Cluster Munitions negotiations, the RAF agreed to remove the BL755 from its inventory by 2008. Its role has been replaced by the CRV7, an air-to-ground rocket with such improved performance that it is effective even in the face of the ZSU.

== History ==
=== Previous systems ===
For many years the standard RAF anti-armour weapon was the "60lb" RP-3, the Second World War-era air-to-ground rocket used by British aircraft such as the Hawker Typhoons of the Second Tactical Air Force. These were still being widely used in the 1960s, especially during the Aden Emergency in battles between Yemen and Radforce in what was then the Aden Protectorate where Hawker Hunters fired a total of 2,508 RP-3 over 642 sorties. With the British withdrawal in November 1967, the Hunters moved to Bahrain and the RP-3 was retired after decades of service.

The RP-3 was replaced by the 68mm (2.7 inch) SNEB, a version of the seminal post-war rocket design, the US Folding-Fin Aerial Rocket (FFAR). These rockets were fired from a streamlined pod made by Matra (giving it the alternative name) rather than individual rails, which greatly reduced drag and dramatically increased the number of rockets that could be carried. While a Hunter might carry eight RP-3s, it typically carried two M115 18-rocket pods for a total of 36 SNEBs. The SNEB was also more accurate; the RP-3 had an average dispersion around 2.3 degrees, while the larger snap-out fins of the SNEB reduced this to just over 1 degree. However, the smaller rocket motor did result in slightly lower velocity and longer flight times, although the effective range was slightly longer.

The SNEB appears to have been used in combat only once, when they were mounted on some British Army Aérospatiale Gazelle helicopters during the Falklands War in 1982. Records suggest none were actually fired. The SNEB was also cleared for carriage by many other aircraft used in the conflict, but due to the possibility that shipboard radars might fire the electrical ignitors while in the magazines, most used an older Royal Navy 2-inch (51 mm) rocket design instead.

=== SR(A)1197 ===
In the early 1970s the Ministry of Defence was startled by reports of the effectiveness of the ZSU-23-4 Shilka which first entered service in 1965 and had replaced all earlier systems in Soviet use by the early 1970s. Using older weapons like the 1000 lb GP bomb (Note: nominal weight – approx 450 kg) or the SNEB against tanks required the aircraft to fly low and then "pop up" during the final approach to about 700 feet (210 m) altitude and then fly directly at the target. In the case of the SNEB this required a dive at around 10 degrees and firing at a range of about 1,500 yards (1,400 m). This was right within the engagement envelope of the Shilka. Furthermore, a total of 20 aircraft would be needed to guarantee the armour formation would be broken up, meaning the Shilka would have many chances to attack. This led to serious concerns about the survivability of the RAF in the anti-armour role. As it was later stated:

The effectiveness of modern air defence systems in the field is such that the use of dive bombing or rocket attacks is likely to involve an unacceptable casualty rate.

This led to the issuing of Staff Requirement SR(A)1197 for a new weapon capable of being delivered from very low altitudes, about 300 feet (91 m), while overflying the target area without the need to pop up.

=== BL755 ===
Hunting Aircraft won the contract with what became BL755. The 600 lb (270 kg) weapon looked like a conventional bomb, but contained 147 sub-munitions arranged in seven rows of 21 each behind frangible covers. After release from the aircraft, the "bomb" was popped open using an inflatable bag that drove the munitions outward, breaking the covers and scattering the bombs. The sub-munitions consisted of a small high explosive anti-tank warhead with a stabilizing "coronet" that flipped out on ejection to ensure they were facing forward when they impacted. The trigger was mounted on a spring that extended after launch to ensure the bomb fired at the right range from the armour.

The weapon reached its initial in-service version with the No. 1 Mk. 4 design of 1973, with carriage on the Hawker Siddeley Harrier GR.3, SEPECAT Jaguar GR.1, Blackburn Buccaneer S.2. and F-4 Phantom. Some indication of its effectiveness compared to the SNEB is that calculations suggested nine aircraft each dropping two BL755s would have the same effect as 20 aircraft firing 36 SNEB each.

=== IBL755 ===
It was precisely at this time that the Soviets began introducing the T-72 tank into service, which had enough armour to defeat the BL755 if it hit the frontal arc of the tank. In response, Hunting modified the design to replace the coronet with a small parachute contained in a basket at the back of the sub-munitions. This slowed the weapon so that it normally hit the tank from the top where it had no problems penetrating the armour. This No. 2 Mk. 1 version, also known as IBL755, remained effective against Soviet armour for the rest of the BL755's history.

=== RBL755 ===
BL755 had its first major use during the Falklands War, where it was extensively used by Harrier aircraft. It was found that when the Safety, Arming and Functioning Unit (SAFU) was set to its lowest altitude setting, the parachutes did not have time to fully deploy and the bomblets often struck the ground at an angle that meant their trigger was not set off.

When the RAF began preparing for the Gulf War in 1991, they decided that all weapons would be released from medium altitudes, which the BL755 was not really suited to given the SAFU was designed for a range of altitudes from low to ultra-low. This led to an Urgent Operational Requirement and the modification of those remaining BL755's with No. 1 Mk. 4 with the addition of a Motorola radar altimeter to produce the RBL755 – the R for 'radar'. The incorporation of the altimeter meant the weapon always released the sub-munitions at the right time to ensure they had the right trajectory to trigger, which also had the side-effect of eliminating any pre-setting on the part of the pilot.

=== Replacement ===
As part of the international Convention on Cluster Munitions carried out in Oslo in 2007, the UK agreed to remove the BL755 from service. Its replacement was the CRV7, another rocket developed from the FFAR, but one with a new solid-propellant rocket of dramatically improved performance. Whereas the RP-3 and SNEB had an effective firing range on the order of 1,500 yards (1,400 m), the CRV7 is effective to about 20,000 feet (6,100 m) and flies at about three times the speed of these earlier weapons. This allows the launching aircraft to fire whilst still outside the range of weapons like the Shilka.

== Design ==
The BL755 looks like a standard 450-kilogram (1,000 lb) general-purpose bomb but with a hard "saddle" on the spine for ejector release and crutching pad loads and a distinctive large turbine-like air arming vane on the nose. The four rear fins are squared off in appearance, but on closer inspection can be seen to be hollow and telescopic. A central extruded aluminium skeleton is divided into seven bays, each containing 21 submunitions (147 total). The bays are covered by a frangible cover that the submunitions break during ejection. The submunitions are ejected by a central gas cartridge and individual inflatable bladders for each bay, operating in a similar manner to a car airbag. Ejection on the original BL755 bomb is triggered by the rotation of the arming vane, driven by the airflow.

Each submunition is contained within its own SAFU (safety and arming unit) and is telescoped shut. Upon release, the submunition is expanded by a spring. A focal distance standoff and detonating device deploys at the front and a fan of stabilizing fins at the rear. Each has a shaped charge HEAT warhead for armour penetration, the casing of which is constructed from wound tessellated square wire, which produces around 1,400 anti-personnel fragments. A single cluster bomb produces a total of more than two hundred thousand fragments.

== Deployment ==
The bomb is cleared for use by the Panavia Tornado aircraft in the British Royal Air Force.

=== United Kingdom ===
The BL755 was used in combat by the Royal Navy and the RAF during the Falklands War and the RAF during the invasion of Iraq (Operation Telic) and Bosnian War. During the first Gulf War a small number were deployed by RAF Jaguars.

=== Yugoslavia ===
On the night of 27 October 1991, a Yugoslavian Soko J-22 Orao mistakenly dropped two BL755 Mk.3 bombs on the outskirts of Barcs, a small city in southernmost part of Hungary, causing extensive material damage, but no casualties. The incident led to an emergency upgrade of the Hungarian Air Force, which obtained 28 new MiG-29B fighter jets in exchange for a write-off of ex-Soviet state debt. The Hungarian government also invited NATO's Boeing E-3 Sentry AWACS planes to patrol over the Lake Balaton area, keeping a constant radar eye on the Balkan civil war theatre.

=== Zimbabwe ===
The Air Force of Zimbabwe's BAE Hawks were armed with BL755s, which were used against the Rwandan, Ugandan and Congolese rebel forces during the early stages of the Second Congo War, in support of Congolese leader Laurent Kabila.

=== Iran ===
The Islamic Republic of Iran Air Force heavily used BL755 cluster bombs on Iraqi troop and armour concentrations during the Iran–Iraq War. They were carried by the F-5E, F-5F, F-4D and F-4E Phantoms.

=== Saudi Arabia/UAE ===
Both Saudi Arabia and the United Arab Emirates have used the BL755 cluster bomb in the Saudi Arabian-led intervention in Yemen and ongoing Yemeni Civil War.

== Operators ==
- Germany
  - German Air Force: Slowly being phased out without replacement. Use restricted to territorial self-defense.
- India
  - Indian Air Force: Currently used by Jaguars.
- Pakistan
  - Pakistan Air Force
- Serbia
  - Serbian Air Force: Used by J-22's.
- Saudi Arabia
  - Royal Saudi Air Force: Used by British-made Panavia Tornado aircraft.
- United Arab Emirates
  - United Arab Emirates Air Force

== Former operators ==
- Belgium
  - Belgian Air Component: The entire stock has been put out of service and destroyed.
- Canada
  - Canadian Armed Forces The entire stock has been put out of service and destroyed by 2014.
- Netherlands
  - Royal Netherlands Air Force: The entire stock has been put out of service and destroyed.
- United Kingdom
  - Royal Air Force: Withdrawn from service in 2007/2008 after the signing of the Convention on Cluster Munitions (CCM).
