= Mullet Creek =

Small river in East Falkland, United Kingdom

Coordinates: 51.72129°S 57.89498°W

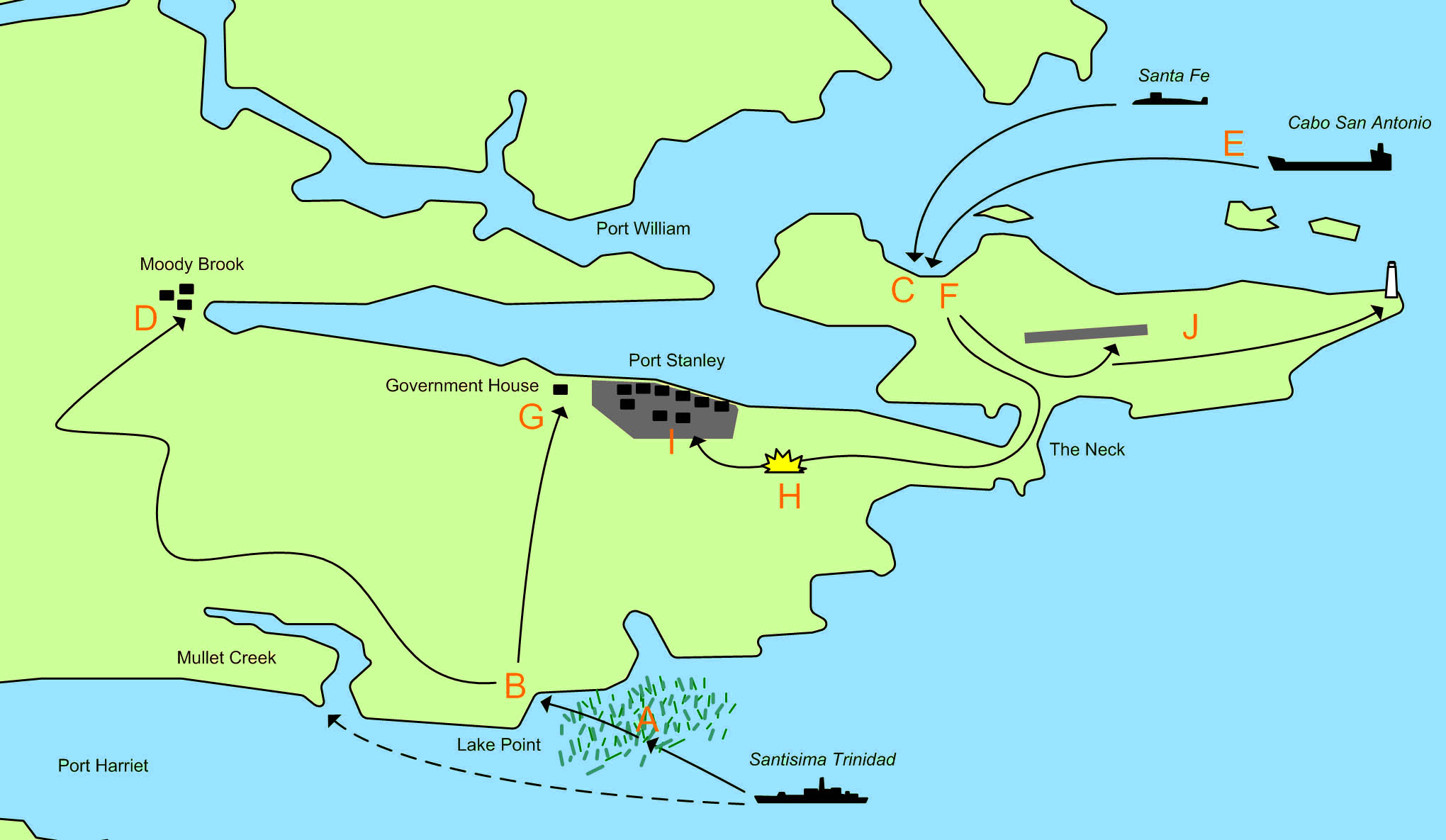
- Map of the 1982 Argentine invasion, showing Mullet Creek

Location
- Country: United Kingdom
- Region: East Falkland, Falkland Islands

Physical characteristics
- Source: Mullet Creek Stream
- Mouth: Port Harriet
- Length: 3 m (9.8 ft)
- Basin size: 12 km2

Mullet Creek is a small river in East Falkland. It is not a major watercourse, but is best known for its part in the Falklands War During the last hours of April 1, 1982, Argentinian marines led by Guillermo Sanchez-Sabarots, landed his squadron of special forces at Mullet Creek, and advanced on Stanley. By 08.30 the battle was over and the Governor had ordered his ten Royal Marines (Navy Party 8901) to surrender. The Royal Marines, the Governor and any others who wished it were shipped out to Britain.

== Falklands War ==
The Argentine operation codenamed Azul (blue), began in the late evening of Thursday 1 April 1982 when the Argentine destroyer ARA Santisima Trinidad halted 500 metres off Mullet Creek and lowered 21 Gemini assault craft into the water. They contained 84 special forces troopers of Lieutenant-Commander Guillermo Sanchez-Sabarots' 1st Amphibious Commandos Group and a small party under Lieutenant-Commander Pedro Giachino, who was normally 2IC (second-in-command) of the 1st Marine Infantry Battalion, that was to capture Government House.

== Geography ==
Mullet Creek Stream rises between Two Sisters Mountain and Mount Tumbledown, and flows for 3 miles (4.8 km) towards Mullet Creek, an inlet that leads into Port Harriet. The streams drains an area of around 12 square kilometres (4.5 mi^{2}). The watercourse flows through Pony's Pass Quarry, and although the worked out quarry areas have been considered for use as a landfill, the possibility of leachate from the landfill polluting the stream led to the idea being mothballed. Where the Mullet Creek empties out in Port Harriet was considered to be a suitable location for new port facilities on East Falkland; however, the preferred site at Stanley harbour was chosen. Where the stream crosses the main Stanley to Darwin road west of Pony's Pass Quarry, Mullet Creek is 7 miles (11 km) west of Stanley and 27 miles (43 km) east of Mount Pleasant.

== History ==
In March 1942, a Supermarine Walrus that was used for patrolling the islands at dawn and dusk crashed and overturned in Mullet Creek. The land around Mullet Creek was primarily used for farming; the statistics for 1977-1987 show the owners of the farm there had over 1,400 sheep. The land around Mullet Creek was heavily mined by the Argentines during the Falklands War. The minefields at Mullet Creek were de-mined in 2012 and 2013 which released some of the shoreline around Mullet Creek and a stone corral into accessible land.
