= List of weapons of the Argentine Navy =

== Infantry ==
=== Handguns ===
Model	Image	Caliber	Origin	Details
Browning Hi-Power		9×19mm Parabellum	Belgium; Argentina	Standard service pistol. Manufactured by Fabricaciones Militares.
Heckler & Koch P7		9×19mm Parabellum	Germany	Used by Tactical Divers Group.

=== Submachine guns ===
Model	Image	Caliber	Origin	Details
Steyr MPi 69		9×19mm Parabellum	Austria	Used by Tactical Divers Group.
FN P90		FN 5.7×28mm	Belgium	Used by Tactical Divers Group.
Heckler & Koch MP5		9×19mm Parabellum	Germany	Used by Tactical Divers Group and Amphibious Commandos Group.

=== Battle/Assault rifles ===
Model	Image	Caliber	Origin	Details
M16A2		5.56×45mm NATO	United States	Primary service rifle.
FN FAL		7.62×51mm NATO	Belgium; Argentina	Secondary service rifle. Manufactured by Fabricaciones Militares.
IWI ARAD		5.56×45mm NATO	Israel	New service assault rifle.
M4A1		5.56×45mm NATO	United States	Used by Amphibious Commandos Group.
FAMAS		5.56×45mm NATO	France	Used by Amphibious Commandos Group.
Steyr AUG		5.56×45mm NATO	Austria	Used by Tactical Divers Group.

=== Machine guns ===
Model	Image	Caliber	Origin	Details
M249 SAW		5.56×45mm NATO	United States	Standard issue light machine gun.
FN MAG		7.62×51mm NATO	Belgium; Argentina	Standard issue general-purpose machine gun. Manufactured by Fabricaciones Militares.
Heckler & Koch HK21		7.62×51mm NATO	Germany	Used by Amphibious Commandos Group.
Browning M2		.50 BMG	United States	Standard issue heavy machine gun.

=== Sniper rifles ===
Model	Image	Caliber	Origin	Details
Steyr SSG 69		7.62×51mm NATO	Austria	Standard issue sniper rifle.
M24 SWS		7.62×51mm NATO	United States	Used by Tactical Divers Group and Amphibious Commandos Group.
Barrett M95		.50 BMG	United States	Used by Amphibious Commandos Group.

=== Anti-armor weapons ===
Model	Image	Caliber	Origin	Details
M72 LAW		66 mm	United States	Former standard issue portable AT weapon. In reserve.
AT4		84 mm	Sweden	Standard issue portable AT weapon.

=== Grenade launchers ===
Model	Image	Caliber	Origin	Details
M203		40 mm	United States	Standard issue underbarrel grenade launcher. In use with M16A2 and M4A1.
Mk 19		40 mm	United States	Standard automatic grenade launcher.

== Artillery and Air-defense systems ==
Model	Image	Quantity	Origin	Details
OTO Melara Mod 56		24	Italy	105 mm howitzer.
M101		4	United States	105 mm howitzer.
M114A1		6	United States	155 mm howitzer.
ECIA L65		30	Spain	81 mm mortar.
Bofors 40 mm		4	Sweden	40mm anti-air autocannon.
RBS 70 NG		6	Sweden	Man-portable air-defense system
Flycatcher (radar)		2	Netherlands	Fire control system of the anti-air autocannons.

== Vehicles ==
Model	Image	Quantity	Origin	Details
Assault Amphibious Vehicle		11	United States	Amphibious vehicle.
LARC-V		13	France	Amphibious vehicle.
Panhard VCR		31	France	Armored personnel carrier.
ERC 90 Sagaie		12	France	Armored car.
Humvee		70	United States	Light utility vehicle.
Agrale Marruá		31	Brazil	Light utility vehicle.
M35		Unknown	United States	6x6 Cargo truck
Mercedes-Benz Atego		Unknown	Germany	4x4 Cargo truck
