= History of Mar del Plata =

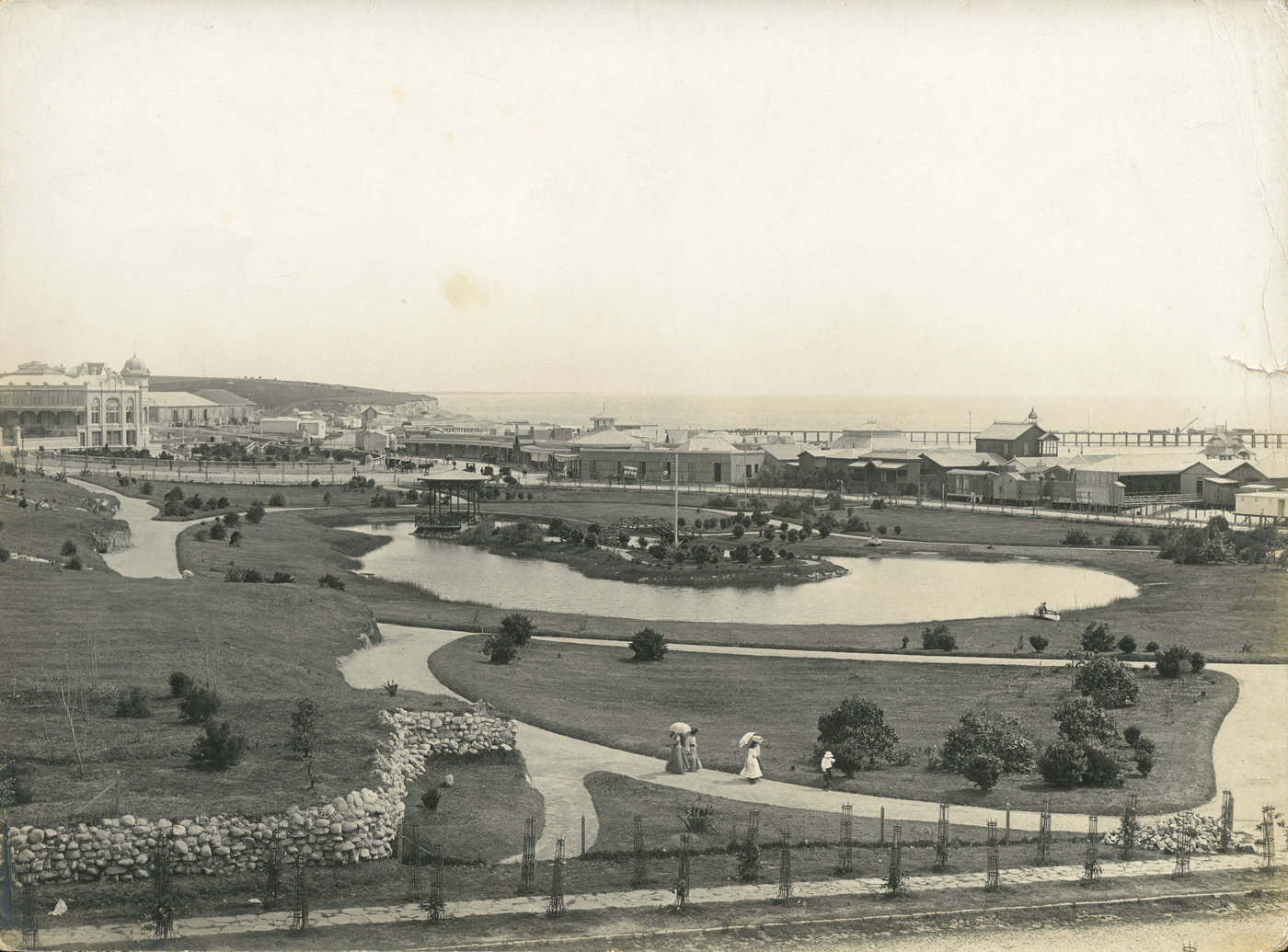
Paseo General Paz, February 1904

In February 1519, during the first circumnavigation of Earth, the expedition led by Ferdinand Magellan, a Portuguese explorer in the service of Spain, is thought to have discovered the beaches of Punta Mogotes, five miles south of what is today downtown Mar del Plata, naming them Punta de Arenas Gordas. Sir Francis Drake, in his 1577 circumnavigation voyage, was the first navigator to visit the beaches and cliffs of Cabo Corrientes and describe it. He introduced the name Cape Lobos in the cartography of his time, due to the large colony of sea lions (lobos de mar in Spanish) around the cape Just four years later, the Spanish Governor of the River Plate, Don Juan de Garay (second founder of Buenos Aires) explored the area area by land, and paid tribute to the beautiful landscape by describing it as a muy galana costa (a very elegant shore). This is today one of the city's favourite mottos.

In 1742, during the War of Jenkins' Ear, eight survivors of HMS Wager, part of Admiral Anson's expedition, lived through a ten-month ordeal before being decimated and captured by the nomadic tribe of the Tehuelches, who eventually handed them to the Spaniards.

In 1746, by order of the Spanish Kingdom, a Jesuit Order's mission was established on the northwestern shore of what is now Laguna de los Padres, some 8 miles (13 km) west of the modern city, but it was abandoned after a series of northern Tehuelches attacks, led by native chieftain Cangapol. On 15 November 1770 a punitive expedition departing from Luján and led by Captain Juan Antonio Hernández, with the help of friendly natives, defeated a group of Tehuelches who had been harassing and plundering a number of farms and hamlets beyond the Salado River. The battle took place at the Vulcan Heights, near Sierra de los Padres, where 102 Tehuelches were ambushed and killed. In 1772 another Spanish expedition commanded by Captain Pedro Pablo Pabón surveyed the area. The region was not populated again by Europeans until 1856, when a meat-salting facility was built by Portuguese entrepreneur Coelho de Meirelles, and a stable population settled there.

== Foundation and development (1874–1930) ==
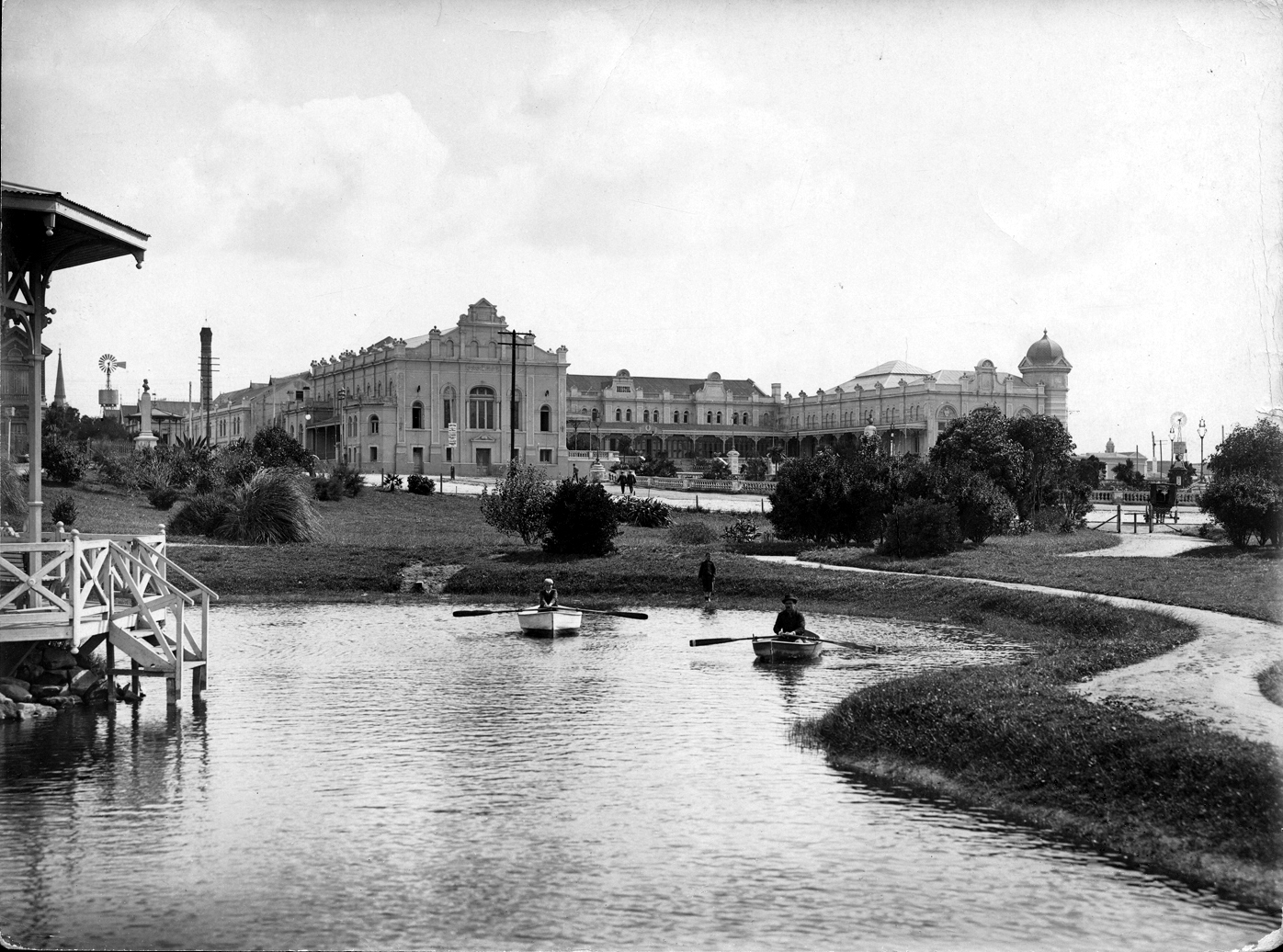
Bristol Hotel, 1907

The town was founded on February 10, 1874 by governmental decree, and by initiative of Patricio Peralta Ramos. It is said that Pedro Luro, a Basque merchant, had the idea of turning the growing town into a European-style bathing resort three years later. As the railway began to expand into the province, previously isolated settlements became accessible to visitors from the capital; the first passenger train arrived here from Buenos Aires in September 1886. The subsequent opening of the town's first hotel - the luxurious Bristol Hotel- in 1888 was a great occasion for the Buenos Aires elite, many of whom travelled down for the opening on an overnight train.

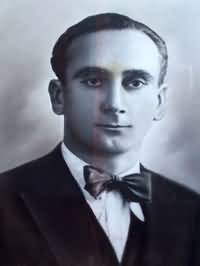
Teodoro Bronzini, first Socialist Mayor of Mar del Plata, elected in 1919

The railroad also paved the way to the arrival of European immigrants, mainly Italians, Spaniards and French. Among the Italians, Sicilians and Calabrians started the first fishing activities in the 1890s, although the port of Mar del Plata would only be built in 1916 by a French company. The project was designed and directed by the local engineer Federico Beltrami, son of a Swiss-Italian immigrant, Francesco Beltrami, himself the first recorded builder in the town. Mar del Plata's initial success aside, the richest of Argentina's very rich continued to make their regular pilgrimages to Europe. It took the outbreak of war in Europe to dampen Argentine enthusiasm for the journey across the Atlantic and to establish the town as an exclusive tourist destination. Indeed, the building industry also began in this period, in order to satisfy the demands of the new resort. The different guilds were led mostly by residents originally from Northern Italy, but the next generation included people of Spaniard and Southern Italian stock.

In the late 1920s wealthy Argentine families began to build chalets and mansions near Bristol Hotel, and spent their days at the Playa Bristol beach. They would live in Mar del Plata from November until Easter.

This social background increased the tensions between the elite and the established population. The political intervention of the central power, held by the Conservative Party, in the Municipality's institutions prompted a 1911 Manifiesto from some residents seeking to diminish the national oligarchy influence over local affairs. The following moves brought the Socialists to power in 1919 (see Government in the main article about Mar del Plata), an audacious shift in the summer residence of the Argentine aristocracy. The national Government was also taken over by the Radical Civic Union, its leader, Hipólito Yrigoyen becoming President of the Republic.

== Mass tourism (1930–1970) ==
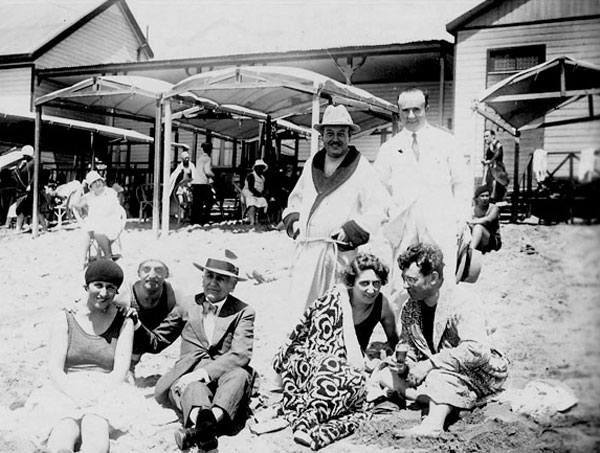
Tourists at the beach, c. 1930

The first military coup in Argentina's history took place on September 6, 1930, restoring the conservative hegemony in all levels of Government, including the local one. Although unpopular and fraudulent, this old new order brought some progress and investment to an ailing country in the climax of the Great Depression. Mass tourism began to arrive in this decade, helped by improved roads, but it took off in the 1940s and 1950s, when the development of union-run hotels under the Perón presidency put the city within the reach of Argentina's middle and working classes. Peronism, even if elected by overwhelming popular vote, kept some of the Conservative hegemonic practices. This was especially noted in Mar del Plata, where the internal disputes inside the party led to a succession of Comisionados; de facto Mayors imposed by the provincial Governor. None of the Peronist Mayors elected by vote completed his term in office in this nine-year period. On the other hand, the social changes promoted by Perón boosted Mar del Plata's economy and middle class as never before.

Workers of Mar del Plata during a march for the Saturday half-day holiday

But allegations of populism, corruption and mismanagement reached the point of no return. The Revolución Libertadora, a combined military and civilian uprising, overthrew Perón on September 16, 1955. In Mar del Plata, as in other places of the country, the Navy supported the rebels and the Army remained loyal to the Government. The naval base outskirts and some points of the city were subjected to heavy shelling from the sea, before the loyalist forces could be dispersed. The action was carried out by the cruiser ARA Nueve de Julio, a squadron of destroyers and the corvette ARA Republica (former HMS Smilax), the latter inside the port itself. Two fishing boats (Miguel Angel and Corsario) evacuated non-essential personnel from the base, the latter running aground in the process.

If the 1950s were years of economic boom for Mar del Plata, the 1960s saw a skyrocketing development of the building industry, which reached the peak of its activity. The rate of construction per square feet was among the highests in the world, surpassing even that of São Paulo, Brazil. Like in the 1930s, the growth took place during a period of political turmoil. Peronism was proscribed by the military, but there were some constitutional intervals, all of them dominated by the Socialists at local level. It was certainly one of the most successful decades in Mar del Plata's history.

=== The last U-boats and other World War II stories ===
On July 10, 1945, two months after V-E day, a fishing boat leaving the port of Mar del Plata was surprised by coming upon a rusty German submarine. This U-boat, U-530, departed from Kristiansand, Norway, on March 3, with a complement of 54 men, under the command of 24-year-old Otto Vermouth. After a failed attack on an Allied convoy off New York City, the boat received a clear message ordering the surrender at the nearest Allied base. The situation looked suspicious to the confused Vermouth, who just a couple of hours before had heard on the wireless station the codename Regenbogen (rainbow), imparted by Admiral Karl Dönitz, which ordered the immediate scuttling of all operational U-boats. Facing these conflicting reports, he decided instead to continue on a southern course, finally reaching the Argentine coast during the early days of July. Unlike the usual procedures of the German military, the decision was taken by consensus. Before entering port to surrender to the Argentine authorities Vermouth threw overboard the codes and code machines, and discarded the 88 mm deck gun and torpedoes. The boat had been launched in 1941 and in 1943 had sunk the freighter Milos and the tanker Sunoil, and torpedoed and damaged the oiler Chapultepec. The crew was immediately interned by presidential decree and taken by bus to Buenos Aires.

On August 17 the German submarine U-977 (commander Heinz Schaeffer) was surprised on the surface, off the naval port, by the minesweeper ARA Py and the submarine ARA Salta. U-977 was boarded and towed to the military docks. Unlike Vermouth, Schaeffer released his U-boat intact, giving up to the Naval Authorities codebooks, code machines, guns and torpedoes, as a goodwill gesture. U-977, launched in 1942, had been damaged on her maiden trip by collision and spent her days as a school ship in the Baltic. Schaeffer learned about the death of Adolf Hitler a few days after departing from Kiel. As with U-530, the crew were allowed to vote on their fate. The married personnel opted for return and landed in Norway; the other seamen decided to make the long and dangerous trip to Argentina. After sailing for more than 100 days, Schaeffer had the Argentine coast on sight. On August 22, U-977's 31-man complement was transported to the capital. There was speculation about the submarine carrying some of the Nazi regime's prominent figures, but according to Canadian historian Ronald C. Newton, this proved to be just a legend born largely before the surrender of any German unit in Argentina. Both commanders were interrogated about the landing of personnel before the surrender, with a young Argentine sailor of German ancestry acting as interpreter.

Analysis of U-530's fuel consumption and U-977's log left little room for the boats to have executed any suspicious activities before reaching Mar del Plata. The German sailors and the submarines were eventually turned over to the United States Navy.

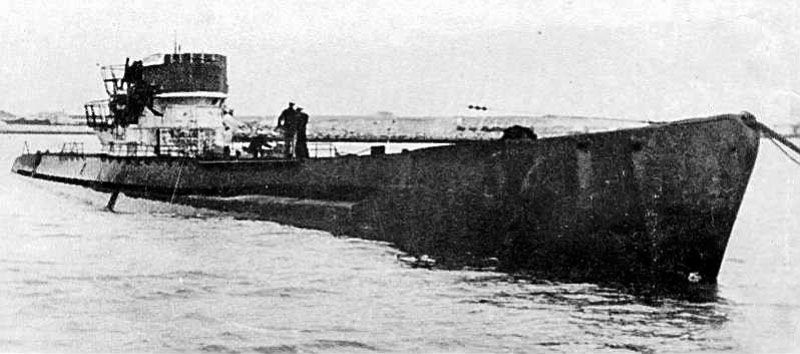
An Argentine Navy boarding party inspects U-530, July 1945

This episode was not the only World War II affair involving Mar del Plata. A less well-known German landing had taken place the year before: early on July 3, 1944 the yawl Santa Bárbara anchored a few yards off the coast near Punta Mogotes, then an area with extensive sand dunes, some 2 miles (3.2 km) southwest of the port. (Note: According to Allied sources, the Santa Bárbara met the support landing party at a point known today as "El Balcón del Sur" (38°06′24″S 57°34′12″W), a resort area southwest of Punta Mogotes lighthouse.) The vessel had been chartered by the Sicherheitsdienst (SD) with the mission of infiltrating two fully equipped spies in Argentina and to repatriate another three. The operation was a complete success, and the Allies only learned about Santa Bárbara several months later. The sailboat had departed from Arcachon, France, on April 16. The D-Day landings prevented the return to France, and the sloop delivered her passengers to Vigo, in neutral Spain. Another World War II related action was the interception of the German steamer Erlangen by the British cruiser HMS Newcastle 36 hours after sailing from Mar del Plata with a cargo of tungsten and molybdenum on July 23, 1941. The vessel was scuttled by her crew.

From a wide point of view, World War II was an opportunity for the port of Mar del Plata to increase its commercial activities and for its incipient fishing industry to export much-needed shark liver oil to Allied countries. During the war Mar del Plata, like all of Argentina, suffered from a severe shortage of materials such as fuel and metals.

== Crisis and recovery (1970–2000s) ==
The 1970s and 1980s showed some decline. Newer resorts became more and more attractive for so-called alternative tourism, and the high-profile visitors of the past shifted their attention to the beaches of Uruguay and Brazil. The success of each summer season hinged on the financial fluctuations of the currency, amid periods of inflation and crisis that discouraged the middle-class from investing in Mar del Plata. As a result of internal immigration from depressed regions of the country, the first villas miseria (shanty towns) made their appearance in these decades. By contrast, these years marked the taking-off for the fishing industry and the birth of metal-mechanics factories. The Nacional University was also founded in 1975. In 1978, the town hosted some matches for the football (soccer) FIFA World Cup 1978 organized by Argentina. The Stadium José Maria Minella was specially built for the occasion.

=== The Falklands War ===
Army and Navy groups based in the town participated in the Falklands War (Spanish: Guerra de las Malvinas/Guerra del Atlántico Sur) of 1982 with Britain.

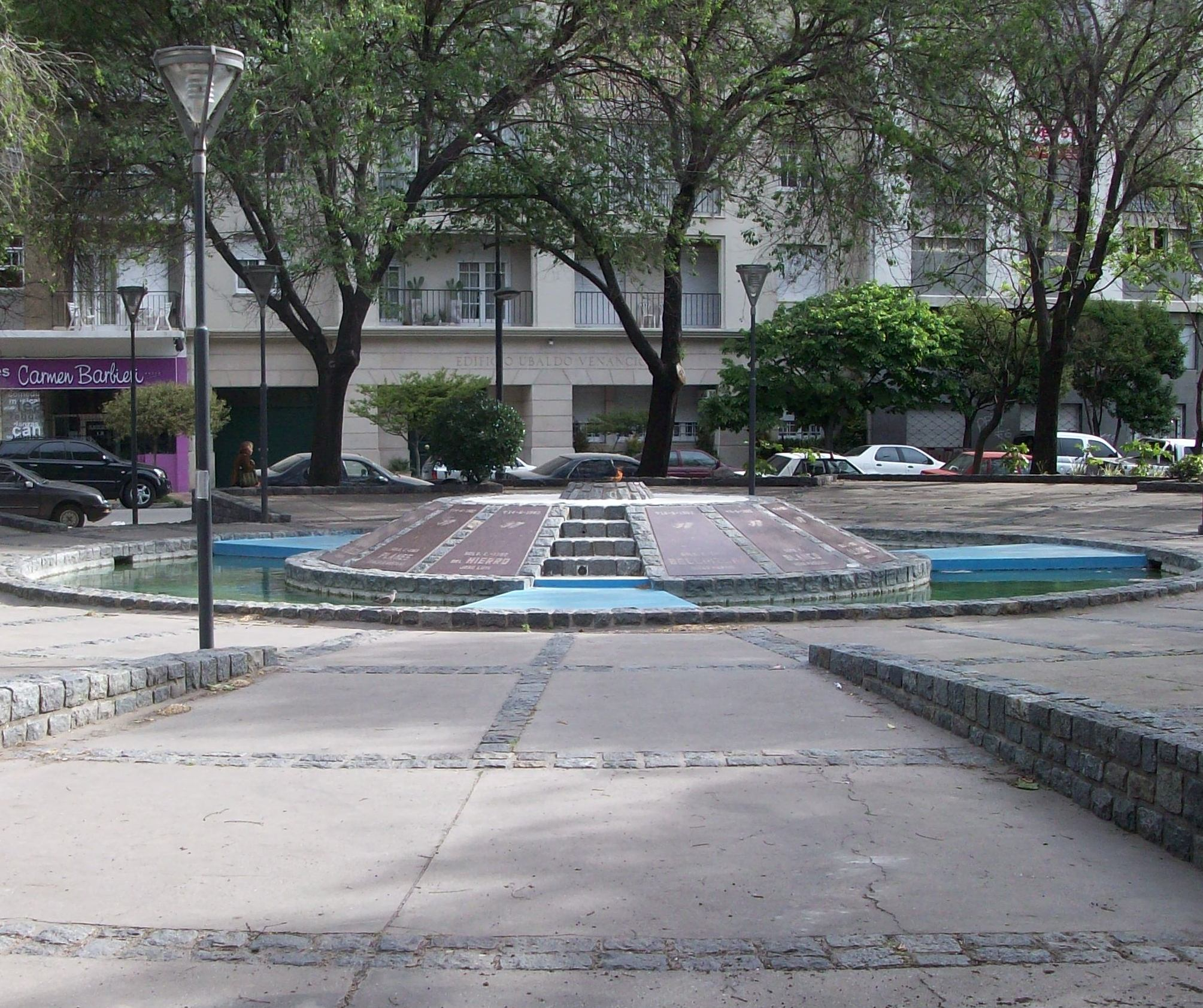
Malvinas-Falklands war memorial at Mar del Plata

Elite troops (Comandos Anfibios and Buzos Tacticos) from Mar del Plata's Naval Base forced the surrender of the Naval Party 8901 and the British Governor of the Islands, Rex Hunt, on April 2 that year (Operation Rosario).

The British reaction, Operation Corporate, prompted the build-up of an Argentine garrison in Stanley (renamed Puerto Argentino by the Argentine Government).

The Argentine submarines, also based at the naval docks, saw some action too; one of them, the old 'Guppy'-class ARA Santa Fe was lost in the South Georgia Islands. Another one, the Type 209 ARA San Luis harassed the British task force for several days.

The Antiaircraft Artillery Group 601 (GADA 601), its permanent headquarters located north of Mar del Plata, was responsible for the troops anti-aircraft defense. They claim the shootdown of four British aircraft (two Sea Harriers and two RAF GR.3 Harriers), forcing the British to change tactics in order to avoid the 35 mm Oerlikon Contraves guns and Roland missiles threat. The Sea Harriers ground-attack operations were conducted from high altitude from the rest of the conflict, and it was not until the arrival of the first GR3 Harriers that limited low level missions were launched, most of them in close air support role, or against high-value targets, like artillery and radars. The army's group was supported by an Argentine Air Force detachment, the Grupo 1 de Artillería Antiaérea (1st Group of Antiaircraft Artillery) which had been transferred from Tandil to Mar del Plata in October 1981. Both forces would operate together during the conflict in the defence of Stanley airport, renamed BAM Malvinas by the Argentines and Goose Green airstrip, designated BAM Cóndor (Cóndor Military Air Base). The Air Force group was reinforced with personnel from Río Gallegos.

A small detachment (34 men) from GADA 601, deployed in Port Darwin and armed with two twin Oerlikon 35 mm cannons, also played a key role in the Battle of Goose Green, May 28, inflicting several casualties to the 2nd Para battalion before surrendering the next day.

Thirteen personnel from Mar del Plata lost their lives in the conflict, among them the first Argentine casualty of the war, Captain Pedro Giachino, one of the commanders of the elite troops that seized Port Stanley. A memorial was erected to commemorate them in 1986.

=== Democratic process ===
The Socialists were replaced by the Radicals as the main political force in the 1983 election, after the Proceso de Reorganización Nacional, when a military dictatorship ruled the country. The city had been affected by both the leftist militant organizations' campaign and the brutal overreaction of the armed forces, resulting in 10–30,000 desaparecidos across the country, well over 200 of them in Mar del Plata alone. After the resigning of President Raúl Alfonsín amid a financial quagmire in 1989, the Peronists returned to power. President Carlos Menem made a huge reform of the Economy, established a parity between the Peso and the Dollar and sold all the obsolete companies belonging to the Federal Government. The first years of his mandate brought some prosperity to the Argentine middle-class, and there was a rebirth of mass tourism for Mar del Plata. But the trade deficit, along with an increasing jobless rate harmed the city's investments, with the subsequent social crisis. For the first time in its history, Mar del Plata saw emigration and some pockets of extreme poverty in the environs of the city. But even in such a deep crisis, the Radicals, identified with the mid-classes, kept firmly in charge of the local Government. The Peronism was succeeded by an Alliance between the Radicals and other moderate leftist parties in the central power in 1999.

However, after the unpopular administration of President Fernando De la Rua, and a period of riots and Institutional mess, the country had a swift recovery during the term of President Néstor Kirchner. The new situation was also felt in Mar del Plata. The local economy grew for the first time in years and the renewed touristic offer attracted investment, reviving the ailing market and consumers confidence. International events and conventions returned to the city, triggering the remodeling of public spaces. The Fourth Summit of the Americas is an example of the latter. The Summit took place on November 3 and November 6, 2005. The meeting of 34 countries in the Americas was marked by large-scale protests and a series of exchanges between Venezuelan President Hugo Chávez and the U.S. President George W. Bush centering on the proposed Free Trade Area of the Americas.

== See also ==
- History of Argentina
- Argentina during World War II
- Wager Mutiny

== Sources ==
Unless otherwise indicated, all the sources are written in Spanish.

- Anniversary Editions of La Capital newspaper: 1955, 1980, 1985, 2005.
- Barili, Roberto T. (1964) Mar del Plata, Reseña Histórica. Published by the Municipality of Gral. Pueyrredón, Mar del Plata,
- Gascón, Julio César (1942) Orígenes Históricos de Mar del Plata. Taller de Impressiones Oficiales, Provincia de Buenos Aires,
- Newton, Ronald C. (1992) The Nazi menace in Argentina (1937–1947). The Board of Trustees of the Leland Stanford Junior University. ISBN 0-8047-1929-2 (in English)
- Pastoriza, Elisa (1993) Los trabajadores de Mar del Plata en vísperas del peronismo. Biblioteca Política Argentina series, Buenos Aires.
- Ruiz Moreno, Isidoro (1997) La Neutralidad Argentina en la Segunda Guerra. Emecé Editores. ISBN 950-04-1762-6
- Sebreli, Juan José (1970) Mar del Plata: el ocio represivo. Editorial Tiempo Contemporáneo.
- Zago, Manrique (1997) Mar del Plata, Argentina. Manrique Zago Ed. (Bilingual Edition).
