= Spying on families of ARA San Juan =

Illegal spying on relatives of the ARA San Juan crew members

The spying on the family members of the sailors of the ARA San Juan was a series of events happened in Argentina that consisted in the illegal spying and monitoring of people who were relatives of the crew members who died due to the sinking of the Argentine Navy submarine on November 15, 2017, carried out by agents of the Federal Intelligence Agency (AFI). The facts have been considered a priori as a crime by the Argentine justice system, which proceeded to open the investigation under the direction of Judge Martín Bava of the city of Dolores, Argentina. High-ranking Argentine State authorities have been charged in the case, among them the then President Mauricio Macri, the former heads of the AFI Gustavo Arribas and Silvia Majdalani and the former head of the Mar del Plata Naval Base, from which the sunken submarine was based.

On November 15, 2017 the submarine ARA San Juan (S-42) of the Argentine Navy disappeared in the Atlantic Ocean, with 38 crew members and 6 tactical divers on board. After one year and two days the ship was found by a private company at a depth of 907 m (2,976 ft), with all its crew dead and very close to the point of disappearance, in a place that the Navy had already known about twenty days before. The sinking and post-disappearance searches were marred by suspicions, irregularities, negligence, late or contradictory reports, infighting, espionage and conflicts with the sailors' families, who demanded information, participation in the investigations and respect for the sailors killed in service.

On July 18, 2019, the Bicameral Commission for the Investigation of the Disappearance of the ARA San Juan Submarine presented its final report on the case. The report had the unanimity of the twelve legislators of the commission, except for the chapter referred to the responsibility, in which the opposition majority (seven legislators) and the pro-government minority (four deputies), prepared different reports. The majority opinion concluded that "there was a clear political and administrative responsibility" of the Mauricio Macri government, especially of the Minister of Defense Oscar Aguad and his closest officials, both in the operational and budgetary aspects, as well as in the concealment of information and the "neglect" of the family members. The minority opinion did not find fault under the responsibility of political officials.

In 2020, three hard drives were found in the offices of the Federal Intelligence Agency (AFI) with documentation referring to the spying and monitoring by agents of that agency on relatives of the victims of the ARA San Juan, carried out between December 2017 and the end of 2018. The AFI found no evidence that such operations had been legally authorized, which is why it reported the fact to the authorities at the end of September 2020.

The following facts are mentioned in the official documents that were found:

- A first report on relatives of the ARA San Juan, produced on December 28, 2017.
- Monitoring of the sister of one crewmember on January 15, 2018, at a mass at the Mar del Plata Naval Base.
- Infiltration of agents in a group of family members who presented a complaint to the Deliberating Council of General Pueyrredón.
- A report dated February 3, 2018 details the monitoring of four women who were partners of the submariners, to find out what would be their approaches in the meeting with then President Macri.
- On February 10, 2018, secret agents followed a mother and a group of family members who showed up at the presidential residence in Chapadmalal to drop off a letter to the president. On April 2, 2018, photographs were taken of a sister and a companion of a submariner who went to the Golf Club of Mar del Plata to talk to President Macri, and collected personal information about them on social media. On November 15, 2018, undercover AFI agents followed and photographed those who showed up at the Mar del Plata Naval Base on the one-year anniversary of the sinking.
- The official documents record at least ten other occasions on which follow-ups took place, detailed in 22 reports.

The criminal judicial investigation was conducted by Judge Martín Bava, head of Federal Court No. 2 of Azul, who is in charge of the vacant Federal Court of First Instance of Dolores, where the case is being handled.

On October 1, 2021, Judge Bava indicted (semi-full proof of guilt) the former heads of the AFI, Gustavo Arribas and Silvia Majdalani, the former director of the AFI's Internal Meeting, Eduardo Winkler, the former head of the Mar del Plata base, Nicolás Iuspa Benítez, and five AFI agents.
