= Tactical Divers Group =

Special operations force of the Argentine Navy

- Agrupación de Buzos Tácticos
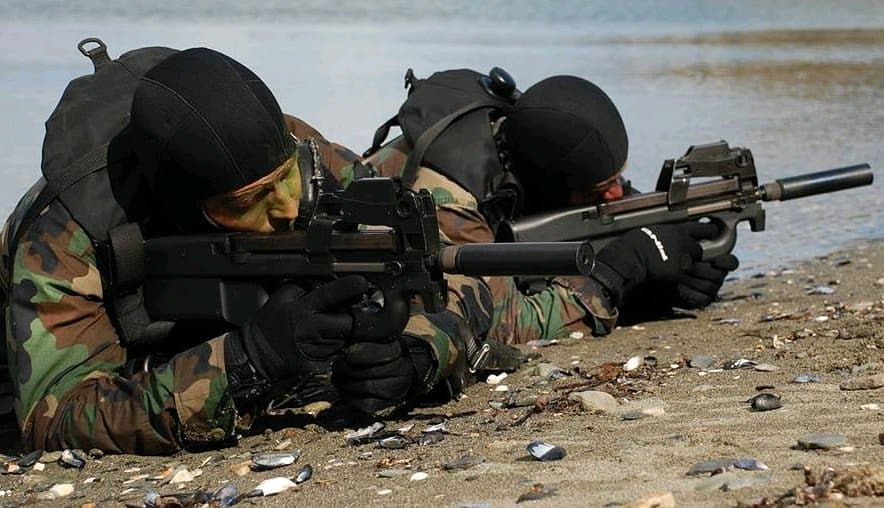
- Active: 1952–present
- Country: Argentina
- Branch: Argentine Navy
- Type: Combat divers Special Operations
- Size: Brigade
- Headquarters: Mar del Plata Naval Base
- Mottos: Dos cosas te pido señor, la Victoria y el regreso, pero si una sola has de concederme, que sea la Victoria.
- Engagements: Falklands War

Insignia
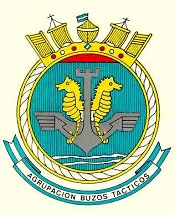
- Identification symbol

The Tactical Divers Group (Spanish: Agrupación de Buzos Tácticos, APBT) is the premier special operations force of the Argentine Navy. The Buzos Tácticos are based at Base Naval Mar del Plata (BNMP) on the Atlantic coast of Argentina. Its men are highly qualified combat divers, EOD/demolition technicians, and paratroopers.

== History ==
The APBT was the first special forces division created in South America. The unit was established in 1952 on board LST ARA Cabo San Bartolomé with instructors who were former X-MAS Italian diver commandos. In those times a reduced Tactical Divers Group was operating in the Cabo San Bartolomé; years later the Navy created a second group assigned to the Escuadra Naval del Plata. In 1966 both services were merged, creating the actual Tactical Divers Group.

In the 1982 invasion of the Falkland Islands, the main landing at Yorke Bay to the east of Port Stanley on 2 April, was preceded by an amphibious reconnaissance party of the APBT. They had been landed by the submarine ARA Santa Fe. They successfully secured the beach and the lighthouse, and set up beacons to guide the amphibious vehicles of the assault group, which had disembarked from the landing ship ARA Cabo San Antonio some distance offshore. Some sources assert that Buzos Tácticos units attacked the Moody Brook barracks and besieged Government House, however these troops were mainly units of the Amphibious Commandos Group (Agrupación de Comandos Anfibios, APCA). The error was due to hearsay reported by a journalist from the Argentinian magazine Somos, which was the first to publish an account of the operation, although a number of individual APBT members assisted the Commandos in both actions, specially around Government House. Both the APBT and the APCA teams had returned to Argentina by nightfall, on the same aircraft which had brought in the first Argentine Army reinforcements.

== Organization and training ==
The APBT is trained to operate in diverse environments, such as jungle/riverine, maritime and extreme cold weather. All members are top niche combat swimmers and divers. The APBT course takes place mostly in the Mar del Plata area. Topics include HALO/HAHO parachuting, airborne, unconventional warfare, underwater demolition, and counter-terrorism. The course is open to line officers and NCOs, and is very selective, with a high attrition rate. The members of this unit wear brown berets with unit badges.

The unit is attached to the Submarines Force Command, which comes under the Chief of Naval Operations. This unit is one of the two special operations forces' units of the Argentine Navy, the other being the Agrupación de Comandos Anfibios (APCA), under the Marine Infantry Command.

== See also ==
- Rapid Deployment Force
- Amphibious Commandos Group
