= Ushuaia Naval Base =

Argentine Navy base

- Ushuaia, Tierra del Fuego, Argentina
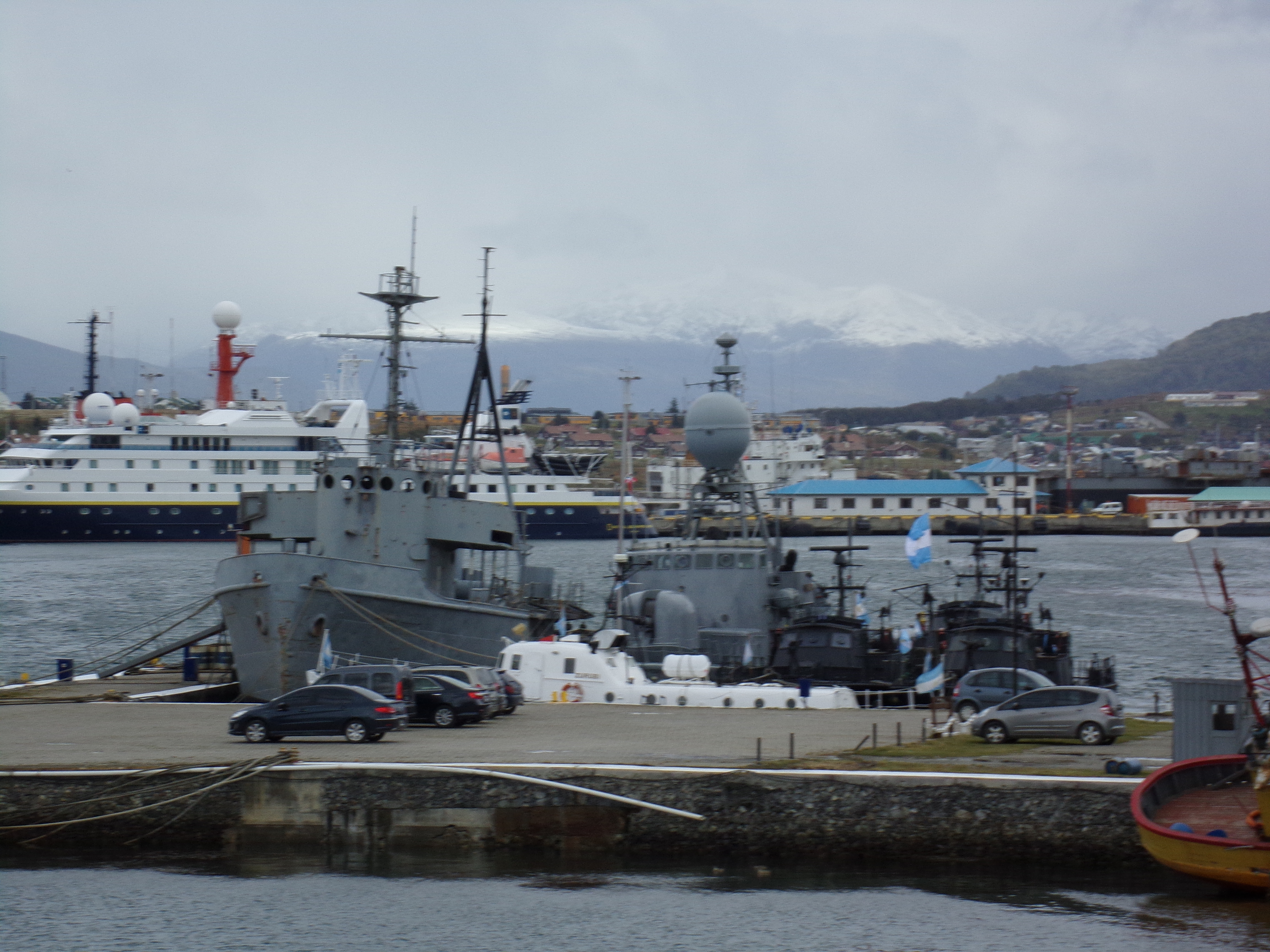
- An Abnaki-class tugboat (left) alongside in Ushuaia.

Site information
- Type: Naval base
- Operator: Argentine Navy
- Condition: Operational

Location
- Location in Argentina
- Coordinates: 54°48′10″S 68°17′50″W
- Area: 0 hectares (0 acres)

Site history
- Built: 1950
- In use: 1950 – present

The Ushuaia Naval Base or Admiral Berisso Integrated Naval Base is the southernmost port of the Argentine Navy, situated in Ushuaia on the shores of the Beagle Channel. It is also the main Argentine port and logistics center for access to Antarctica. It is named after Emilio Rodolfo Berisso, a naval officer assassinated in 1972 by the Revolutionary Armed Forces.

The base was founded on December 13, 1950, by then-President Juan Perón in order to establish a base of operations for support ships operating in the southern sector.

The deep draught of the port allows the operation of large ships. The base is used by Argentine Navy ships participating in each year's Antarctic Campaign for maintenance and resupply. Also included in its scope is the Ushuaia Naval Air Station (former airport), from where aircraft and helicopters of the Naval Aviation Command operate when they exercise in the Southern Atlantic.

The geographical area of its jurisdiction includes the province of Santa Cruz, the Big Island of Tierra del Fuego and the island of the States, and the southern maritime spaces that reach the 60º South parallel. The base jurisdiction also extends to the nearby Ushuaia Naval Naval Base, Rio Grande Naval Air Base and the Puerto Deseado Naval Base.

== Based units ==
=== Fast Patrol vessel ===
- ARA Indómita (P-86)

=== Patrol vessels ===
- ARA Baradero (P-61)
- ARA Barranqueras (P-62)
- ARA Clorinda (P-63)
- ARA Concepción del Uruguay (P-64)
- ARA Zurubí (P-55)

=== Tugboats ===
- ARA Toba (R-8)

== Future ==
As of 2021, President Alberto Fernandez announced plans to turn the Naval Base into an Antarctic Logistic Centre.

== See also ==
- Port Belgrano Naval Base
- Mar del Plata Naval Base
- Falklands Naval Station
