= Pony's Pass Quarry =

Quarry in the Falkland Islands

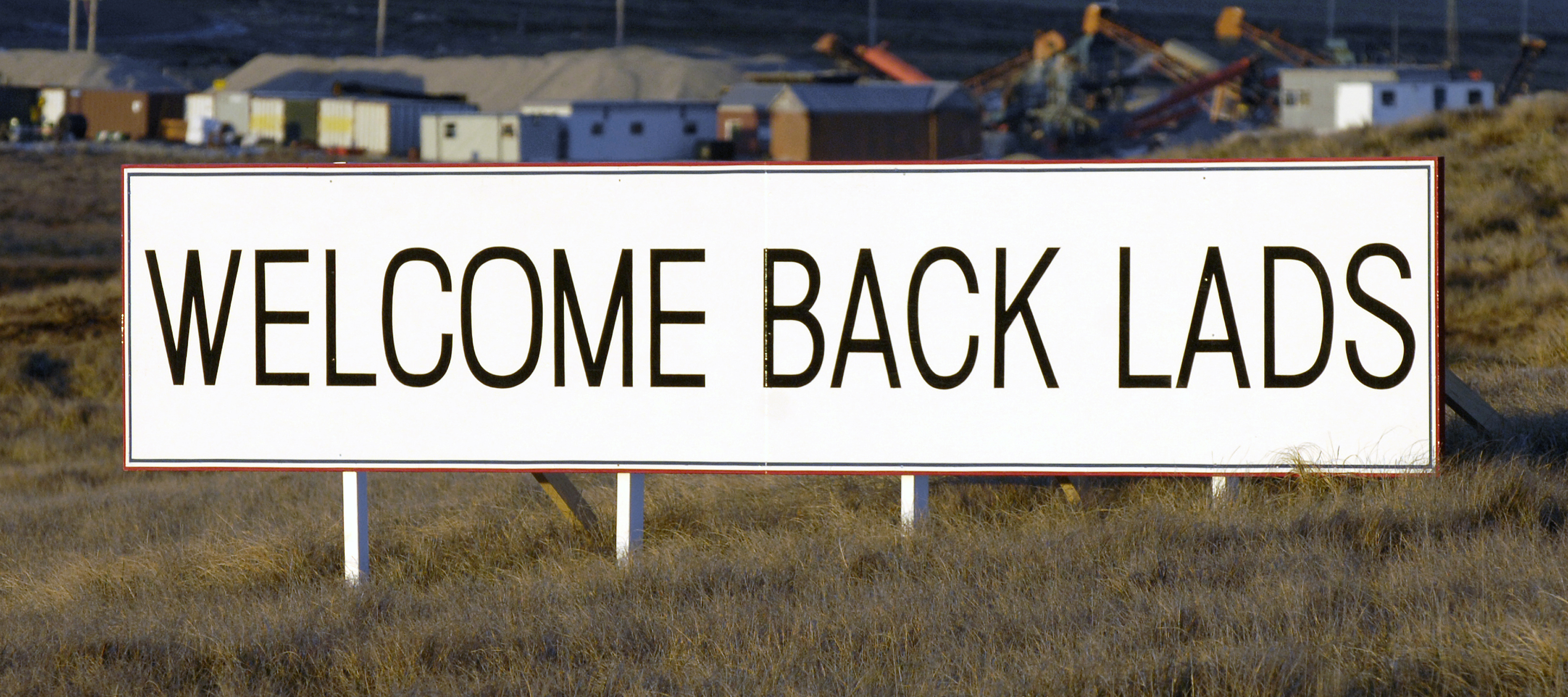
- Pony's Pass Quarry behind the Welcome Back sign
- Interactive map of Pony's Pass Quarry
- Location: Stanley, , Falkland Islands; 51.71776°S 57.96107°W
- Production: 160,000 tonnes (180,000 tons)
- Financial year: 2020

Pony's Pass Quarry is a stone quarry 6 miles (10 km) west of Stanley on East Falkland, on the Falkland Islands.

== History ==
The quarry lies 6 miles (9.7 km) west of Stanley on the road to Mount Pleasant and Darwin.

Whilst Pony's Pass is now the only active quarry in the Falkland Islands, several others existed such as Sapper Hill, Navy Point, Moody Hill and Mary Hill, all in the Stanley area, and the Tillite Quarry at Fitzroy, all produced stone at some point. Pony's Pass Quarry produces about 160,000 tonnes (180,000 tons) of quartzitic sandstone per year, but with a new crushing and screening plant installed in 2020, it can extend to 300,000 tonnes (330,000 tons) per year. The increased volumes are proposed due to the new port facility that is due to be built in Stanley Harbour in the late 2020s.

The stone produced at Pony's Pass is primarily for domestic use within the Falkland Islands as it is 300 miles (480 km) away from South America, however, a block of stone has been used as a commemorative marker at Poole in Dorset, England, to memorialise the Falklands War.

There have been proposals for a landfill on an unused part of the quarry site, and during mine clearances on the islands, stockpiles of mines which had been made safe were transported to the quarry and burnt.
