= 1982 invasion of the Falkland Islands =

Argentine invasion of the Falklands

Invasion of the Falkland Islands
- Part of the Falklands War
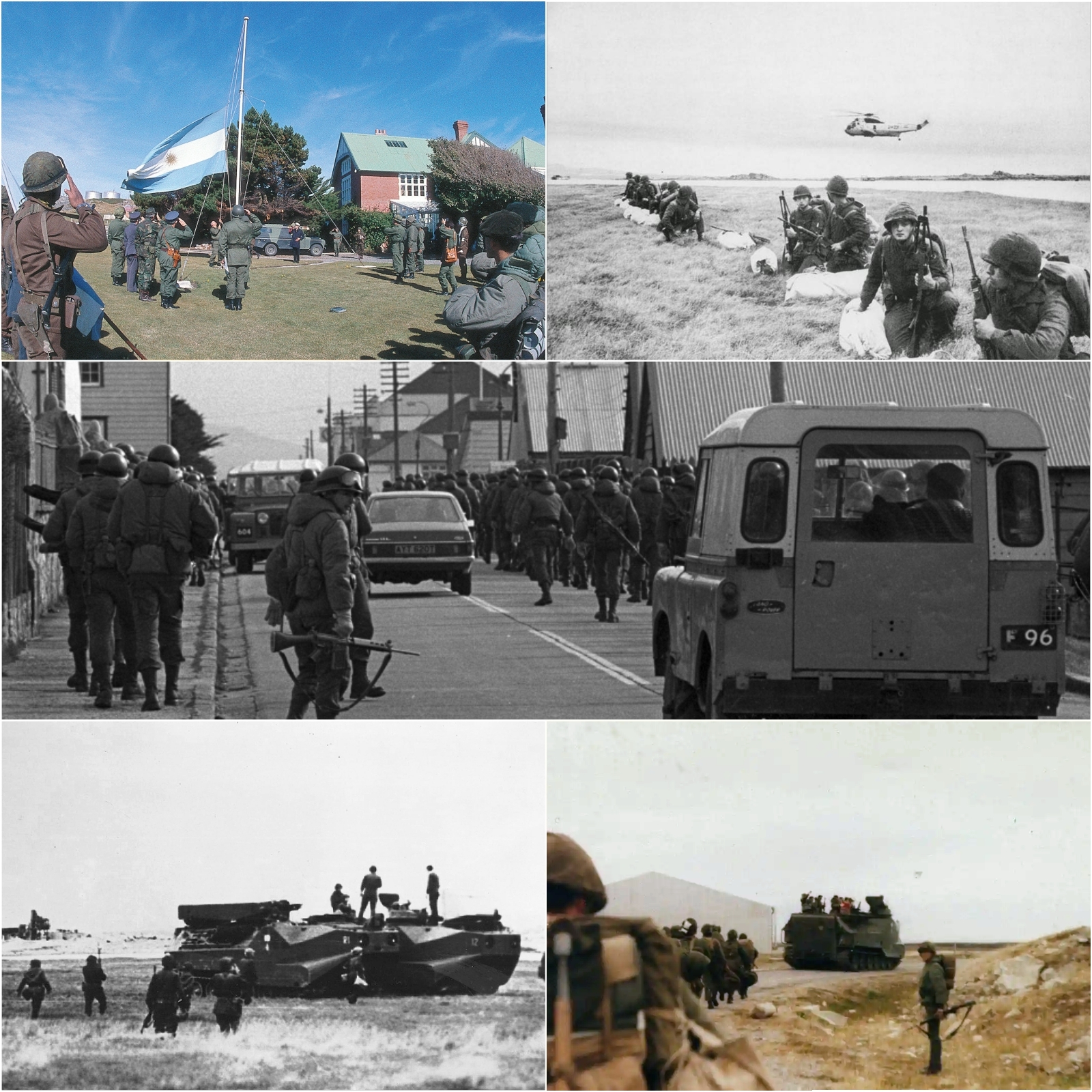
Date	2 April 1982
Location	Stanley, Falkland Islands 51°41′30″S 57°52′22″W
Result	Argentine victory
Territorial changes	Occupation of the Falkland Islands until June 1982: Start of the Falklands War

Belligerents
United Kingdom: Falkland Islands	Argentina

Commanders and leaders
(United Kingdom) Margaret Thatcher (Prime Minister); (Falkland Islands) Rex Hunt (surrendered) (POW); (United Kingdom) Mike Norman; (United Kingdom) Gary Noott; (Falkland Islands) Phil Summers	(Argentina) Leopoldo Galtieri (President); (Argentina) Carlos Büsser; (Argentina) Jorge Anaya; (Argentina) Pedro Giachino †; (Argentina) Mohamed Seineldin

Units involved
Royal Marines; Falkland Islands Defence Force	Argentine Army; Argentine Navy: Naval Infantry; Tactical Divers; Amphibious Commandos

Strength
57 Royal Marines; 11 armed sailors; 40 militia	550 Marines; 80 Tactical Frogmen; 20 AAV

Casualties and losses
107 captured	1 killed; 6 wounded

Argentine forces invaded the Falkland Islands on 2 April 1982 in a military operation code-named Operation Rosario (Operación Rosario). The invasion served as a catalyst for the subsequent Falklands War. The Argentines mounted amphibious landings and the invasion ended with the surrender of Falkland Government House, due to the location of the fighting the invasion is occasionally known as the Battle of Government House.

== Defence ==
Governor Rex Hunt was informed on 1 April 1982, by the British Government of a possible Argentine invasion. At 3:30 pm that day he received a telegram from the Foreign and Commonwealth Office stating:

We have apparently reliable evidence that an Argentine task force could be assembling off Stanley at dawn tomorrow. You will wish to make your dispositions accordingly.

=== Forces involved ===
The Governor summoned the two senior Royal Marines of Naval Party 8901 to Government House in Stanley to discuss the options for defending the Falklands. He said during the meeting, "Sounds like the buggers mean it."

Major Mike Norman was given overall command of the Marines due to his seniority, while Major Gary Noott became the military advisor to Governor Hunt. The total strength was 68 Marines and 11 sailors from the Antarctic patrol ship Endurance's survey team, commanded by RN Lieutenant Chris Todhunter. That number was greater than would normally have been available because the garrison was in the process of changing over—both the replacements and the troops preparing to leave were in the Falklands at the time of the invasion.

This was decreased to 57 when 22 Royal Marines embarked aboard HMS Endurance to join the 13-man British Antarctic Survey (BAS) team under base commander Steve Martin to observe Argentine soldiers on South Georgia. The Royal Navy and author Russell Phillips state that a total of 85 marines were present at Stanley.

Their numbers were reinforced by at least 25 Falkland Islands Defence Force (FIDF) members. Graham Bound, an islander who lived through the Argentine occupation, reports in his book Invasion 1982: Falkland Islanders at War that the higher figure of 40 members (including 15 ex-FIDF members) of the FIDF reported for duty at their drill hall. Their commanding officer, Major Phil Summers, tasked the volunteer militiamen (including his son Brian Summers) with guarding such key points as the telephone exchange, the radio station and the power station. Skipper Jack Sollis, on board the civilian coastal ship Forrest, operated his boat as an improvised radar screen station off Stanley. Four other civilians, former Royal Marines Jim Fairfield and Anthony Davies, a Canadian citizen, Bill Curtiss and Rex Hunt's chauffeur, Don Bonner also offered their services to the governor. Rex Hunt himself was armed with a Browning 9 mm pistol.

Before the main Argentine landings, nine of the British sailors present were placed under the command of the Chief Secretary, Dick Baker, and rounded up 30 Argentine nationals living in Port Stanley and placed them in protective custody next to the Police Station. He recalls:

There were a few local people to arrest, and I remember being terribly apologetic to them, and saying, 'Because you are Argentine or married to an Argentine, or work for LADE [an Argentinian airline], we have got to take you into custody.' We put them in the refreshment room of the Town Hall, which was near the Police Station.

The nine sailors came back to Government House, where they established an information service, leaving the prisoners in custody of RN Lieutenant Richard Ball.

== Operation Rosario ==
The Argentine amphibious operation began in the late evening of Thursday 1 April, when the destroyer ARA Santísima Trinidad disembarked special naval forces south of Stanley. The bulk of the Argentine force was to land some hours later from the amphibious warfare ship ARA Cabo San Antonio near the airport on a beach previously marked by frogmen from the submarine ARA Santa Fe. The operation had been called Azul (Blue) during the planning stage, but it was finally renamed Rosario.

=== ARA Santa Fe ===
Rosario began with the reconnaissance of Port William by the submarine ARA Santa Fe and the landing of 14 members of the Buzos Tácticos near Cape Pembroke, including the commander of this elite unit, Lieutenant-Commander Alfredo Raúl Cufré. The reconnaissance mission began as early as 31 March, when the trawler Forrest was spotted through the periscope at 10:00 p.m. off Port Stanley. The next day, Santa Fe learned that the authorities in Stanley were aware of the Argentine plans, so a change was necessary. Instead of landing right on Pembroke, the commandos would initially take a beach nearby.

The commandos left Santa Fe at 1:40 p.m. and from the beach headed towards Pembroke peninsula in Zodiac boats. They reached Yorke Bay at 4:30 a.m. on 2 April. After planting beacons for the main landing, they took over the airfield and the lighthouse without encountering significant resistance. After the British surrender at Port Stanley, this team was given the task of gathering the Royal Marines and taking them into custody.

=== Attack on Moody Brook barracks ===
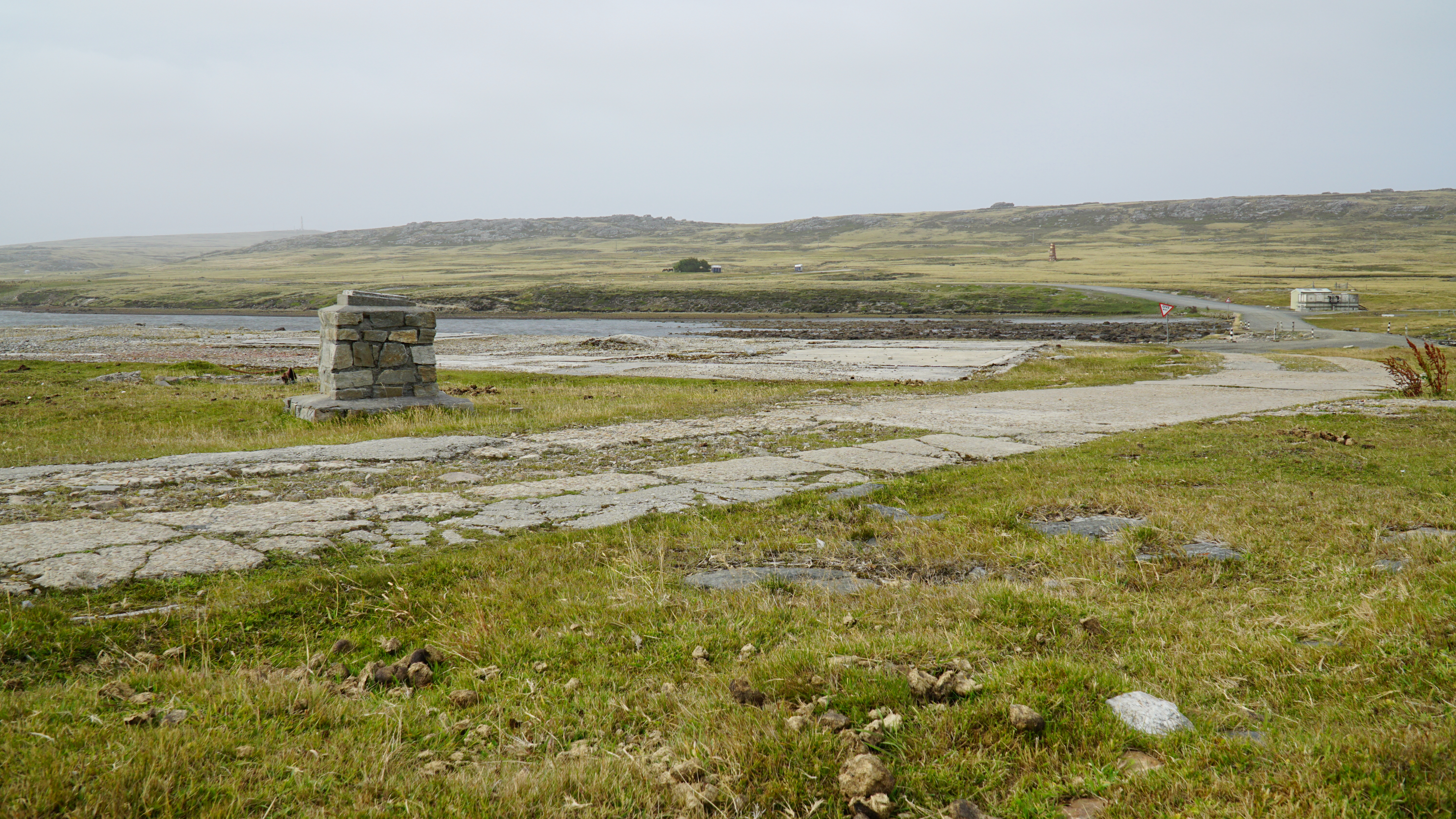
Site of Moody Brook Barracks, the island garrison for the Falklands. A small detachment of Royal Marines was stationed here from the 1960s until the invasion of 1982 when Argentine forces stormed the barracks. The site is that of the old wireless station. Only foundations remain today.

On the night of 1–2 April 1982, Santísima Trinidad halted 500 metres (1,600 ft) off the mouth of Mullet Creek, on the northern bank of Port Harriet, and lowered 21 Gemini assault craft into the water. They contained 84 special forces troopers of Lieutenant-Commander Guillermo Sánchez-Sabarots's 1st Amphibious Commandos Group and a small party under Lieutenant-Commander Pedro Giachino, who was second-in-command of the 1st Marine Infantry Battalion and had volunteered for the mission to capture Government House. Argentine Rear Admiral Jorge Allara, through a message radioed from Santisima Trinidad, had requested from Rex Hunt a peaceful surrender, but the request was rejected.

Giachino's party had the shortest distance to go: two and a half miles due north. Moody Brook Barracks, the destination of the main party, was six miles (9.7 km) away over rough terrain. Sánchez-Sabarots, in the book The Argentine Fight for the Falklands, described the main party's progress in the dark:

It was a nice night, with a moon, but the cloud covered the moon for most of the time. It was very hard going with our heavy loads; it was hot work. We eventually became split up into three groups. We only had one night sight; the lead man, Lieutenant Arias had it. One of the groups became separated when a vehicle came along the track we had to cross. We thought it was a military patrol. Another group lost contact, and the third separation was caused by someone going too fast. This caused my second in command, Lieutenant Bardi, to fall. He suffered a hairline fracture of the ankle and had to be left behind with a man to help him. We were at Moody Brook by 5.30 a.m., just on the limits of the time planned, but with no time for the one hour's reconnaissance for which we had hoped.

The main party of Argentine Marines assumed that the Moody Brook Barracks contained sleeping Royal Marines. The barracks were quiet, although a light was on in the office of the Royal Marine commander. No sentries were observed, and it was a quiet night. Sánchez-Sabarots could hear nothing suggesting any action at Government House nor from the distant landing beaches. Nevertheless, he ordered the assault to begin. Sánchez-Sabarots's account continued:

It was still completely dark. We were going to use tear-gas to force the British out of the buildings and capture them. Our orders were not to cause casualties if possible. That was the most difficult mission of my career. All our training as commandos was to fight aggressively and inflict maximum casualties on the enemy. We surrounded the barracks with machine-gun teams, leaving only one escape route along the peninsula north of Stanley Harbour. Anyone who did get away would not be able to reach the town and reinforce the British there. Then we threw the gas grenades into each building. There was no reaction; the barracks were empty.

The noise of the grenades alerted Major Norman to the presence of Argentines on the island, so he drove back to Government House. Realising that the attack was coming from Moody Brook, he ordered all troop sections to converge on Government House to enable the defence to be centralised. Around this time, most of the Falkland Islands Defence Force received similar orders and fell back to Drill Hall. Sergeant Gerald Cheek from the FIDF recalled: "We were requested to phone in to HQ whenever possible, and when I made the routine call at 06.00 hours Phil Summers informed me that the Governor had said FIDF members were not to engage with the enemy under any circumstances, and they were to surrender when ordered to do so without offering any resistance."

Although there were no Royal Marine witnesses to the assault, British descriptions of the state of Moody Brook barracks afterwards contradict the Argentine version of events. After the Royal Marines were allowed to return to barracks to collect personal items. Norman describes walls of the barracks as riddled with machine gun fire and bearing the marks of white phosphorus grenades—"a classic houseclearing operation". The Argentines maintain that the barracks were destroyed in an air attack by Harriers from No. 1 Squadron RAF on 12 June 1982—involving Flight Lieutenant Mark Hare and Wing Commander Peter Squire—that killed three conscripts and wounded their commander Major José Rodolfo Banetta from the 10th Mechanized Infantry Brigade Headquarters Company.

=== Amphibious landing at Yorke Bay ===
There was a more pressing action on the eastern edge of Stanley. Twenty LVTP-7A1 Argentine tracked amphibious armoured personnel carriers from Lieutenant-Commander Carlos Alberto Cazzaniga's 1st Amphibious Vehicles Battalion, carrying D and E Companies of the 2nd Marine Infantry Battalion (BIM-2) from Puerto Belgrano, had been landed from the tank landing ship ARA Cabo San Antonio at Yorke Bay, and were being watched by a section of Royal Marines under the command of Lieutenant Bill Trollope. Two Argentine-built landing craft also took part in the landings later that morning and would fall into British hands at the end of the fighting in June.

The armoured column drove along the Airport Road into Stanley, with three Amtracs in the vanguard, and, near the Ionospheric Research Station, at exactly 7:15 a.m., was engaged by a section of Royal Marines with anti-tank rockets and machine guns. Lieutenant-Commander Hugo Santillán later wrote an official post-battle report.

We were on the last stretch of the road into Stanley. A machine-gun fired from one of the three white houses about 500 metres away and hit the right-hand Amtrac. The fire was very accurate. Then there were some explosions from a rocket launcher, but they were inaccurate, falling a long way from us. We followed our standard operating procedure and took evasive action. The Amtrac on the right returned fire and took cover in a little depression. Once he was out of danger, I told all three vehicles to disembark their men. I ordered the crew with the recoilless rifle to fire one round of hollow charge at the ridge of the roof of the house where the machine-gun was, to cause a bang but not an explosion. We were still following our orders not to inflict casualties. The first round was about a hundred metres short, but the second hit the roof. The British troops then threw a purple smoke grenade; I thought it was their signal to withdraw. They had stopped firing, so Commander Weinstabl started the movement of the two companies around the position. Some riflemen in one of the houses started firing then; that was quite uncomfortable. I couldn't pinpoint their location, but one of my other Amtracs could and asked permission to open up with a mortar which he had. I authorized this, but only with three rounds and only at the roofs of the houses. Two rounds fell short, but the third hit right in the centre of the roof; that was incredible. The British ceased firing then.

The Amtrac on the right manoeuvred itself off the road into a little depression and as it did so, disembarked the Marines inside—including one wounded, Private Horacio Tello—out of view. This encouraged the Royal Marines to think that Gibbs had scored a direct hit on the passenger compartment of the APC. According to Santillán, this vehicle took 97 rounds and another lost its tracks.

Trollope, with No. 2 Section, describes the action: "Six Armoured Personnel Carriers began advancing at speed down the Airport Road. The first APC was engaged at a range of about 200 to 250 metres. The first three missiles, two 84 mm and one 66 mm, missed. Subsequently one 66 mm fired by Marine [Mark] Gibbs hit the passenger compartment and one 84 mm Marines [George] Brown and [Danny] Betts hit the front. Both rounds exploded and no fire was received from that vehicle. The remaining five APCs which were about 600 to 700 metres away deployed their troops and opened fire. We engaged them with GPMG, SLR and sniper rifle [Sergeant Ernie Shepherd] for about a minute before we threw a white phosphorus smoke grenade and leap-frogged back to the cover of gardens. Incoming fire at that stage was fairly heavy, but mostly inaccurate."

According to Governor Hunt in his memoirs, Marines Brown and Betts brought the leading Amtrac to a screeching halt with a direct hit in one of the forward tracks while Marine Gibbs scored another hit in the passenger compartment: "About this time, we received the heartening news that the section led by Mike's second-in-command, Bill Trollope, had knocked out the first APC. They put an 84mm rocket into the tracks and a 66mm rocket into the passenger compartment. They stood ready to shoot anybody who got out, but nobody did."

Trollope and his men withdrew along Davis Street, running behind the houses with Argentine Marines in hot pursuit, and went to ground firing up the road when it became obvious they could not reach Government House. Corporal Lou Armour, commanding '1 Section', was positioned at Hookers Point when the invasion began. Shortly after the attack on Moody Brook, he was ordered to withdraw to Government House, meeting up with Corporal David Carr's section along the way. "The marines, now numbering sixteen, decided to try and work their way around to the back of the ridge where the Argentinians were positioned, and then charge down to Government House, hopefully taking the enemy by surprise. But as they moved through the edges of the town they came under fire at every street corner and it was eventually so heavy they had to abandon their plan."

As both sections headed off to find Trollope's men, Armour decided to have one more try at getting into Government House. Using fire and manoeuvre to cross a football pitch they then crawled along the hedgerow leading to the gardens where they experienced friendly fire. According to Armour: "I had a running battle with a bunch of Argentines in armored vehicles who were chasing me and my section back toward Stanley. When we eventually got to government house, we were taking fire from three directions: the Argentines who were attacking the house, both behind and in front, and our own guys, who were in the house and thought we were another Argentine snatch squad trying to get in. So that was a bit hairy. An Argentine was killed that day and a few more wounded."

They eventually made it to safety via the kitchen door. Again according to Armour: "One Section pepper-potted down the road towards the wood where we knew Government House to be. Movement was slow as we had to crawl and monkey run until we reached the hospital. It was now broad daylight. From there the section fired and manoeuvred behind the nurses' home and across the football pitch until we reached a hedgegrow. I informed Marine Parker to call out, 'Royal Marines!' as we approached the house. We were eventually heard by Corporal Pares, who told us where the enemy were. The section, under cover from Corporal Pares, then dashed into the house where we were deployed upstairs by Major Noott."

In the meantime, Corporal Stefan York and his section had been patiently manning their hiding place on the western end of Navy Point. As Argentine landing craft were reported approaching Stanley Harbour, Marine Rick Overall fired a Carl Gustav anti-tank round which the British, in an interview with military historian Martin Middlebrook, claimed to have penetrated the side of an Argentine Marine Landing Craft Vehicle Personnel, killing all on board. According to Lieutenant-Commander Hugo Jorge Santillán, an Amtrack Amphibious Recovery Vehicle around this time had entered Stanley Harbour after the capture of Government House, to carry out emergency repairs on the two amphibious armoured personnel carriers that had been damaged in the earlier gun-battle near the Ionospheric Research Station. Local fireman Neville Bennett kept a diary of the Argentine occupation and would report seeing one amphibious personnel carrier in difficulty after losing one of its tracks, "Some of the APCs were to be seen moving down the other side of the harbour. One appeared to be in difficulty, I think it had shed a track. One of the helicopters goes over to look at it, all fixed and they move off again towards the naval fuel depot with its tanks and diesel and other stores."

Major Mike Norman wrote in his book about the Navy Point defenders: "All well and good, but if an enemy landing craft had been sunk in the Narrows, by Corporal York's 4 Section, I would certainly have heard about it—they were in constant radio contact with my HQ. No such incident was ever mentioned."

=== Battle of Government House ===
Lying on a small hillock south of Government House, Lieutenant-Commander Pedro Giachino faced the difficulty of capturing this tactically important objective with no radio and with a force of only sixteen men. He split his force into small groups, placing one on either side of the house and one at the rear. Unknown to them, the governor's residence was the main concentration point of the Royal Marines, who outnumbered the commandos by over two to one.

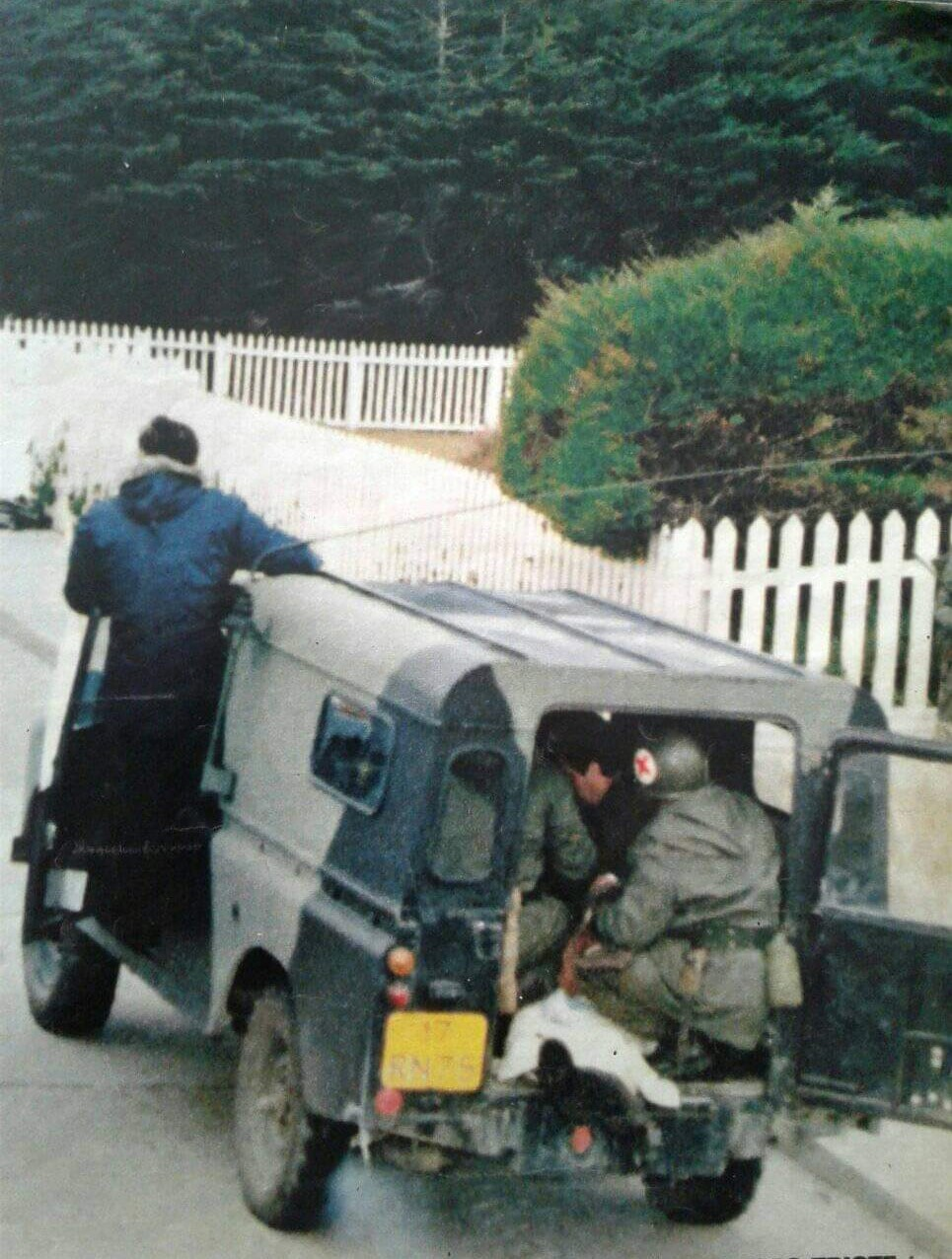
Giachino being treated by Argentine medic moments before his eventual death

The first attack against this building came at 6.30 a.m., barely an hour before the Yorke Bay amphibious landing, when one of Giachino's squads, led by Lieutenant Gustavo Adolfo Lugo, started to exchange fire with the British troops inside the house. At the same time, Giachino himself, with four of his subordinates, entered the servants' annex, believing it to be the rear entrance to the residence. Four Royal Marines, Corporals Mick Sellen and Colin Jones and Marines Harry Dorey and Murray Paterson, who were placed to cover the annex, repelled the first attack. Giachino was hit instantly as he burst through the door, while Lieutenant Diego Garcia Quiroga was shot in the arm. The remaining three retreated to the maid's quarters.

Giachino was not dead, but very badly wounded. An Argentine combat medic, Corporal Ernesto Urbina, attempted to get to Giachino but was wounded by a grenade. Giachino, seeing what had happened, pulled the pin from a hand grenade and threatened to use it. The Royal Marines then attempted to persuade the officer to get rid of the grenade so that they could give him medical treatment, but he refused, preventing them from reaching his position. After the surrender of the British forces at Government House, some three hours later, Lieutenant-Commander Giachino was taken to Stanley Hospital but died from loss of blood.

At the governor's office, Major Norman received a radio report from Corporal York's section, which was positioned at Camber Peninsula, observing any possible Argentine ship entering Stanley Harbour. The corporal proceeded to report on three potential targets in sight and ask which he should engage first. "What are the targets?" the major enquired. "Target number one is an aircraft carrier, target number two is a cruiser", at which point the line went dead.

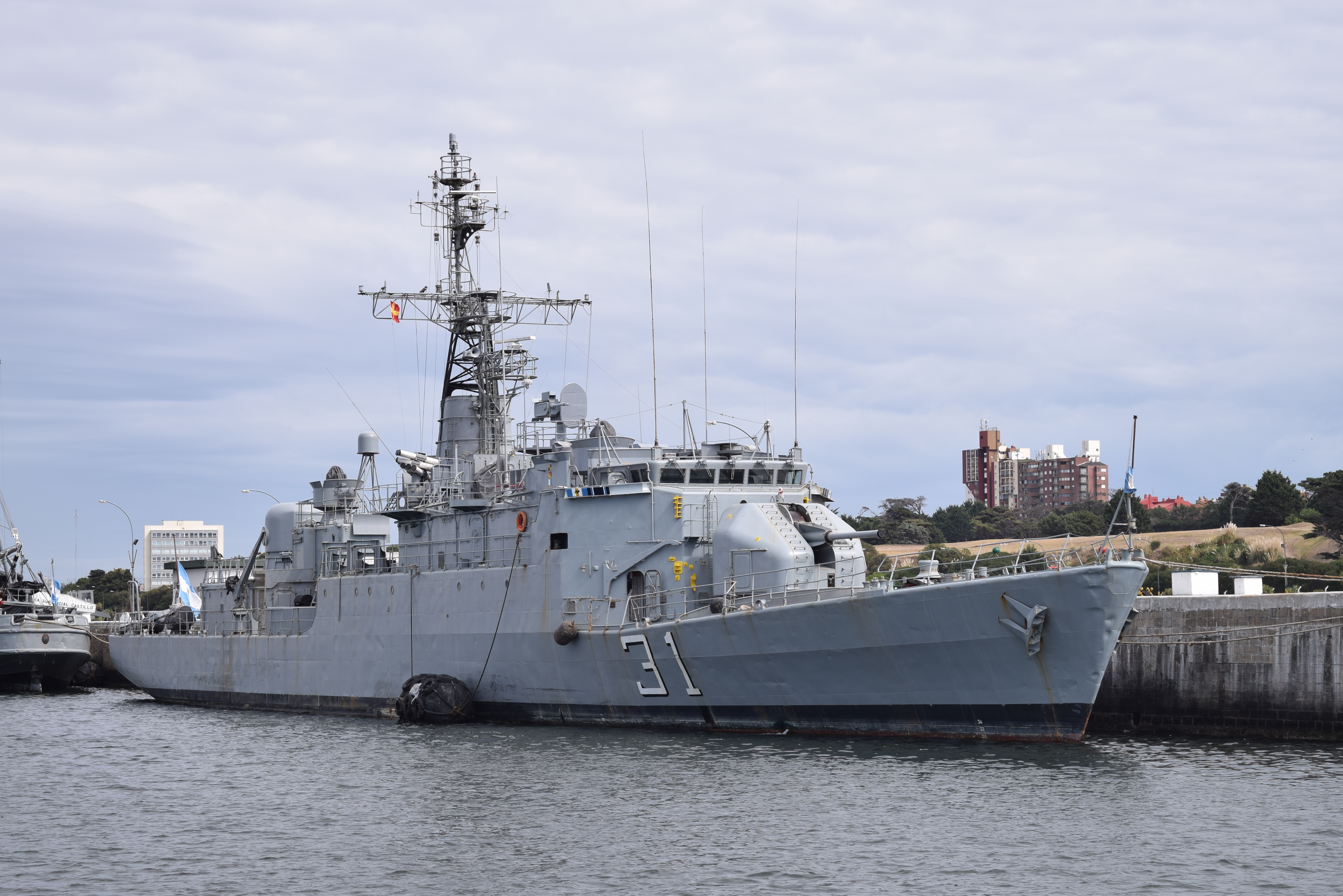
ARA Drummond

After firing a rocket at an amphibious vehicle heading to Yorke Bay, York decided to withdraw his section and proceeded to booby trap their Carl Gustaf 8.4 cm recoilless rifle, before paddling their Gemini assault boat north across Port William. As he did so, York said they were chased and fired upon by an Argentine warship (either the corvette ARA Drummond or Granville). His initiative led to the Gemini reaching an anchored Polish fishing vessel and hiding the small assault boat under her shadow. They patiently waited for a chance, before moving to the shore and landing on a small beach. Argentine sources say the Drummond laid down suppressing fire on a cove north of Port William where unidentified personnel had been spotted, in support of Cabo San Antonio, whose crew had reported a "missile falling short to starboard", apparently launched from the area. Other Argentine navy's reports claim that the action at Port Williams was carried out by ARA Granville.

Back at Government House, the Argentine commandos' pressure continued. There is some evidence that their use of stun grenades, mistaken as high-explosive rifle-grenades and/or mortars, and their continuous shift of firing positions during the battle led the Royal Marines inside to believe they were facing a large company of marines and were hopelessly outnumbered. Actually, after the failure of Giachino's small platoon to break into the residence, the British were surrounded by only a dozen amphibious commandos. These men were under Lieutenant Lugo, Giachino's second-in-command. The Land Rovers used by the Royal Marines were disabled by automatic gunfire from the commandos.

Governor Hunt called Patrick Watts—at the radio station, Radio Stanley—by telephone and said he believed the assaulting force to be the equivalent of a reinforced company: "We're staying put here, but we are pinned down. We can't move. (...) They must have 200 around us now. They've been throwing rifle grenades at us; I think there may be mortars, I don't know. They came along very quickly and very close, and then they retreated. Maybe they are waiting until the APCs [Amtracs] come along and they think they'll lose less casualties that way."

Corporals Geordie Gill and Terry Pares, both snipers, also claimed to have shot several Argentines through the chest and head as they attempted to scatter along the hillside overlooking Government House: "We dropped a number of Argentinians as they approached and I had a couple in my sights and made sure they were taken out of the game. It was initially estimated that we had killed five and injured seventeen, but we only counted the bodies that we saw drop in front of us." Major Norman's estimate is that Corporals Pares and Gills killed or wounded some four or five Argentine special forces: "Corporals Pares and Gill, were doing an excellent job. Gill would look through his sniper scope and tell Pares where the enemy were and Pares would fire ten rounds rapid, and as soon as that got them on the move, Gill would take them out with the sniper rifle. They took out four or five this way and all the time they were giving the rest of us a running commentary."

In the official history of both sides, Argentine casualties are listed as one killed and three badly wounded outside Government House. Another three Argentine Marines (Private Horacio Tello, Padre Ángel Maffezini and Lieutenant-Commander Hugo Santillán) were injured taking cover in the skirmishes in and around Port Stanley. During the gun-battle, Kenneth Clarke was one of four British correspondents covering the events from the home of the Governor's Secretary as the Argentine Marine Special Forces sheltering behind hedges and rocks attacked Government House less than 100 metres away. Clarke could hear the gunfire and feel the explosions. As dawn broke a bullet from an Argentine sniper came through a bedroom window and parted his hair.

Around 7.30 a.m., the local police commander Ronnie Lamb, had to order two Falkland Islands Police officers to nearby Government House, in order to rescue a civilian, Henry Halliday, as he blissfully headed off to work, despite the fierce gun-battle taking place all around him. Eventually, Hunt decided to enter talks with Argentine commanders around 8:30 a.m., after Major Norman warned him "that our defence would be determined, unrelenting—but would be relatively short-lived". The liaison was Vice-Commodore Hector Gilobert, the head in the islands of LADE, the Argentine government's airline company. Gilobert and a governor's deputy went to the Argentine headquarters displaying a white flag. A de facto ceasefire was put in place at that time which was occasionally breached by small arms fire.

The governor's envoys found the Argentine command post at Stanley's town hall. The Argentine commander accepted the British offer of a face to face meeting with Hunt in his battered office. While the negotiations were still going on, another incident occurred inside the residence. Three Argentine amphibious commandos who survived the first skirmish along the compound inadvertently alerted Major Noott to their presence, while they had been preparing to leave their hiding place. The Major fired his Sterling submachine gun into the ceiling of the maid's room. According to British reports, the stunned commandos tumbled down the stairs, laying their weapons on the ground. They became the first Argentine prisoners of war of the Falklands War, although by then Governor Hunt had already been in contact with Argentine officials negotiating the terms of surrender.

The version of Lieutenant Commander Cufré, who was then at Stanley airport, is that the three Amphibious Commandos supporting Giachino's party kept their positions right to the end of the hostilities. Admiral Carlos Büsser, commander in chief of the operation, states that a ceasefire was already in place when the three commandos, after realising that the battle was coming to a close and that any loss of life at the time would be futile, laid down their arms to the marines in order to assist the wounded. Just a few minutes after this event, Government House capitulated.

==== Surrender ====
Meanwhile, the Royal Marines in the house saw the approaching Amtracs that had been engaged earlier by Lieutenant Trollope and his section. The Amtracs were Rex Hunt's biggest problem, because they could take up positions outside the range of the Royal Marines and blast Government House to pieces. The vehicles pushed on toward Moody Brook to link up with Lieutenant-Commander Guillermo Sánchez-Sabarots. His amphibious commandos were plodding slowly along the road to reinforce their colleagues besieging Government House after taking some prisoners near the racecourse. The majority of the FIDF soldiers were captured inside Drill Hall, where they had barricaded themselves a few hours earlier with one section captured near Government House and escorted back to the hall to join their fellow reservists. Two other sections were captured with the fall of Government House and ordered to lie face down with the Royal Marines. In the meantime, the naval detachment from HMS Endurance at Government House began to shred official documents.

Major Norman had earlier advised Governor Hunt that the Royal Marines and the governor could break out to the countryside and set up a 'seat of government' elsewhere, but when he finally met the commander of the Argentine seaborne forces, Admiral Büsser, he agreed to surrender his troops to the now overwhelming Argentine forces at 9:30 a.m. It was a hard decision for Governor Hunt to make:

With a heavy heart, I turned to Mike and told him to give the order to lay down arms. I could not bring myself to use the word surrender. Mike's face was a mixture of relief and anguish: it was not part of his training to surrender, but his good sense told him that there was no real alternative. As Gary accompanied Busser to tend the wounded round Government House, Mike told his radio operator to instruct all sections to down arms and wait to be collected.

While Major Noott accompanied Busser outside Government House, the British officer applied morphine and the tourniquet on the Argentine wounded that would staunch the heavy bleeding and, Lieutenant Diego García Quiroga would later say Noott saved his life. He was rushed to Stanley Hospital where two doctors operated on him after cutting through his heavy clothing using scissors. Corporal Ernesto Urbina was given plasma in Stanley Hospital which saved his life.

Before Hunt's capitulation, Sánchez-Sabarots had to order a section of his men to release the Argentine nationals that Vice-Commodore Gilobert reported were being held under guard inside Town Hall. But, before they could arrive Commander Alfredo Raúl Weinstabl and his adjutant, Lieutenant Juan Carlos Martinelli and several marines from his tactical headquarters secured the Town Hall and Stanley Police Station buildings. According to Weinstabl:

The town was silent. Arriving at the place we had chosen as the Battalion Command Post, we found abandoned weapons and packs. I ordered Lieutenant Martinelli to recce the building and within a short while he returned with about thirty men and women who came out of it smiling. They were Argentines who had been locked in that place the night before. Almost opposite was the Police Station. Inside were six or seven policemen with their Chief and a group of sailors from an oceanographic research ship. I ordered the Police Chief to send the constables home and to tell them not to come out until they were told.

Hunt would later state in mid-April that the defenders fired 6,000 rounds in the fighting at Government House and elsewhere. The Falklands Governor disputed Argentine claims that the seaborne assault resulted in only one Argentine dead and two wounded, telling Time Magazine for its 12 April 1982 issue that at least five and possibly 15 invaders were killed and 17 were wounded in the invasion. Major Norman, in 2007, confirmed the defending British marines and Royal Navy sailors fired 6,450 small-arms rounds and 12 rockets in the fighting on 2 April 1982.

Fearing that British had established an observation post on Tussock Island, Major Mario Castagneto's 601st Commando Company was sent to clear the island of enemy special forces, but returned empty handed and completely covered in black soot due to another Pucara napalm bombing on 1 May. Nevertheless, several Falkland Islanders maintain the belief that the napalm attacks were part of a cover-up to hide the Argentine losses suffered during the initial fighting codenamed Rosario.

After the surrender, the Royal Marines and two rifle sections under Corporals Gerald Cheek and Pat Peck from the FIDF were then herded onto the playing fields. Photographs were taken by British journalist Simon Winchester of The Sunday Times, showing the British prisoners arranged face-down on the ground and were smuggled out by Rex Hunt's son Tony. The images galvanised the British public when they were broadcast on television and increased public opposition to the invasion. Corporal Armour's section had fought on the second floor at Government House and was taken prisoner:

There were three casualties lying in the garden of Government House. You think: What sort of mood are they going to be in when their oppos are shot up? When we were actually lying down I felt a bit humiliated but I also felt apprehensive about what was going to happen next. One of the Argentine officers came along and actually struck one of the guards and told us to stand up. We stood up and he shook my hand and a few other guys' hands and said that we shouldn't lie down, that we should be proud of what we'd done.

The Royal Marines had fought with bravery and skill for they had killed one of his best officers—Lieutenant-Commander Giachino, 2IC of the 1st Marine Battalion—Carlos Busser said. Now they could lay down their arms with their military honour intact. The appeal succeeded in that the governor decided he had no choice but to accept the inevitable. The Royal Marines were allowed, 10 at a time, to return to Moody Brook Barracks under armed guard and once inside were given ten minutes to pack their personal belongings.

In a final act of defiance, Rex Hunt donned his ceremonial uniform, complete with ostrich plumes and sword, for the drive to Stanley Airport in his staff car before they boarded their plane. "We feel as though we are deserting everyone, but what can we do?" Hunt's tearful wife, Mavis, told British journalist Kenneth Clarke.

Soon afterward, the Royal Marines were moved to a C-130 Hercules transport aircraft, which would take them to Comodoro Rivadavia, where they were to be picked up by another airliner to Uruguay and on to the United Kingdom. Members of the FIDF were not taken to Argentina along with members of NP 8901; instead they were disarmed and returned to their homes.

The 77 British marines and Royal Navy sailors were treated to a heroes' welcome when they landed on 5 April, at RAF Brize Norton in Britain and in the press conference that followed, Rex Hunt (in the presence of Majors Noot and Norman) informed the world press that the Port Stanley defenders had killed at least five Argentine soldiers, wounded 17 others and captured three attackers, destroying an armored personnel carrier in the process along with 10 more soldiers inside "who never resurfaced". In his final report from Port Stanley that was published on 5 April, Kenneth Clarke from the Daily Telegraph confirmed the tribute that the Argentine Marine Corps commander had paid to the Royal Marine defenders and denied that he and the other British journalists had been subjected to intimidation, as reported by one British newspaper.

Corporal York's section remained at large. On 4 April, they reached Long Island Farm owned by a Mrs Watson. York had no radio, and due to worries about possible civilian deaths, chose to surrender to Argentine forces. They gave their position to the Argentine Army using a local islander's radio, and York subsequently ordered his men to destroy and then bury their weapons. Major Patricio Dowling and a platoon from the 181 military police company platoon were helicoptered forward and after roughly handling Yorke's men and posing for pictures, locked up the Royal Marines men in Stanley Police Station. Yorke's section would then be held in Comodoro Rivadavia along with Lieutenant Keith Mill's 22-man platoon and supporting 13-man British Antarctic Survey detachment under Steve Martin captured in South Georgia.

In 2022, British tank expert Andrew Hills after examining all the evidence available, concluded that no Argentine Amphibious Personnel Carrier was lost during the invasion, although one clearly lost a track to an anti-tank rocket.

==== Stanley Police ====
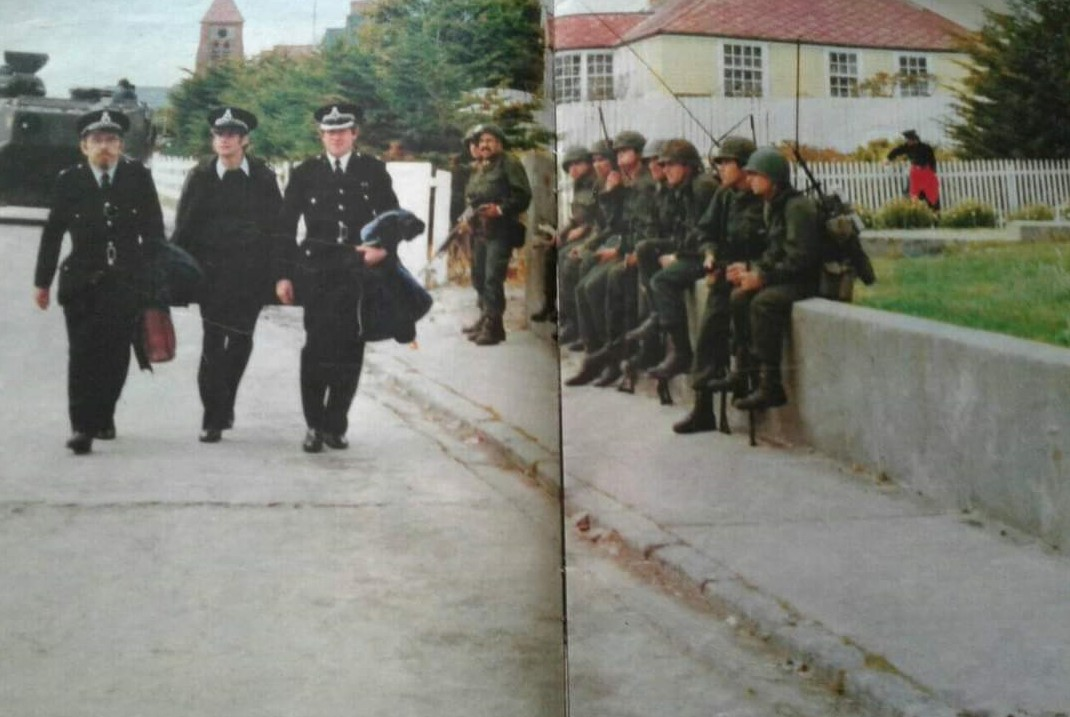
Three Stanley policemen leaving their posts

The police commander, Ronnie Lamb, was deported soon after the occupation and the other full-time officer left soon afterwards on their own accord, leaving a squad of Special Constables who had been recruited hastily on the eve of the invasion but that had left the service—with the exception of 19-year constable Anton Livermore—in the week that followed rather than be seen as cooperating with the enemy.

== Reaction in the United Nations ==
On 3 April 1982, the United Nations Security Council passed Resolution 502 demanding an immediate withdrawal of all Argentine forces from the islands and calling on the governments of Argentina and the United Kingdom to seek a diplomatic solution to the situation and to refrain from further military action.

== Informing London ==
At 16:30 local time on 2 April 1982, the last telex conversation between the operator in the Falklands and an operative in London announced that the islands were under Argentine control.

== Operation timeline ==
Operation Rosario

The timeline of the operation was as follows:

1. 21:30 1 April – The Type 42 destroyer ARA Santisima Trinidad begins loading naval commandos of the Amphibious Commandos Group into 21 small inflatable motor boats. These set out for Mullet Creek but sail too far north and are caught up in beds of kelp, which cause problems for the boats. They decide to head for the nearest beach, which is near Lake Point.
2. 23:00 1 April – The first group of 84 men lands on an unnamed beach at Lake Point. The group splits into a smaller force led by Lieutenant-Commander Giachino which heads towards Government House, and a larger force commanded by Lieutenant-Commander Sabarots which heads towards Moody Brook barracks.
3. 04:30 2 April – A small advanced team of the Tactical Divers Group is landed undetected from the Submarine ARA Santa Fe near Yorke Bay.
4. 05:30 2 April – Lieutenant-Commander Sabarots' force reaches and surrounds the barracks. They throw grenades into the buildings and storm the buildings with heavy machine gun fire. They find the buildings deserted.
5. 06:00 2 April – 20 FMC Amtracs and several LARC-V stores-carrying vehicles land on Yorke Bay from the LST ARA Cabo San Antonio. The force splits into 3 groups:
  - A four Amtrac vanguard. Including one carrying the Army Platoon.
  - The main force of 14 Amtracs.
  - The second in command, a recovery Amtrac and LARC vehicles.
6. 06:30 2 April – The first Amtracs meet no resistance. The Army platoon secures the deserted airport, previously swept by Navy tactical divers.
7. 06:30 2 April – An Argentine force of 16 naval commandos reaches Government House, where they are stopped by 31 Royal Marines, 11 armed Royal Navy personnel and 1 local. Three Argentines are wounded, including the leader of the platoon, Lieutenant-Commander Giachino, who later dies. Another three are later captured inside the House, although by then (around 8:00) talks with Argentine officials about the surrender had already begun.
8. 07:15 2 April – Having met no resistance, the Argentine Amtracs advance on Stanley, when they are ambushed from a house about 500 metres from the road. Royal Marines use rockets and machine guns. The Royal Marines fall back to government house. One of the Amtracs is scarred by machine gun fire, and there is one minor injury.
9. 08:30 2 April – The Argentine Amtrac force secures Stanley.
10. Lieutenant Colonel Seineldín's Regiment 25th platoon begin to clear the runway, while Navy tactical divers from the party landed by ARA Santa Fe provide security on the airport and seize the lighthouse.

== See also ==
- Events leading to the Falklands War
- Falkland Islands sovereignty dispute – Territorial dispute between Argentina and the United Kingdom
- Invasion of South Georgia – April 1982 battle during the Falklands War
- Falklands War – 1982 undeclared Argentina–United Kingdom war
- Occupation of the Falkland Islands – Argentine administration during the Falklands War, formally dissolved 1985
- Reassertion of British sovereignty over the Falkland Islands (1833)
- An Ungentlemanly Act – 1992 British television film by Stuart Urban
