= Government House, Falkland Islands =

Government House
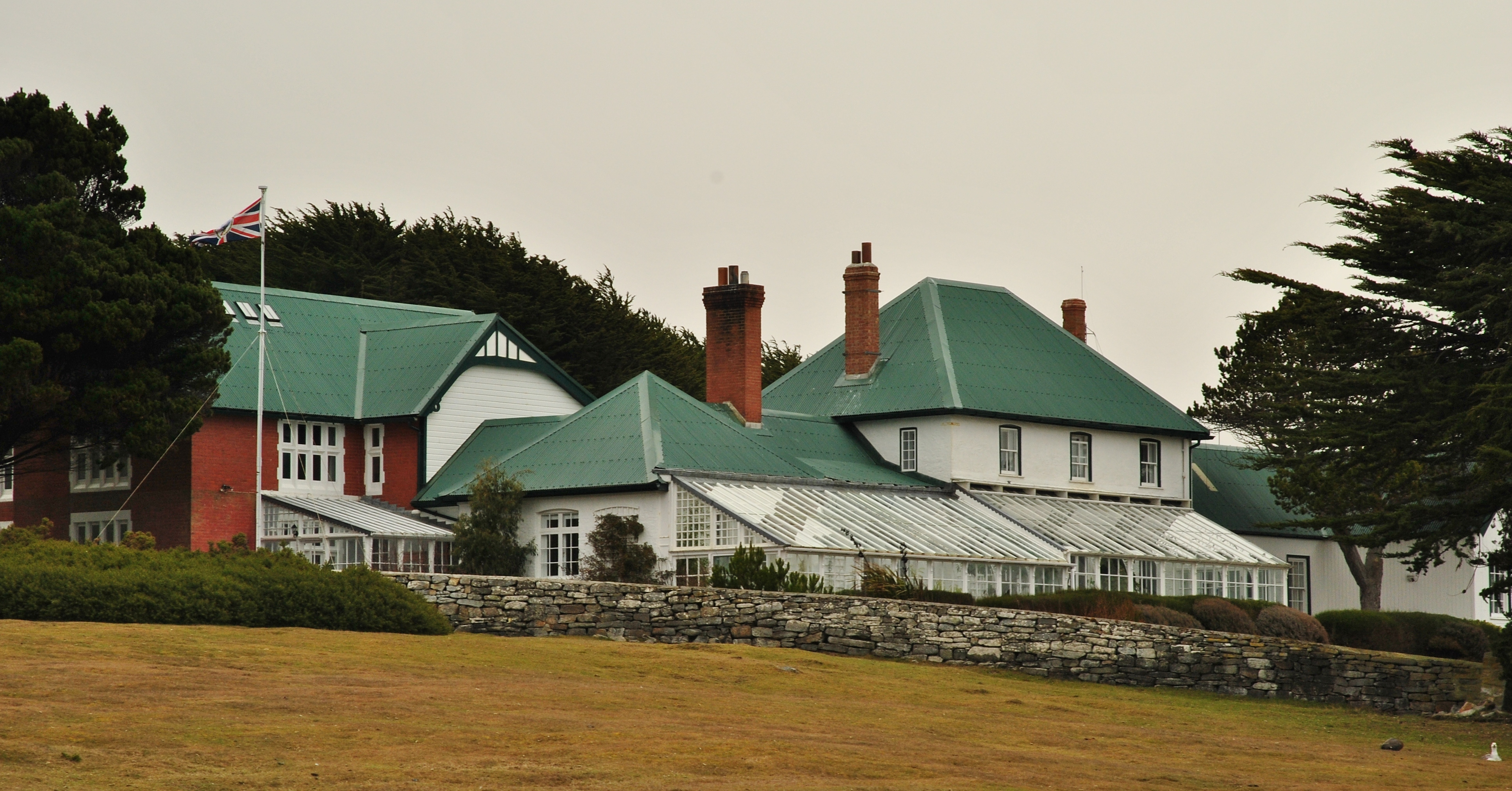
- Government House in Stanley
- Interactive map of the Government House area

General information
- Location: Stanley, Falkland Islands
- Coordinates: 51°41′30″S 57°52′21″W
- Completed: 1845
- Client: Government of the Falkland Islands

Website
- Official website

Government House in Stanley has been the home of the Falkland Islands' governors since the mid-19th century.

== History ==
The official residence was built in 1845.

The 1911 Encyclopædia Britannica says in the Falkland Islands article that "Government House, grey, stone-built and slated, calls to mind a manse in Shetland or Orkney."

There is a conservatory on the northern side of the building, which Prince Philip, Duke of Edinburgh, visited during his tour of the Falklands in 1991. One of the world's southernmost grapevines grows there, of the Black Hamburg variety.

Ernest Shackleton stayed here during his famous expedition. Allegedly, he described his time there as being "far colder than any time on the ice".

It is a listed building.

It was the site of a major battle and of the surrender during the 1982 invasion of the Falkland Islands.

== See also ==
- Government Houses of the British Empire
- Governor of the Falkland Islands
