= Pedro Giachino =

Argentine Navy officer (1947–1982)

Pedro Edgardo Giachino
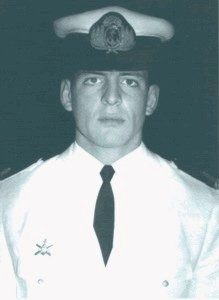
- Born: 28 May 1947; Mendoza, Mendoza, Argentina
- Died: 2 April 1982 (aged 34); Port Stanley, Falkland Islands
- Education: Military Naval School
- Military career
- Allegiance: Argentina
- Branch: Argentine Navy
- Service years: 1964–1982
- Rank: Frigate captain
- Conflicts: Falklands War: Operation Rosario †

Capitan de Corbeta Pedro Edgardo Giachino (28 May 1947 – 2 April 1982), was an Argentine Navy officer who became the first serviceman killed in action during the Falklands War.

== Falklands War ==
Giachino was the leader of a platoon of Amphibious Commandos Group and died of wounds in Stanley's hospital after the battle of Government House, which resulted in the surrender of Falklands' Governor Rex Hunt and the Royal Marines detachment during the Argentine invasion of 1982.

He was awarded posthumously the Argentine Nation to the Heroic Valour in Combat Cross and promoted to the rank of captain.

=== Burial place ===
He was first buried at Puerto Belgrano, but owing to a letter from his 13-year-old daughter to President Raúl Alfonsín in 1985, his remains were moved to Mar del Plata, the hometown of his family and the birthplace of his wife. The naval base of Mar del Plata was also the headquarters of the forces he led in combat at the time of his death.

== Alleged human rights violations during the 1976 dictatorship ==
A number of witnesses' statements surfaced in 2011, accusing Giachino of being the commander of the illegal repression of militants in the area of Zárate-Campana, in northern Buenos Aires Province, between 1976 and 1977, during the dirty war. One of the main witnesses, former marine non-commissioned officer Alfredo Molinari had several run ins with Giachino after being caught in possession of Karl Marx's Das Kapital and later deserted his unit and took refuge in his parents house in Santiago del Estero. Another of his accusers, Victor Basterra, a Montoneros guerrilla being held at the Navy Petty-Officers School in Buenos Aires, claimed in an interview that Giachino had been part of the security apparatus there. Circumstantial evidence also mentions him as being in charge of the external security of Mar del Plata's naval base, at a time when a part of the military facilities was used as a detention and interrogation center. His death prevents any further legal investigation, but the pressure of Human Rights groups compelled the City Council of Mar del Plata to remove his portrait from the chamber, where both the fallen soldiers from Mar del Plata and the local victims of the Argentine dictatorship are honoured. On 13 July 2011, retired commander Fernando María Azcueta (former submarine ARA San Luis skipper that sortied against the Royal Navy in the Falklands War) announced that he would be returning the meritorious citizen diploma he received on the part of the Mar del Plata authorities, in protest at their decision to remove Giachino's portrait from the main hall. Fellow veterans that served in the submarines San Luis and Santa Fe also returned their awards as news spread in social media groups of Azcueta's decision.
