= Mar del Plata Naval Base =

Argentine Navy base

- Mar del Plata, Buenos Aires Province, Argentina
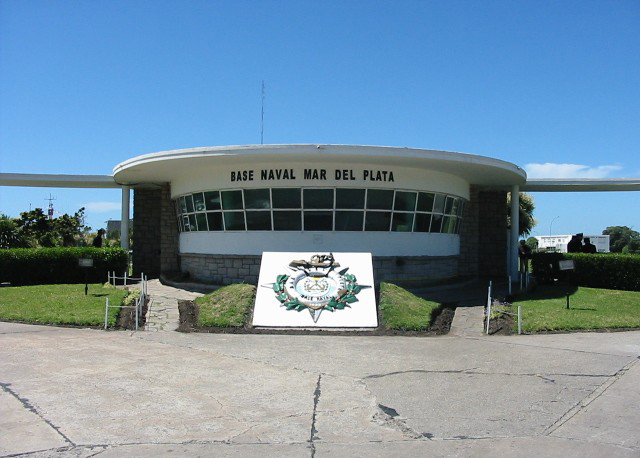

Site information
- Type: Naval base
- Operator: Argentine Navy
- Condition: Operational

Location
- Location in Argentina
- Coordinates: 38°02′10″S 57°32′06″W
- Area: 0 hectares (0 acres)

Site history
- Built: 1826
- In use: 1826 – present

The Mar del Plata Naval Base is a naval port facility of the Argentine Navy, situated in Mar del Plata in the province of Buenos Aires and home to the Argentine submarine fleet.

== Based ships ==
=== Patrol vessels ===
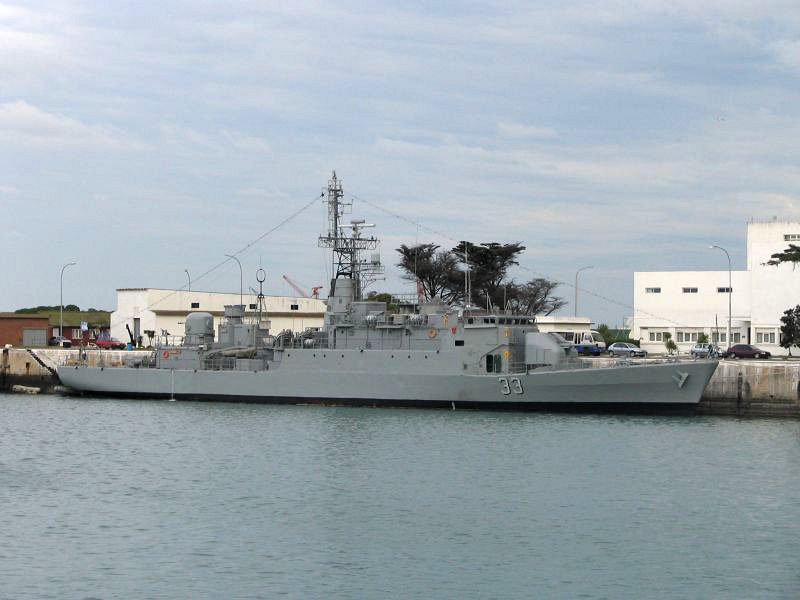
Corvette ARA Granville alongside in Mar Del Plata

- ARA Bouchard (P-51)
- ARA Piedrabuena (P-52)
- ARA Almirante Storni (P-53)

=== Hydrographic division ===
- ARA Puerto Deseado (Q-20)
- ARA Comodoro Rivadavia (Q-11)

=== Submarine fleet ===
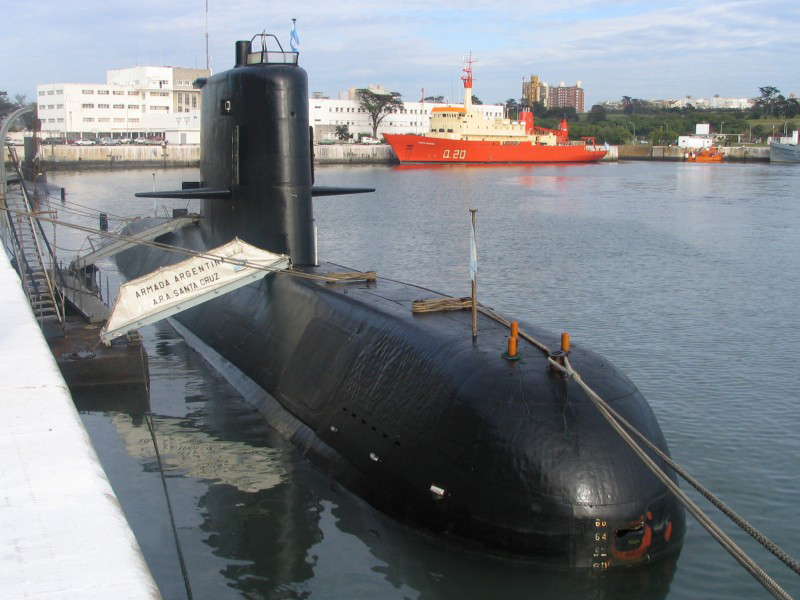
Submarine ARA Santa Cruz

- ARA Santa Cruz (S-41)
- ARA Salta (S-31)

=== Auxiliaries and research ===
- ARA Bahía Agradable (A-23)
- ARA Chulupí (R-10)
- ARA Chiquiyán (R-18)
- ARA Suboficial Castillo (A-6)

== See also ==
- Port Belgrano Naval Base
- Ushuaia Naval Base
- Falklands Naval Station
