= Amphibious Commandos Group =

Military unit of the Argentine Marine Corps

- Agrupación de Comandos Anfibios
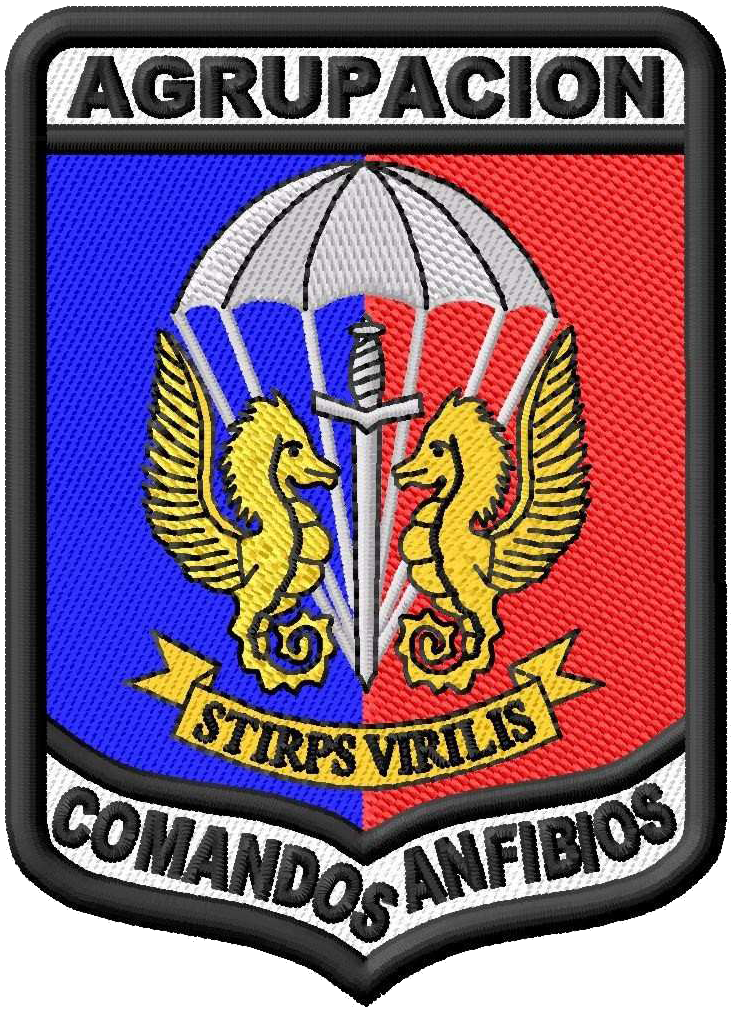
- Active: 1952-present
- Country: Argentina
- Branch: Argentine Marine Corps
- Type: Special operations forces
- Role: Amphibious Operations; Special Reconnaissance; Air Assault operations Direct Action; HALO/HAHO parachuting
- Size: 600 commandos
- Garrison/HQ: Puerto Belgrano
- Nickname(s): APCA
- Motto(s): 'Stirps Virilis'
- Engagements: Falklands War; 1982 invasion of the Falkland Islands
- Battle honours: Honor al valor en combate

Commanders
- Current: Lieutenant Commander Eduardo Manuel Álvarez
- Previous: Lieutenant Commander Luis Marcelo Martínez

The Amphibious Commandos Group (Spanish: Agrupación de Comandos Anfibios, APCA) is a special operations force of the Argentine Marine Corps.

== Role ==
Trained to perform quick and objective amphibious reconnaissance, assault raids, and direct action operations.

== History ==
It was created in 1952 as the Vigilance and Security Company of Submarine Bases (at Base Naval Mar del Plata).

In 1960 the group received its first advanced training course of amphibious reconnaissance, airborne, and HALO/HAHO parachuting in the Military Diving School and in the Argentine Army. With the personnel of the 7th Marine Corps Company, formed in 1966 the Amphibious Reconnaissance Company, it took new tasks and responsibilities.

The commando course was incorporated in the training in 1973, and in the next year the unit was renamed Amphibious Commandos Group. The members of this group wear green berets with unit badges.

The group participated in 1978 and 1979 in the Marine Corps force deployed to Tierra del Fuego, in the course of the Beagle crisis, executing many special operations missions.

During the late 1980s, the group was moved from Mar del Plata to its current base in Puerto Belgrano.

On 2 April 1982, the unit was part of the Amphibious Task Force leading the assault on Port Stanley, taking part in the battle of Government House and the assault on Moody Brook barracks. Members of the group also saw action of at South Georgia Islands and carried out a couple of reconnaissance missions from Port Stanley since 1 May. The group was awarded the Honor al Valor en Combate decoration.

=== Training ===
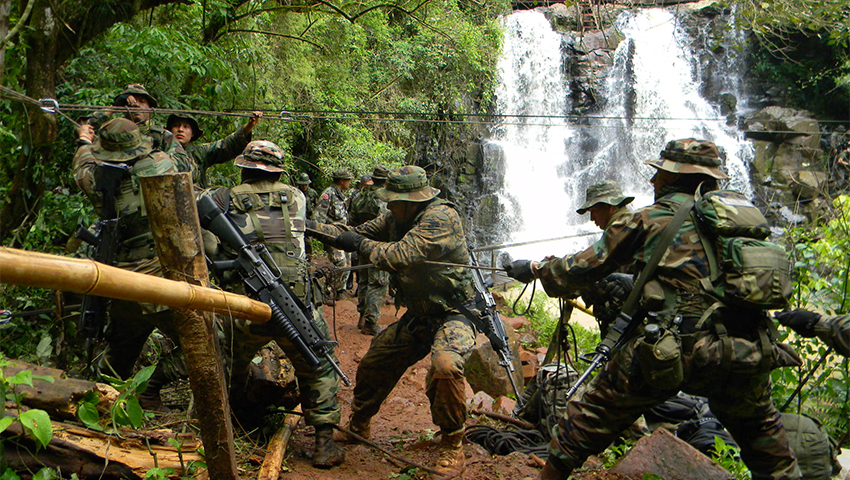
The unit in action

The amphibious command course lasts 1 year and is physically and mentally exhausting. 95% of applicants do not succeed.

Training course consists of the:

- amphibious warfare course
- mountain warfare course
- parachute course

Operatives are also trained as demolitions experts, multiple weapons experts and trained in Close quarters combat.

== Weapons ==
- Browning Hi-Power
- Heckler & Koch MP5
- Daniel Defense M4A1
- FAMAS
- M249 SAW
- FN MAG
- Heckler & Koch HK21
- M24 SWS
- Barrett M95
- AT4

== See also ==
- Argentine Navy
- Rapid Deployment Force
- Tactical Divers Group
- 601 Commando Company
