= LGBTQ rights in the Falkland Islands =

LGBTQ rights in Falkland Islands
- Falkland Islands
- Legal status: Legal since 1989, equal age of consent since 2005
- Military: UK responsible for defence
- Discrimination protections: Yes, sexual orientation only

Family rights
- Recognition of relationships: Same-sex marriage and civil partnerships since 2017
- Adoption: Yes, stepchild and joint adoption since 2017

Lesbian, gay, bisexual, transgender and queer (LGBTQ) people in the British Overseas Territory of the Falkland Islands enjoy most of the same rights as non-LGBTQ people. Marriage and civil partnerships have been open to both opposite-sex and same-sex couples since 29 April 2017. Discrimination on the basis of sexual orientation is constitutionally banned. Additionally, attitudes are largely positive; a public consultation found that 90% of respondents were in favour of same-sex marriage.

In April 2017, a pride event was held in the capital city of Stanley, a first for the islands.

== Law regarding same-sex sexual activity ==
Prior to 1989, same-sex sexual activity was a criminal offence. The age of consent was equalised at 16 in 2005.

== Recognition of same-sex relationships ==
The Falkland Islands was initially reluctant to allow for any formal recognition of same-sex relationships in local law.

On 13 May 2015, the Attorney General recommended that the Executive Council consider the legalisation of same-sex marriage or civil partnership. On 13 January 2016, following a public consultation, the Council instructed the Attorney General to prepare an amendment to the island's Marriage Ordinance 1996, in order to allow same-sex marriage. The public consultation found that 90% of respondents were in favour of same-sex marriage and 94% were in favour of civil partnerships for all couples.

The Attorney General's draft amendment was considered by the Executive Council on 22 February 2017. The Council, considering whether to approve a bill to legalise same-sex marriage and create civil partnership for both same-sex and opposite-sex couples, instructed the Attorney General to publish it in the official gazette, thereby commencing the legislative process as a first reading, as well as to prepare further legislation necessary to its implementation.

On 30 March 2017, the Legislative Assembly approved a same-sex marriage bill by a 7 to 1 vote. The bill allows same-sex couples to marry and also allows both same-sex and opposite-sex couples the right to access a civil partnership. The bill received royal assent by Governor Colin Roberts on 13 April 2017. The new law, known as the Marriage (Amendment) Act 2017, went into effect on 29 April 2017. A community event to celebrate same-sex marriage becoming legal took place that same day.

Sections 3A and 3B of the Falkland Islands Marriage Ordinance 1996 as amended in 2017 state:

The marriage of same-sex couples is lawful [and]...a same-sex marriage solemnised under this Ordinance has and must be treated in the same manner and afforded the same status as a marriage between a man and a woman.

30 March 2017 vote in the Legislative Assembly of the Falkland Islands
Voted for	Voted against
7: Jan Cheek; Roger Edwards; Barry Elsby; Ian Hansen; Michael Poole; Phyl Rendell; Gavin Short	1: Mike Summers

== Adoption and family planning ==
The 2017 law reform relating to marriage and civil partnership included a new provision to the island's Marriage Ordinance stating that "a parent in a civil partnership...has the same rights and responsibilities towards a child as a parent to a child in a marriage". The official reasons attached to the amendments to the ordinance included a note stating that "...parents to a child may be two mothers or two fathers".

There are no known IVF/assisted reproductive technology services available for same-sex couples.

== Discrimination protections ==
Article 16 of the 2008 Constitution bans discrimination based on sexual orientation:

In this section, the expression "discriminatory" means affording different treatment to different persons on any grounds such as sex, sexual orientation, race, colour, language, religion, political or other opinion, national or social origin, association with a national minority, property, birth or other status.

The Crimes Ordinance 2014 provides for fines or imprisonment of up to 7 years for a person who "uses threatening words or behaviour, or displays any written material which is threatening, and intends by doing so to stir up religious hatred, or hatred on the grounds of sexual orientation". The Criminal Procedure and Evidence Ordinance 2014 allows courts to treat an offence committed on the basis of the victim's sexual orientation as an aggravative factor. Moreover, the Prisons Ordinance 2017 requires prison staff to treat all prisoners equally without distinction to, among other categories, sexual orientation, and the Communications Ordinance 2017 forbids the distribution of material which incites hatred or discrimination on the basis of sexual orientation.

== Gender identity and expression ==
Although the UK's Gender Recognition Act 2004 does not extend to the Falkland Islands, the Criminal Procedure and Evidence Ordinance 2014 states that "at law, the gender of an individual is his or her gender as registered at birth, unless the person possesses a gender recognition certificate issued under section 9 of the UK Gender Recognition Act 2004, in which case the person's gender is the acquired gender."

== Summary table ==
Same-sex sexual activity legal	Yes (Since 1989)
Equal age of consent (16)	Yes (Since 2005)
Anti-discrimination laws in employment	Yes (Since 2008)
Anti-discrimination laws in the provision of goods and services	Yes (Since 2008)
Anti-discrimination laws in all other areas (incl. indirect discrimination, hate speech)	Yes (Since 2008)
Recognition of same-sex unions (e.g. civil union)	Yes (Since 2017)
Same-sex marriage	Yes (Since 2017)
Stepchild adoption by same-sex couples	Yes (Since 2017)
Joint adoption by same-sex couples	Yes (Since 2017)
LGBTQ people allowed to serve openly in the military	Yes (Since 2000; UK responsible for defence)
Right to change legal gender	Yes (Since 2014)
Gender self-identification	No
Legal recognition of non-binary gender	No
Access to IVF for lesbians	
Commercial surrogacy for gay male couples	No (Banned for heterosexual couples as well)
MSMs allowed to donate blood	

== See also ==
- Same-sex marriage in the Falkland Islands
- LGBTQ rights in the Americas
