= List of Falkland Islands by-elections =

This is a list of by-elections to the Legislative Assembly and the Legislative Council of the Falkland Islands. The Legislative Council of the Falkland Islands was founded on 13 November 1845, originally as an entirely appointed body. The first elections to the council took place in 1949. The Legislative Assembly replaced the Legislative Council with the implementation of the new Constitution on 1 January 2009.

The Legislative Assembly consists of eight elected members, five from Stanley and three from Camp. Under section 32(2) of the constitution, if an elected member of the Legislative Assembly vacates their seat for any reason other than a dissolution of the Assembly, there is a by-election to fill the empty seat. The by-election must be held within 70 days of the vacancy occurring, unless the Assembly is due to be dissolved within 126 days.

== Legislative Assembly ==
The first election to the newly constituted Legislative Assembly took place on 5 November 2009 and the assembly was dissolved on 17 October 2013 in preparation for the 2013 general election.

=== 2023 Camp ===
Ian Hansen, MLA for Camp, resigned from the Legislative Assembly on 19 July 2023 due to health issues. His seat was filled by Jack Ford in a by-election on 21 September 2023.

2023 Camp by-election
List	Candidates	Votes	Of total (%)	± from prev.
Nonpartisan	Jack Ford	122	65.59	N/A
Nonpartisan	Gary Webb	63	33.87	N/A
Rejected ballots		1	0.54	N/A
Turnout		186	75.61%	

=== December 2011 Stanley ===
Emma Edwards, MLA for Stanley, resigned from the Legislative Assembly on 21 October 2011 following her decision to leave the Falklands. Her seat was filled by Dr Barry Elsby in a by-election on 15 December 2011.

Stanley by-election, December 2011
List	Candidates	Votes	Of total (%)	± from prev.
Nonpartisan	Barry Elsby	462	65.2	N/A
Nonpartisan	John Birmingham	95	13.4	+7.7
Nonpartisan	Steve Vincent	94	13.3	N/A
Nonpartisan	Norman Besley-Clark	45	6.4	+0.07
Rejected ballots		12	0.02	N/A
Turnout		708	51%	

=== 2011 Camp ===
Bill Luxton, MLA for Camp, resigned from the Legislative Assembly on 4 November 2011 due to his prolonged absence from the Falklands, which was increasing the workload of the other MLAs. The seat was filled by Ian Hansen, who was the only candidate when nominations closed on 30 November 2011.

Camp by-election, 2011
List	Candidates	Votes	Of total (%)	± from prev.
Nonpartisan	Ian Hansen	Uncontested	N/A	N/A

=== June 2011 Stanley ===
Glenn Ross, MLA for Stanley, resigned from the Legislative Assembly on 26 April 2011 in order to concentrate on his work at the islands' power station. His seat was filled by former MLA, Mike Summers in a by-election on 23 June 2011.

Stanley by-election, June 2011
List	Candidates	Votes	Of total (%)	± from prev.
Nonpartisan	Mike Summers	259	38.3	+29.1
Nonpartisan	Steve Vincent	177	26.2	N/A
Nonpartisan	Norman Besley-Clark	96	14.2	+8.5
Nonpartisan	John Birmingham	87	12.9	+7.2
Nonpartisan	Ian Hansen	49	7.2	N/A
Rejected ballots		8	0.01	N/A
Turnout		676	49%	

== Legislative Council ==
=== 2008 Stanley ===
A by-election took place in the Stanley constituency on 3 January 2008 after the incumbent councillor, Richard Davies, became Chief Medical Officer. There was controversy over the circumstances that led to the by-election, as Richard Davies had been advised by the Government that he could take on the office of Chief Medical Officer without forfeiting his seat in the Legislative Council. However, this was later deemed to be unconstitutional, forcing Davies to give up his seat. Davies sought re-election at the by-election, but lost out to John Birmingham. This was the last election to the Legislative Council before it was reconstituted as the Legislative Assembly on 1 January 2009.

Stanley by-election, 2008
List	Candidates	Votes	Of total (%)	± from prev.
Nonpartisan	John Birmingham	210	34.4	N/A
Nonpartisan	Richard Davies	182	29.8	N/A
Nonpartisan	Roger Edwards	133	21.8	N/A
Nonpartisan	James Peck	85	13.9	N/A
Turnout		610		

=== 2003 Camp ===
A by-election took place in the Camp constituency on 6 November 2003 following the resignation of the incumbent councillor, Philip Miller. The seat was filled by Ian Hansen.

Camp by-election, 2003
List	Candidates	Votes	Of total (%)	± from prev.
Nonpartisan	Ian Hansen	96	42.7	N/A
Nonpartisan	Eric Goss	66	29.3	N/A
Nonpartisan	Lewis Clifton	63	28.0	N/A
Turnout		225		

=== 1996 Stanley ===
A by-election took place in the Stanley constituency in October 1996 following the resignation of the incumbent councillor, John Cheek. The seat was filled by Mike Summers.

Stanley by-election, 1996
List	Candidates	Votes	Of total (%)	± from prev.
Nonpartisan	Mike Summers	367	70.2	N/A
Nonpartisan	Elvio "Migs" Cofre	108	20.7	N/A
Nonpartisan	June Besley-Clark	48	9.2	N/A
Turnout		523		

=== 1994 Stanley ===
A by-election took place in the Stanley constituency on 15 December 1994 following the resignation of the incumbent councillor, Charles Keenleyside. The seat was filled by John Birmingham.

Stanley by-election, 1994
List	Candidates	Votes	Of total (%)	± from prev.
Nonpartisan	John Birmingham	199	41.4	N/A
Nonpartisan	Terry Betts	139	28.9	N/A
Nonpartisan	John Allan	60	12.5	N/A
Nonpartisan	John Pollard	51	10.6	N/A
Nonpartisan	John Halford	23	4.8	N/A
Nonpartisan	Jan Cheek	9	1.9	N/A
Turnout		481		

=== 1987 Stanley ===
A by-election took place in the Stanley constituency on 29 January 1987 following the resignation of the incumbent councillor, Norma Edwards. The seat was filled by Terry Betts.

Stanley by-election, 1987
List	Candidates	Votes	Of total (%)	± from prev.
Nonpartisan	Terry Betts	201	50.9	N/A
Nonpartisan	Harold Bennett	146	37.0	N/A
Nonpartisan	Rene Rowlands	48	12.2	N/A
Turnout		395		

=== 1986 Camp ===
A by-election was called for the Camp constituency on 16 April 1986 following the resignation of the incumbent councillor, Timothy John Durose Miller. Miller sought re-election himself, but lost to Eric Miller Goss.

Camp by-election, 1986
List	Candidates	Votes	Of total (%)	± from prev.
Nonpartisan	Eric Miller Goss	112	37.3	N/A
Nonpartisan	Timothy John Durose Miller	75	25.0	N/A
Nonpartisan	Kevin Seaton Kilmartin	68	22.7	N/A
Nonpartisan	Ronald Eric Binnie	45	15.0	N/A
Turnout		300		

=== 1984 Stanley ===
A by-election was called for the Stanley constituency on 5 November 1984 following the resignation of the incumbent councillor, Terence John Peck. The seat was filled by Harold Bennett.

Stanley by-election, 1984
List	Candidates	Votes	Of total (%)	± from prev.
Nonpartisan	Harold Bennett	179	49.7	N/A
Nonpartisan	Phillip John Middleton	93	25.8	N/A
Nonpartisan	Terence Severine Betts	88	24.4	N/A
Turnout		360		

=== 1980 West Falkland ===
A by-election was called for the West Falkland constituency in 1980 following the resignation of the incumbent councillor, Derek Stanley Evans. The seat was filled by Lionel Geoffrey Blake.

West Falkland by-election, 1980
List	Candidates	Votes	Of total (%)	± from prev.
Nonpartisan	Lionel Geoffrey Blake	64	58.2	N/A
Nonpartisan	Peter Charles Robertson	46	41.8	N/A
Turnout		110		

=== 1962 Stanley ===
A by-election was called for the Stanley constituency in 1962 following the death of the incumbent councillor, Arthur Leslie Hardy, on 6 February 1962. The seat was filled by John Richard Rowlands.

Stanley by-election, 1962
List	Candidates	Votes	Of total (%)	± from prev.
Nonpartisan	John Richard Rowlands	202	68.5	N/A
Nonpartisan	Brian Ormonde Barnes	93	31.5	N/A
Turnout		295		
