= Richard Davies (doctor) =

Falkland Islands doctor and politician, and New Zealand doctor and statesman

His Excellency The Honourable Richard Davies CStJ CF
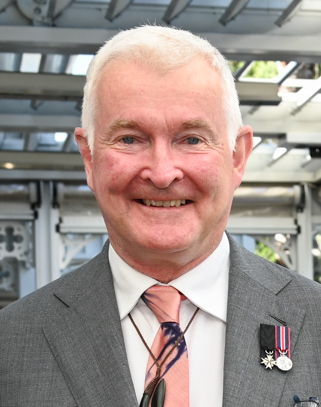
- Davies in 2025

Viceregal consort of New Zealand
- Incumbent
- Assumed office 21 October 2021
- Governor-General: Cindy Kiro
- Preceded by: David Gascoigne

Member of the Falkland Islands Legislative Council for Stanley
- In office 17 November 2005 – 19 November 2007 Serving with Andrea Clausen, Richard Cockwell, Janet Robertson, Mike Summers
- Preceded by: Jan Cheek
- Succeeded by: John Birmingham

Personal details
- Born: Richard Andrew Davies; 1959 (age 66–67) Cannock, Staffordshire, England
- Spouse(s): Sarah Griffiths; Cindy Kiro
- Children: 2 children, 2 stepchildren
- Education: University of Oxford; Queen's University Belfast

Richard Andrew Davies CStJ CF (born 1959) is a British-born New Zealand doctor. He is the viceregal consort of New Zealand as the husband of Dame Cindy Kiro, who has been the governor-general since 21 October 2021. Davies previously served as a member of the Falkland Islands Legislative Council from 2005 to 2007, and represented the Falkland Islands at the United Nations Special Committee on Decolonization meetings in 2006 and 2007.

== Early life and family ==
Davies was born in Cannock, Staffordshire, England, in 1959, the son of Peter Richard Davies and Margaret "Tiggy" Davies (née Allen). His father was ordained at Lichfield Cathedral in 1958, and served as curate at St Chad's, Cannock, for three years. The family moved to Kenya where Peter Davies taught and was chaplain at the Prince of Wales (later Nairobi) School for 13 years. Richard Davies was educated at Marlborough College as a boarder in C3 House from 1972 to 1977, and the family returned permanently to Britain in 1974 when Peter Davies was appointed as a teacher and chaplain at Bedford School.

After studying philosophy and psychology at the University of Oxford from 1979 to 1981, Davies spent two years in the merchant navy. He subsequently undertook medical studies at Queen's University Belfast, graduating MB BCh BAO in 1988.

Davies trained as a junior doctor at Withybush General Hospital in Haverfordwest, Pembrokeshire, Wales, and trained in general practice in Ipswich, Suffolk, England, and subsequently worked there as a general practitioner. In 1993, he married Sarah Griffiths, a hospice nurse, in Ipswich.

== Falkland Islands ==
Davies saw a job advertisement for a medical officer in the Falkland Islands, and in July 1996 he and his wife sailed from Britain on their 36-foot steel yacht, Cowrie. After visiting the Azores, the Canary Islands, Cape Verde, and Brazil, they arrived in the Falklands in February 1997, and settled in the capital, Stanley. Their first son was born a few weeks after their arrival, and their second son was born in 1999.

Davies' work as a medical officer included general practice, emergency medicine, evacuations and looking after in-patients at the hospital.

At the 2005 Falkland Islands general election, Davies stood for a seat on the Falkland Islands Legislative Council in the five-member Stanley constituency, and was elected as the highest-polling candidate. He was given the land use, heritage, housing, and environment portfolios.

In 2006 and 2007, Davies was one of the Falkland Islands' two representatives at the annual meeting of the UN Special Commission on Decolonization. At the 2006 meeting, Davies opined that a resolution calling for dialogue between the British and Argentinian governments regarding the status of the Falklands "would accomplish nothing" and that it was "an annual ritual which ignored the rights of the people of the Falklands and betrayed their right to self-determination". He further said:

"Argentina’s claim of territorial integrity had no historical, legal or other basis. The claim that the people of the Falkland Islands had no political rights was unjust and contrary to the principles on which the United Nations was based. The people had made a free and informed choice to associate themselves with a Member State."

In his presentation at the 2007 meeting of the UN Special Commission on Decolonization, Davies reiterated the view that the territorial claim by Argentina over the Falkland Islands lacked any legal legitimacy, and that the political future of the territory should be determined in accordances with the wishes of the islanders themselves. He called on the commission to censure Argentina for the imposition of economic sanctions against the Falkland Islands, and stated that British sovereignty over the Falklands did not imply a colonial relationship. Davies emphasised that Falkland Islanders were strongly opposed to Argentinian sovereignty over the islands and wished to maintain their constitutional link with Britain. Nevertheless, he stated that the Falkland Islands were committed to improving relations with Argentina, and had demonstrated this by inviting the families of Argentinian military personnel killed in the 1982 Falklands War to hold a commemoration on the islands.

On 19 November 2007, Davies' seat on the Legislative Council was declared vacant by the governor, Alan Huckle, following a ruling that it was unconstitutional for Davies to hold the seat. On three occasions during his term as a councillor, Davies had been acting chief medical officer. He had previously been given advice by officials that a constitutional prohibition on the holder of a government post serving as a legislative councillor did not apply as he was only undertaking the post of chief medical officer in an acting capacity. Davies stood for re-election in the resulting by-election, but was unsuccessful, polling second, behind John Birmingham.

== New Zealand ==
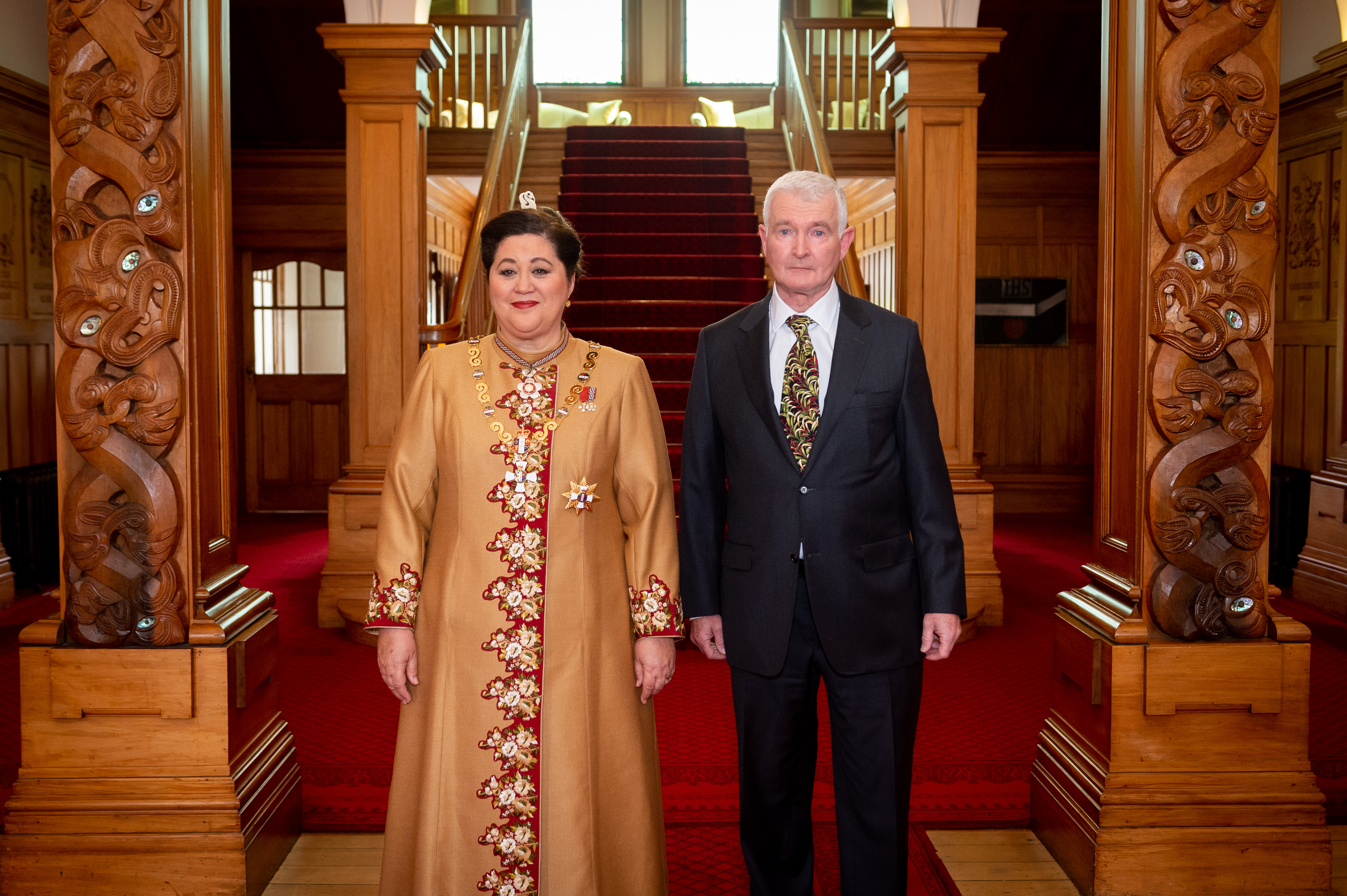
Davies and Kiro departing Government House, Wellington, on their way to Parliament for Kiro's swearing-in as governor-general on 21 October 2021

After 15 years in the Falkland Islands, Davies and his family moved to New Zealand. He subsequently remarried to Cindy Kiro, and became a stepfather to Kiro's two sons.

From 2014, Davies worked as a general practitioner at the Calder Medical Centre, part of the Auckland City Mission, providing care to vulnerable communities including the homeless and people dealing with mental health and addiction issues. In 2018, Davies was awarded a Churchill Fellowship, which allowed him to travel to the United Kingdom where he visited and observed general practice clinics for homeless people and other vulnerable groups, to inform the delivery of medical services to those groups in New Zealand.

On 21 October 2021, Davies' wife, Dame Cindy Kiro, was sworn in as the governor-general of New Zealand.

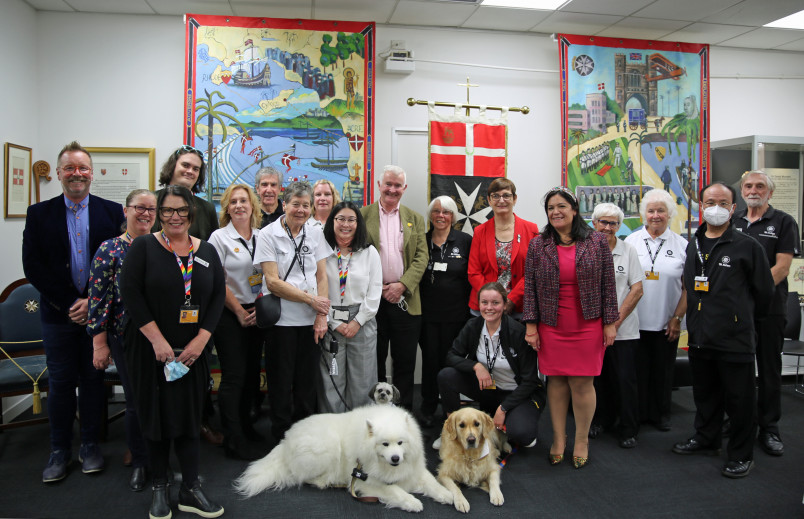
Davies (centre) visiting the St John Archives in Auckland on 24 May 2022 in his capacity as patron for community health

On 4 January 2022, Davies was appointed an Officer of the Order of St John. In March 2022, he took up the role of patron of St John New Zealand's community health services, and two months later he undertook an induction tour of a number of St John's community activities in the Auckland area. On 12 February 2024, Davies was promoted to Commander of the Order of St John.
