= 1997 Falkland Islands general election =

- 9 October 1997

All 8 members to the Legislative Council
	Majority party
Party	Nonpartisan
Seats won	8

The Falkland Islands general election of 1997 was held on Thursday 9 October 1997 to elect members to the Legislative Council. Eight Councillors were elected through universal suffrage using block voting, five from the Stanley constituency and three from the Camp constituency.

It was the first election to take place after a constitutional amendment came into force, which redistributed the representation in the constituencies, giving an additional seat to Stanley and removing one from Camp. The amendment also modified voter eligibility.

== Results ==
Candidates in bold were elected. Candidates in italic were incumbents.

=== Stanley constituency ===
Stanley result
List	Candidates	Votes	Of total (%)	± from prev.
Nonpartisan	**Jan Cheek**	627	19.2	N/A
Nonpartisan	**Mike Summers**	559	17.1	N/A
Nonpartisan	**Lewis Clifton**	558	17.1	N/A
Nonpartisan	**John Birmingham**	472	14.5	N/A
Nonpartisan	**Sharon Halford**	450	13.8	+5.6
Nonpartisan	Ben Claxton	292	8.9	+4.1
Nonpartisan	June Besley-Clark	166	5.1	N/A
Nonpartisan	A. Jones	98	3.0	N/A
Nonpartisan	W. Davies	42	1.3	N/A
Turnout		3264		

=== Camp constituency ===
Camp result
List	Candidates	Votes	Of total (%)	± from prev.
Nonpartisan	**Bill Luxton**	203	28.2	+5.2
Nonpartisan	**Richard Cockwell**	182	25.3	N/A
Nonpartisan	**Norma Edwards**	174	24.2	+10.5
Nonpartisan	Eric Goss	74	10.3	−4.2
Nonpartisan	Richard Stevens	87	12.1	−1.5
Turnout		720		
