= 2017 Falkland Islands general election =

- 9 November 2017

All 8 members to the legislative assembly 5 seats needed for a majority
	Majority party
Party	Nonpartisan
Seats won	8
- Winning and losing candidates by constituency.

The Falkland Islands general election of 2017 was held on Thursday 9 November 2017 to elect all eight members of the Legislative Assembly (five from the Stanley constituency and three from the Camp constituency) through universal suffrage using block voting, with each Stanley constituent having up to 5 votes and each Camp constituent having up to 3 votes. Voter turnout was 80% in Stanley and 86% in Camp.

It was the third election since the new Constitution came into force replacing the Legislative Council (which had existed since 1845) with the Legislative Assembly. As no political parties are active in the Falklands, all the candidates stood as Independents. Incumbent members Jan Cheek, Michael Poole, Phyllis Rendell and Mike Summers did not put their names forward for reelection. Only three members of the previous assembly won reelection, with Ian Hansen being the only incumbent member to increase his percentage of the vote.

== Campaign ==
Under section 32 of the Constitution of the Falkland Islands, a general election did not need to take place until 19 January 2018. However, in August 2017 the Legislative Assembly announced that an early general election was being planned for 9 November 2017 (almost exactly four years after the previous general election of 2013). The closing date for voter registration and applications for postal and proxy votes was noon FKST on 19 October 2017 and the deadline for nomination as a candidate in the election was 16:15 FKST on 20 October 2017.

As well as attending hustings, each candidate gave a fifteen-minute televised interview to former member of the Legislative Assembly, Richard Cockwell, which was broadcast on the Falkland Islands Television Service.

== Results ==
Incumbent members are in italics.

=== Stanley constituency ===
Stanley
List	Candidates	Votes	Of total (%)	± from prev.
Nonpartisan	Roger Kenneth Spink	651	14.98	N/A
Nonpartisan	Leona Lucila Vidal Roberts	559	12.86	N/A
Nonpartisan	Mark John Pollard	534	12.29	N/A
Nonpartisan	Stacy John Bragger	476	10.95	N/A
Nonpartisan	Barry Elsby	404	9.30	−9.50
Nonpartisan	Gavin Phillip Short	382	8.79	−8.98
Nonpartisan	David Patrick Peck	376	8.65	N/A
Nonpartisan	Corina Rose Ashbridge	259	5.96	N/A
Nonpartisan	Louise Ellis	232	5.34	N/A
Nonpartisan	John Birmingham	221	5.09	−0.91
Nonpartisan	Jason Lewis	97	2.23	N/A
Nonpartisan	Marvin Thomas Clarke	90	2.07	N/A
Nonpartisan	Carole Lynda Jane Buckland	65	1.50	N/A
Turnout		4346	80	+4.6

=== Camp constituency ===
Camp
List	Candidates	Votes	Of total (%)	± from prev.
Nonpartisan	Ian Hansen	149	27.29	+8.18
Nonpartisan	Teslyn Siobhan Barkman	139	25.46	N/A'"`UNIQ−−ref−0000003B−QINU`"'
Nonpartisan	Roger Anthony Edwards	130	23.81	−0.19
Nonpartisan	Benjamin William Cockwell	128	23.44	N/A
Turnout		546	86	+0.8
