= Bill Luxton =

Falkland Islands politician

The Honourable Bill Luxton

Member of the Falkland Islands Legislative Assembly for the Camp
- In office 5 November 2009 – 4 November 2011
- Preceded by: Richard Stevens
- Succeeded by: Ian Hansen

Member of the Falkland Islands Legislative Council for Camp
- In office 12 October 1989 – 22 November 2001
- Preceded by: Anthony Blake
- Succeeded by: Norma Edwards

Personal details
- Born: William Robert Luxton; 9 September 1940 Chartres, Falkland Islands
- Died: 11 February 2024 (aged 83)
- Party: Nonpartisan
- Domestic partner: Grizelda Cockwell
- Children: 3

William Robert Luxton (9 September 1940 – 11 February 2024) was a Falkland Islander farmer and politician who served as a Member of the Legislative Assembly for the Camp constituency from the 2009 general election until his resignation in 2011. Luxton was also a Member of the Legislative Council from 1989 to 2001, and served on the Executive Council of the Falkland Islands in the 1980s.

== Life ==
Luxton was born in the Falkland Islands and educated in England. After working on a farm in Romney Marsh he moved back to the islands to manage his family's farm at Chartres. In 1982 Argentina invaded and occupied the Falklands for 74 days during which time Luxton was identified by the Argentine military junta as a potential troublemaker. Along with his wife, Patricia, and their children, Luxton was deported to the UK where he became notable for giving numerous interviews about his experiences with the Argentine military. Luxton and his family returned to the islands at the end of the Falklands War.

=== Political career ===
Luxton's portfolios in the Falkland Islands Government included Civil Aviation, Development Corporation, Aquaculture and Rural Development. Luxton was noted for his strong criticism of Argentina's policy on the Falkland Islands. Luxton resigned from the Legislative Assembly in 2011 due to his prolonged absence from the Falklands, which was increasing the workload on other MLAs. He was replaced by Ian Hansen in an uncontested by-election.

Luxton died in February 2024.
