= Richard Stevens (Falkland Islands politician) =

Falkland Islands politician

The Honourable Richard Stevens

Member of the Falkland Islands Legislative Assembly for Camp
- In office 17 November 2005 – 5 November 2009
- Preceded by: Norma Edwards
- Succeeded by: Bill Luxton

Member of the Falkland Islands Legislative Council for Camp
- In office 14 October 1993 – 9 October 1997
- Preceded by: Kevin Kilmartin
- Succeeded by: Richard Cockwell

Personal details
- Born: 1955 (age 70–71) Plymouth, Devon
- Party: Nonpartisan
- Spouse: Toni

Richard James Stevens (born 1955) is a British-born Falkland Islands teacher and politician who served as a Member of the Legislative Assembly for the Camp constituency from 2005 until 2009. Stevens was elected as a Member of the Legislative Council, which was reconstitution into the Legislative Assembly with the implementation of the 2009 Constitution.

Stevens was born in Devon and grew up in Kent before moving to the Falkland Islands in 1977 to work as a teacher. In 1984 he married Toni with whom he bought a farm in San Carlos.

He was first elected to the Legislative Council in 1993, but lost his seat four years later. Stevens returned to the Legislative Council at the 2005 general election, but again lost his seat in the 2009 general election.
