= 2001 Falkland Islands general election =

- 22 November 2001

All 8 members to the Legislative Council
	Majority party
Party	Nonpartisan
Seats won	8

The Falkland Islands general election of 2001 was held on Thursday 22 November 2001 to elect members to the Legislative Council through universal suffrage using block voting. Chief Executive Michael Blanch acted as Chief Counting Officer.

The election took place on the same day as a referendum on merging Stanley and the Camp into a single electoral constituency elected by proportional representation.

At the start of the campaign the Democratic Association, one of the only political parties in the history of the Falkland Islands, had suggested it would field as many as eight candidates. However, all candidates in the election stood as nonpartisans. The Democratic Association strongly opposed the 1999 Treaty allowing Argentine Nationals to visit the Falklands.

== Election results ==
=== Stanley constituency ===
Stanley result
List	Candidates	Votes	Of total (%)	± from prev.
Nonpartisan	Michael Summers	541	16.89	−0.21
Nonpartisan	Stephen Luxton	407	12.70	N/A
Nonpartisan	John Birmingham	405	12.64	−1.86
Nonpartisan	Jan Cheek	356	11.11	−8.09
Nonpartisan	Richard Cockwell	334	10.42	N/A
Nonpartisan	Eric Goss	291	9.08	N/A
Nonpartisan	Ian Doherty	283	8.83	N/A
Nonpartisan	Sharon Halford	231	7.21	−6.59
Nonpartisan	June Besley-Clark	135	4.21	−0.89
Nonpartisan	Rod Tuckwood	120	3.75	N/A
Nonpartisan	Kevin Ormond	101	3.15	N/A
Turnout		823	68.7	

=== Camp constituency ===
Camp result
List	Candidates	Votes	Of total (%)	± from prev.
Nonpartisan	Norma Edwards	179	26.56	+2.36
Nonpartisan	Roger Edwards	168	24.93	N/A
Nonpartisan	Philip Miller	92	13.65	N/A
Nonpartisan	Ian Hansen	89	13.20	N/A
Nonpartisan	Richard Stevens	86	12.76	+0.66
Nonpartisan	Christopher May	38	5.64	N/A
Nonpartisan	Robin Goodwin	22	3.26	N/A
Turnout		250	82.2	
