= 2013 Falkland Islands general election =

- 7 November 2013

All 8 members to the legislative assembly 5 seats needed for a majority
	Majority party
Party	Nonpartisan
Seats won	8
Speaker before election
Keith Biles
Elected Speaker
Keith Biles

The Falkland Islands general election of 2013 was held on Thursday 7 November 2013 to elect all eight members of the Legislative Assembly (five from the Stanley constituency and three from the Camp constituency) through universal suffrage using block voting, with each Stanley constituent having up to 5 votes and each Camp constituent having up to 3 votes. A total of 1,046 ballots (4,750 votes) were cast in Stanley, representing a turn-out of 75.4%, and 242 ballots (675 votes) in Camp, representing a turn-out of 85.5%. As no political parties are active in the Falklands, all the candidates stood as Independents. The Chief Executive of the Falkland Islands, Keith Padgett, acted as returning officer. It was the second election since the new Constitution came into force replacing the Legislative Council (which had existed since 1845) with the Legislative Assembly.

For the first time, elected candidates would be paid a salary, rather than just expenses, and be expected to work full-time, giving up whatever jobs or business interests they may have previously held. This led to criticism from some Islanders that potential candidates had been put off from standing as they didn't want to give up their jobs.

All but two members of the previous Legislative Assembly won re-election (Camp MLA Sharon Halford lost her seat and Stanley MLA Dick Sawle did not stand for re-election). Michael Poole, one of the new intake, became the first member of the islands' legislature to have been born after the Falklands War and received the highest number of votes of a candidate in the history of the islands.

== Campaign ==
On 29 July 2013 the Executive Council announced that election day had been scheduled for 7 November. In preparation for the election, the Legislative Assembly was dissolved by the Governor on 26 September 2013. Nominations for candidates opened on the day of the dissolution and closed on 17 October. Eleven candidates stood in Stanley and five in Camp.

Each candidate made a two-minute televised broadcast on the Falkland Islands Television Service to set out their manifestos. Hustings were held in late October and early November, with a north–south air-link and better facilities for tourism being the main issues debated.

== Results ==
Incumbent members are in italics.

=== Stanley constituency ===
Stanley
List	Candidates	Votes	Of total (%)	± from prev.
Nonpartisan	Michael Poole	957	20.15	NA
Nonpartisan	Barry Elsby	893	18.80	NA'"`UNIQ−−ref−0000004C−QINU`"'
Nonpartisan	Gavin Short	844	17.77	+6.49
Nonpartisan	Mike Summers	719	15.14	+10.48'"`UNIQ−−ref−0000004D−QINU`"'
Nonpartisan	Jan Cheek	333	7.01	−3.38
Nonpartisan	Teslyn Barkman	292	6.15	NA
Nonpartisan	John Birmingham	285	6.00	+0.25
Nonpartisan	Norman Besley-Clark	148	3.12	−2.60
Nonpartisan	Candy Blackley	138	2.91	NA
Nonpartisan	Lynda Buckland	96	2.02	NA
Nonpartisan	Faith Felton	45	0.95	NA
Rejected ballots		3	0.003	NA
Turnout		4,750 (Note: A total of 1,046 ballots were cast in the Stanley constituency and each voter could vote for up to five candidates.)	75.4	−0.2

=== Camp constituency ===
Camp
List	Candidates	Votes	Of total (%)	± from prev.
Nonpartisan	Phyllis Rendell	204	30.22	NA
Nonpartisan	Roger Edwards	162	24.00	+0.80
Nonpartisan	Ian Hansen	129	19.11	+0.53'"`UNIQ−−ref−00000054−QINU`"'
Nonpartisan	Melanie Gilding	124	18.37	NA
Nonpartisan	Sharon Halford	56	8.30	−14.74
Rejected ballots		1	0.002	NA
Turnout		675 (Note: A total of 242 ballots were cast in the Camp constituency and each voter could vote for up to three candidates.)	85.2	−4.1
