= 2005 Falkland Islands general election =

- 17 November 2005

All 8 members to the Legislative Council
	Majority party
Party	Nonpartisan
Seats won	8

The Falkland Islands general election of 2005 was held on Thursday 17 November 2005 to elect members to the Legislative Council. It would be the last general election in the Falkland Islands before the new constitution came into force, which replaced the Legislative Council with the Legislative Assembly. Chief Executive Chris Simpkins acted as Returning Officer.

Eight Councillors were elected through universal suffrage using block voting, five from the Stanley constituency and three from the Camp constituency. Each elector in Stanley could vote for five candidates, and in Camp each elector could vote for three candidates.

== Results ==
Candidates in bold were elected. Candidates in italic were incumbents.

=== Stanley constituency ===
Stanley result
List	Candidates	Votes	Of total (%)	± from prev.
Nonpartisan	**Richard Davies**	546	15.91	N/A
Nonpartisan	**Mike Summers**	477	13.90	−2.99
Nonpartisan	**Andrea Clausen**	466	13.58	N/A
Nonpartisan	**Richard Cockwell**	302	8.80	−1.62
Nonpartisan	**Janet Robertson**	299	8.71	N/A
Nonpartisan	John Fowler	276	8.04	N/A
Nonpartisan	Eric Goss	276	8.04	−1.04
Nonpartisan	Jan Cheek	275	8.02	−3.09
Nonpartisan	Mike Forrest	261	7.61	N/A
Nonpartisan	John Birmingham	240	6.99	−5.65
Nonpartisan	Philip Middleton	179	5.22	N/A
Nonpartisan	Kevin Ormond	110	3.21	+0.06
Turnout		3,431	69	

=== Camp constituency ===
Camp result
List	Candidates	Votes	Of total (%)	± from prev.
Nonpartisan	**Ian Hansen**	188	30.08	+16.88
Nonpartisan	**Mike Rendell**	139	22.24	N/A
Nonpartisan	**Richard Stevens**	121	19.36	+6.6
Nonpartisan	Roger Edwards	91	14.56	−10.37
Nonpartisan	Philip Miller	86	13.76	+0.11
Turnout		625		
