= Gavin Short =

Falkland Islands politician (born 1962)

The Honourable Gavin Short
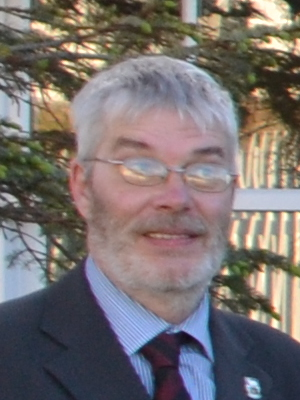

Member of the Falkland Islands Legislative Assembly for Stanley
- In office 4 November 2021 – 31 October 2025
- Preceded by: Barry Elsby
- In office 5 November 2009 – 9 November 2017
- Preceded by: Mike Summers
- Succeeded by: Leona Vidal Roberts
- In office 12 October 1989 – 14 October 1993
- Preceded by: Norma Edwards
- Succeeded by: Sharon Halford

Personal details
- Born: 1962 (age 63–64) Falkland Islands
- Party: Nonpartisan
- Spouse: N/A

Gavin Phillip Short (born 1962) is a Falkland Islands politician who served as a Member of the Legislative Council for Stanley constituency from 1989 to 1993, and as a member of the Legislative Assembly for the same constituency from 2009 to 2017 and again from 2021 to 2025.

As of 2011 Short works for Cable & Wireless and is the Chairman of the General Employees' Union. He is a former member of the Falkland Islands Defence Force and a volunteer fireman.

In November 2009, he was elected to the Legislative Assembly for Stanley, and in June 2010 he represented the Falklands at the annual meeting of the UN Special Committee on Decolonisation in New York City.

Short won re-election in 2013, but lost his seat at the 2017 general election. In 2018 he joined the Falkland Islands Radio Service as a Senior News Correspondent. He returned to the assembly at the next election.

In June 2023, Short and fellow assembly member John Birmingham addressed the United Nations Special Committee on Decolonization to speak about the dispute over the islands’ sovereignty.
