= Executive Council of the Falkland Islands =

Policy making body in Falkland Islands

The Executive Council of the Falkland Islands is the policy making body of the Government of the Falkland Islands, exercising executive power by advising the Governor. It has an equivalent role to that of the Privy Council in the United Kingdom. The first Executive Council for the Falklands was inaugurated on 2 April 1845 by Governor Richard Moody.

== Powers ==
The powers, function, membership and tenure of the Executive Council is prescribed in Chapter V of the Falkland Islands Constitution, which came into force on 1 January 2009. The executive authority of the Falkland Islands is vested in the King, and that authority is exercised on his behalf by the Governor of the Falkland Islands, who acts on the advice of the Executive Council. The constitution gives the governor the power to act against the advice of the Executive Council, however, governors are required to immediately report the matter to His Majesty's Government in the United Kingdom with an explanation.

The Executive Council can set up a Committee to which it can delegate any of its powers, such as the selecting of a Chief Executive, although any decision made by the Committee has to be approved by the Executive Council. Meetings of the Executive Council take place at the discretion of the Governor, although the Governor is obliged to hold a meeting if two or more Councillors request one. Council meetings normally take place monthly.

== Oath or affirmation ==
Under section 64 of the constitution, before taking part in any proceedings of the Executive Council, Councillors must take the oath or affirmation of secrecy. The wording is specified in Annex B to the Constitution:

"I, name, do swear (or solemnly affirm) that I will be a true and faithful Councillor and that I will not, except in the course of my duties as a Councillor or with the authority of the Governor, reveal the business or proceedings of the Executive Council at any meeting of the Council or the nature or contents of any document or any other matter communicated to me in my capacity as a Councillor or for the purposes of any such meeting. So help me God."

== Membership ==
At the first meeting of the Legislative Assembly of the Falkland Islands after every general election, the Legislative Assembly elects three of its members to the Executive Council, of whom at least one must represent a Stanley constituency and at least one must represent a Camp constituency. The term of office for an Executive Council member is twelve months, after which time the Legislative Assembly elects new members to the Council, although Councillors are permitted to seek re-election to the Council as often as they like. Membership of the Council can end early if a Councillor resigns, or if an elected member ceases to also be a member of the Legislative Assembly. An elected Councillor member can be forcibly removed from the Council by a resolution in the Legislative Assembly. Also, membership is revoked automatically if a Councillor is absent for three consecutive Council meetings without permission.

There are also two ex officio members of the Council, the Chief Executive and the Director of Finance of the Falkland Islands, although they are barred from voting in the Council's meetings. The Commander of the British Forces in the South Atlantic Islands and the Attorney General of the Falkland Islands are also permitted to attend Council meetings, although they are not members of the Council and cannot vote. The Governor is also present at meetings of the Executive Council, acting as chairperson.

=== Chair ===
- Colin Martin-Reynolds — Chair of the Executive Council

=== Elected members (2025–2029) ===
- Jack Ford — representing Camp
- Lewis Clifton — representing Stanley
- Cheryl Roberts — elected member of Executive Council

=== Ex officio non-voting members ===
- Andrea Clausen — Chief Executive
- Pat Clunie — Director of Finance

=== Officials permitted to attend, but are not official members ===
- Simon Young — Attorney General
- Brigadier Charlie Harmer — Commander of British Forces South Atlantic Islands (CBFSAI)

== Chairman ==
The Chairman of the Executive Council of the Falkland Islands is the Governor of the Falkland Islands, who presides over meetings of the territory's highest executive body. The Executive Council advises the Governor on the exercise of executive authority and consists of elected members of the Legislative Assembly together with senior officials such as the Chief Executive and Director of Finance. Although the Governor chairs the Council, most domestic government policy is shaped in consultation with the elected members.

The current Chairman is Colin Martin-Reynolds, who became Governor in July 2025. As Governor, he also represents King Charles III in the Falkland Islands and is responsible for constitutional matters, external affairs, defence, and internal security.

=== Chairmen of the Executive Council (2006–Present) ===
- Alan Huckle — Governor (2006–2010)
- Nigel Haywood — Governor (2010–2014)
- Colin Roberts — Governor (2014–2017)
- Nigel Phillips — Governor (2017–2022)
- Alison Blake — Governor (2022–2025)
- Colin Martin-Reynolds — Governor (2025–present)

Under the Falkland Islands Constitution, the Governor serves as Chairman of the Executive Council, except when a Deputy Governor or Acting Governor presides in the Governor's absence.

== Advisory Committee on the Prerogative of Mercy ==
The Governor has the power to grant a pardon to any person concerned in or convicted of an offence, but the Governor can only use this power after consultation with the Advisory Committee on the Prerogative of Mercy. The Committee consist of two elected members of the Legislative Assembly (appointed by the Governor on the advice of the Legislative Assembly), the Chief Executive, the Attorney General and the Chief Medical Officer.

=== Members ===
- Jack Ford — Member of the Legislative Assembly (Camp Constituency)
- Lewis Clifton — Member of the Legislative Assembly (Stanley Constituency)
- Andrea Clausen — Chief Executive
- Simon Young — Attorney General
- Dr Rebecca "Beccy" Edwards — Chief Medical Officer

There is no official chair of the Advisory Committee on the Prerogative of Mercy.

== Executive Council of the Falkland Islands Meetings (2006–Present) ==
=== 21 September 2006 ===
- Chairman: Governor Alan Huckle
- Reason: First Executive Council meeting attended by the newly appointed Governor.
- Outcome: Approved funding support for a wool-marketing cooperative initiative through the Falkland Islands Development Board.

=== 2014 (various meetings) ===
- Chairman: John Duncan (Acting Governor, February–April 2014), then Colin Roberts (Governor, from April 2014)
- Reason: Routine government business, finance, legislation, and policy matters.
- Outcome: Considered and approved various government policies, financial matters, and administrative decisions.

=== 26 July 2017 ===
- Chairman: Governor Colin Roberts
- Reason: Review of committee activities and executive decisions.
- Outcome: Received reports from government committees and reviewed decisions taken under delegated authority.

=== 30 August 2017 ===
- Chairman: Governor Colin Roberts
- Reason: Statistical and administrative matters.
- Outcome: Considered publication of Falkland Islands National Accounts data and related economic information.

=== 13 November 2017 ===
- Chairman: Nigel Phillips
- Reason: Constitution of the new Executive Council following the general election.
- Outcome: Elected Teslyn Barkman, Roger Spink, and Leona Roberts as elected members of the Executive Council.

=== 17 December 2024 ===
- Chairman: Deputy Governor Dave Morgan (Acting as Governor while Alison Blake was absent)
- Reason: Financial governance and government debt management.
- Outcome: Approved the write-off of certain unrecoverable government debts and deferred consideration of waste-management investment proposals.

=== 22 April 2025 ===
- Chairman: Governor Alison Blake
- Reason: Economic development, loan approvals, and review of Members' remuneration.
- Outcome: Approved funding for an IT-services incubation project, ratified Development Corporation loan applications, and reviewed remuneration arrangements for the next Legislative Assembly.

=== 24 June 2025 ===
- Chairman: Governor Alison Blake
- Reason: Review and reform of the Falkland Islands tax system.
- Outcome: Approved the issuance of a tender for a comprehensive review of taxation policy.

=== 22 December 2025 ===
- Chairman: Governor Colin Martin-Reynolds
- Reason: Budget planning and government financial strategy.
- Outcome: Deferred decisions to allow further work on budget principles and long-term financial planning.

=== 27 January 2026 ===
- Chairman: Governor Colin Martin-Reynolds
- Reason: Development of the 2026–27 budget and response to projected fiscal pressures.
- Outcome: Commenced formal budget planning and considered measures to address forecast deficits and reserve fund reductions.

=== 24 February 2026 ===
- Chairman: Governor Colin Martin-Reynolds
- Reason: Financial support arrangements for the Falkland Islands Meat Company (FIMCo).
- Outcome: Approved renewal of a government-backed guarantee for the company's overdraft facility.
