= Mike Summers =

Falkland Islands politician (born 1952)

The Honourable Mike Summers OBE
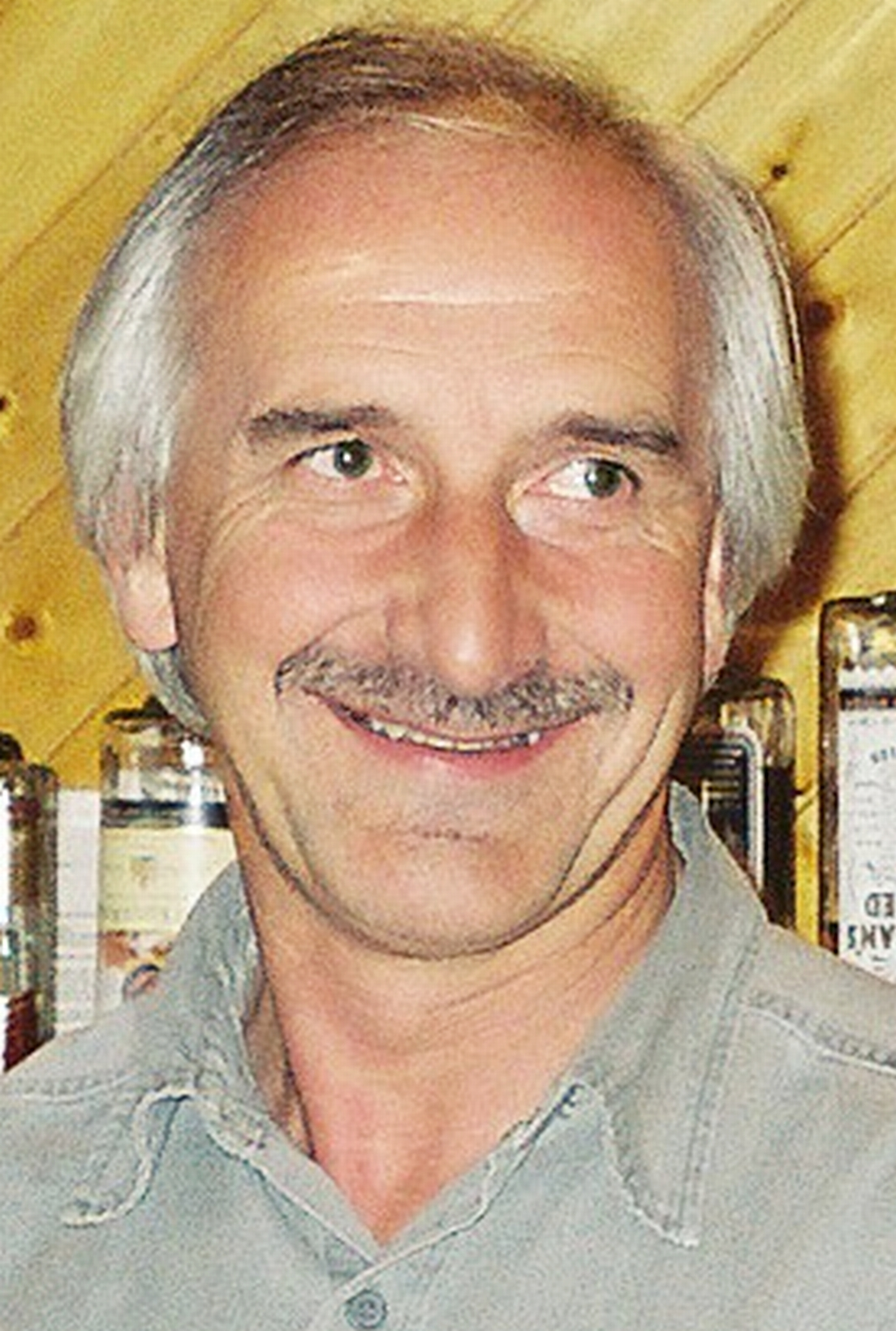
- Mike Summers OBE in 2003

Member of the Falkland Islands Legislative Assembly for Stanley
- In office 23 June 2011 – 9 November 2017
- Preceded by: Glenn Ross
- Succeeded by: Mark Pollard

Member of the Falkland Islands Legislative Council for Stanley
- In office 17 October 1996 – 5 November 2009
- Preceded by: John Cheek
- Succeeded by: Gavin Short

Personal details
- Born: 1952 (age 73–74) Stanley, Falkland Islands
- Party: Nonpartisan
- Spouse: Jacqueline
- Education: Middlesex University

Michael Victor Summers OBE (born 1952) is a Falkland Islands politician who served as a Member of the Legislative Assembly for the Stanley constituency from 2011 to 2017. He was previously a Member of the Legislative Council from 1996–2009.

Summers was born in Stanley and grew up in Port Howard. He moved to the UK at the age of eleven after winning a government scholarship to Shaftesbury Grammar School, a Dorset boarding school. He went on to read business studies at Middlesex University. After university, Summers worked for various construction and engineering companies all round the world, before returning to the Falklands in 1989 when he became general manager of the Falkland Islands Development Corporation. During his time as general manager, Summers negotiated the air link between the Falklands and mainland South America with the Chilean airline LAN, which remains the only commercial airline to fly to the islands.

Summers resigned as general manager in 1996 to pursue a political career. Later that year he was elected in a by-election to the Legislative Council (which was reconstituted as the Legislative Assembly in the 2009 constitution). Summers was re-elected in 1997, 2001 and 2005, but he lost his seat in the 2009 general election.

In 2011, Summers returned to the Legislative Assembly after winning a by-election to fill the seat left vacant by Glenn Ross. At the time of the election, Summers was in the Isle of Wight for the 2011 Island Games in his role as Team Leader of the Falkland Islands Overseas Games Association. In April 2017, Mike Summers was the only member to vote against same-sex marriage, but did vote in favour of civil partnerships.

He won re-election in 2013 but stepped down from the assembly at the 2017 general election.

In September 2019 Summers was elected chair of the Falkland Islands Chamber of Commerce Board following the 2019 Annual General Meeting.
