= Falkland Islands General Employees Union =

Falkland trade union of employees

FIGEU
- Falkland Island General Employees Union
- Founded: 28 October 1943
- Key people: Emma Brook, Chair
- Website: www.falklandsunion.org

The Falkland Island General Employees Union is a trade union representing workers in the Falkland Islands. Originally founded in 1943 as the Falkland Islands Labour Federation, the union mostly represents workers in the agriculture sector.

A number of former leaders and members of the FIGEU have been elected to the Island's General Assembly:

- Terrence S. Betts 1987 by-election for Stanley (constituency).
- Gavin Short elected 1989; 2009 & 2013 for Stanley (constituency).
- Frederick John Cheek elected 1964 for Stanley (constituency).
- Richard Victor Goss elected 1960; 1964 & 1968 for Stanley (constituency).

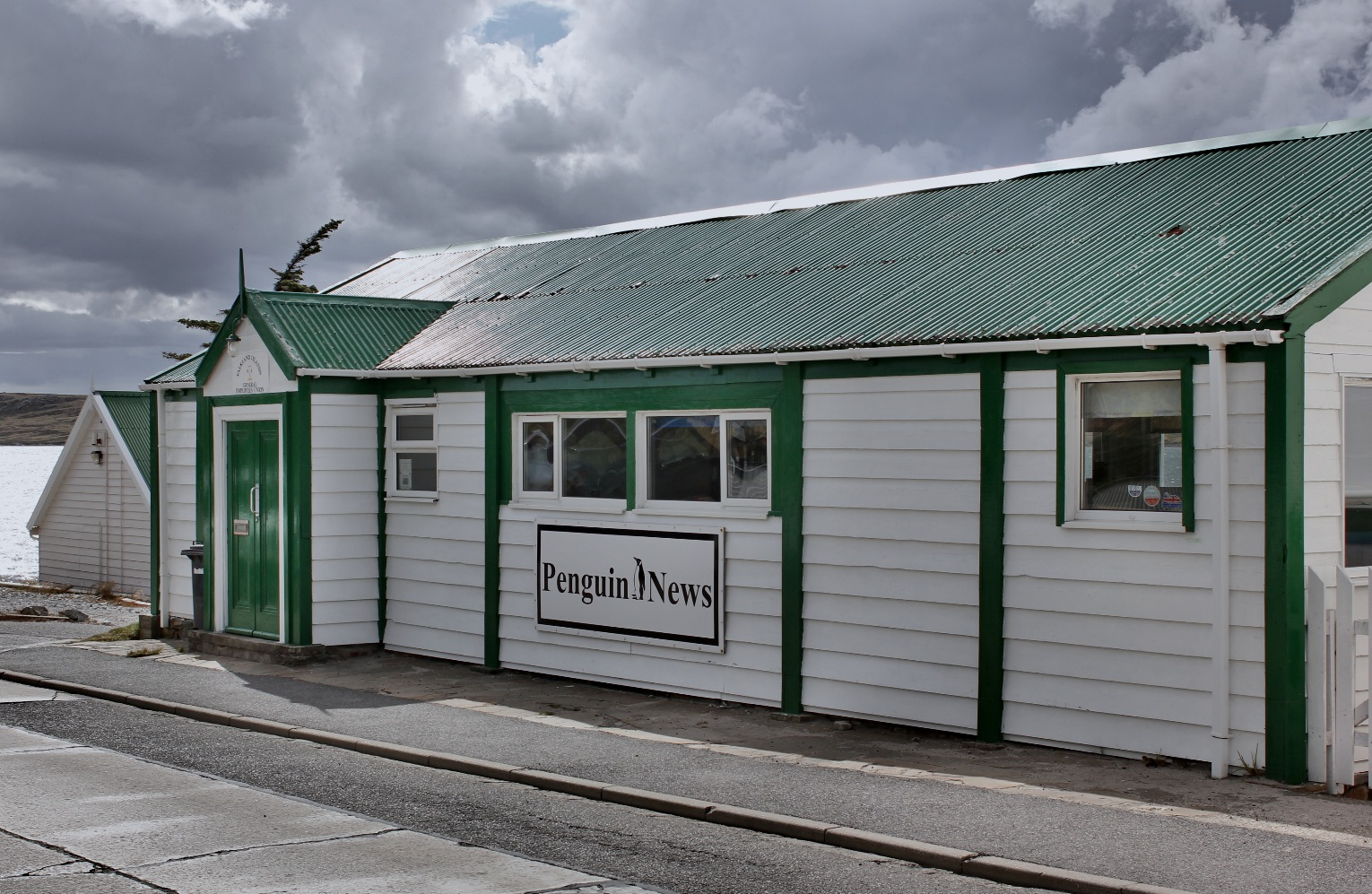
The Penguin News office on Ross Road, Stanley also houses the Falkland Islands General Employees Union

.
