= 2009 Falkland Islands general election =

- 5 November 2009

All 8 members to the legislative assembly
| | Majority party |
|---|---|
| Party | Nonpartisan |
| Seats won | 8 |

The Falkland Islands general election of 2009 was held on Thursday 5 November 2009 to elect members to the Legislative Assembly. It was the first general election in the Falkland Islands since the new constitution came into force on 1 January 2009, which replaced the old Legislative Council with the Legislative Assembly. Chief Executive Tim Thorogood acted as Returning Officer.

Eight MLAs were elected through universal suffrage using block voting, five from the Stanley constituency and three from the Camp constituency. Each elector in Stanley could vote for five candidates, and in Camp each elector could vote for three candidates. In total 4,989 votes were cast in the election, relating to a turnout of 1,232 (77.7% of the electorate). As no political parties are active on the Islands, all the candidates stood as nonpartisans. The election result was said to be an 'upset' as none of the incumbent MLAs kept their seat.

== Results ==
Candidates in bold were elected. Candidates in italic were incumbents.

=== Stanley constituency ===
Stanley result
| List | Candidates | Votes | Of total (%) | ± from prev. |
|---|---|---|---|---|
| Nonpartisan | **Dick Sawle** | **770** | **17.70** | N/A |
| Nonpartisan | **Gavin Short** | **590** | **13.56** | N/A |
| Nonpartisan | **Glenn Ross** | **491** | **11.28** | N/A |
| Nonpartisan | **Emma Edwards** | **474** | **10.89** | N/A |
| Nonpartisan | **Jan Cheek** | **452** | **10.39** | +2.37 |
| Nonpartisan | Mike Summers | 402 | 9.24 | −4.66 |
| Nonpartisan | Eric Goss | 252 | 5.79 | −2.25 |
| Nonpartisan | John Birmingham | 250 | 5.75 | −1.24 |
| Nonpartisan | Norman Clarke | 249 | 5.72 | N/A |
| Nonpartisan | Jackie Cotter | 187 | 4.30 | N/A |
| Nonpartisan | Andrea Clausen | 139 | 3.19 | −10.39 |
| Nonpartisan | Janet Robertson | 95 | 2.18 | −6.53 |
| Turnout | | 4,351 | 75.6 | |

=== Camp constituency ===
Camp result
| List | Candidates | Votes | Of total (%) | ± from prev. |
|---|---|---|---|---|
| Nonpartisan | **Roger Edwards** | **148** | **23.20** | +8.64 |
| Nonpartisan | **Sharon Halford** | **147** | **23.04** | N/A |
| Nonpartisan | **Bill Luxton** | **147** | **23.04** | N/A |
| Nonpartisan | Ian Hansen | 93 | 14.58 | −15.50 |
| Nonpartisan | Richard Stevens | 57 | 8.93 | −10.43 |
| Nonpartisan | Clive Wilkinson | 46 | 7.21 | N/A |
| Turnout | | 638 | 89.3 | |
