= Sharon Halford =

Falkland Islands politician

The Honourable Sharon Halford
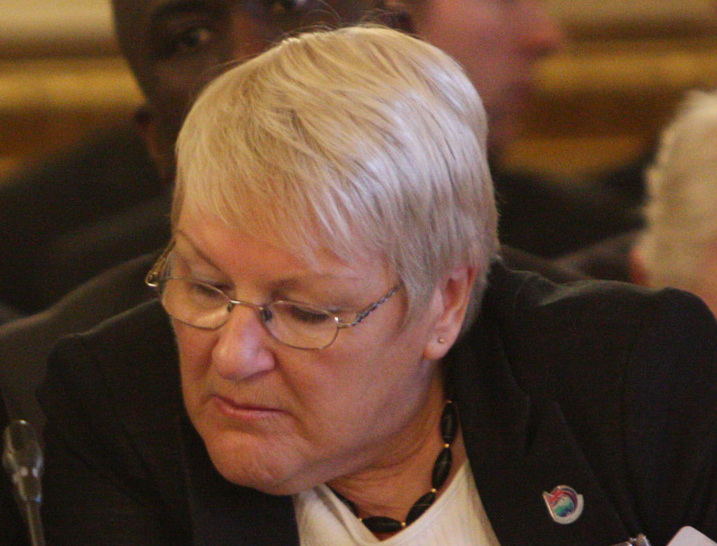

Member of the Falkland Islands Legislative Assembly for the Camp
- In office 5 November 2009 – 7 November 2013
- Preceded by: Mike Rendell
- Succeeded by: Phyl Rendell

Member of the Falkland Islands Legislative Council for Stanley
- In office 14 October 1993 – 22 November 2001
- Preceded by: Fred Robson
- Succeeded by: Richard Cockwell

Personal details
- Born: 27 November 1953 (age 72) Stanley, Falkland Islands
- Party: Nonpartisan
- Spouse: Rodney "John" Halford
- Children: 2 daughters

Sharon Halford (born 27 November 1953) is a Falkland Islands politician who served as a Member of the Legislative Assembly for the Camp constituency from 2009 until 2013. Halford was also a Member of the Legislative Council from 1993–2001 for Stanley.

In 2011 Halford and her husband represented the islands at the wedding of Prince William and Catherine Middleton. She also attended the Overseas Territories Joint Ministerial Council meeting in London in 2012 with Jan Cheek and in 2013 Halford took part in a campaign to promote the interests of the Falkland Islanders following the sovereignty referendum. This included representing the Falklands at the United Nations Special Committee on Decolonization in New York City and at the annual conference of the British Islands and Mediterranean Region of the Commonwealth Parliamentary Association. Halford stood for re-election in November 2013, but lost her seat to Phyl Rendell.
