= Roger Edwards (politician) =

The Honourable Roger Edwards MLA
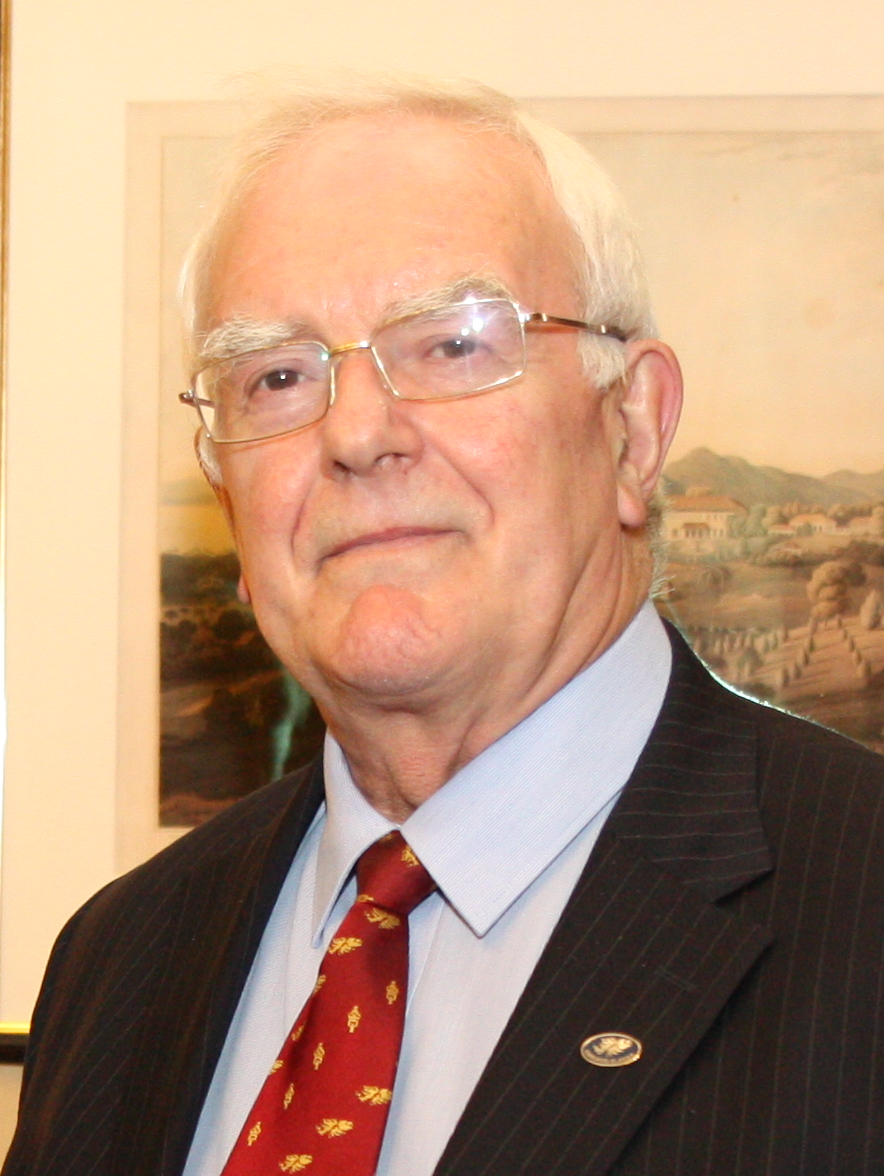

Member of the Falkland Islands Legislative Assembly for Camp
- Incumbent
- Assumed office 5 November 2009
- Preceded by: Ian Hansen

Member of the Falkland Islands Legislative Council for Camp
- In office 22 November 2001 – 17 November 2005
- Preceded by: Richard Cockwell
- Succeeded by: Michael Rendell

Personal details
- Born: 1946 (age 79–80) Brinkworth, Wiltshire
- Party: Nonpartisan
- Spouse: Norma Edwards
- Children: Emma Edwards, Rebecca Edwards
- Education: Britannia Royal Naval College

Military service
- Allegiance: United Kingdom
- Branch/service: Royal Marines; Royal Navy
- Years of service: 1963–1986
- Unit: Fleet Air Arm, D Squadron SAS
- Battles/wars: Falklands War

Roger Edwards (born 1946) is a former Royal Marine who has served as a Member of the Legislative Assembly for the Camp constituency since the 2009 general election, winning re-election in 2013 and 2017. He was previously a Member of the Legislative Council from 2001–2005 and is the father of former MLA Emma Edwards.

Edwards joined the Royal Marines in 1963, but transferred to the Royal Navy's Fleet Air Arm in September 1965, before going on to the Britannia Royal Naval College during which time he trained to be a pilot at RAF Linton-on-Ouse. From 1973 to 1975, Edwards served on HMS Endurance while it patrolled Falklands territorial waters. He was attached to the Special Air Service in 1982 during the Falklands War.

In 1982 Edwards retired from the armed forces and bought a farm on West Falkland with his wife, Norma (a Falkland Islander and former member of the Legislative Council). His current portfolios as an MLA are Treasury & Taxation and Europe.
