= Jack Ford (Falkland Islands politician) =

Falkland Islander politician

The Honourable Jack Ford MLA

Member of the Falkland Islands Legislative Assembly for Camp
- Incumbent
- Assumed office 22 September 2023
- Preceded by: Ian Hansen

Personal details
- Born: Jack Christopher Ford

Jack Christopher Ford is a Falkland Islander politician. He has served as a member of the Falkland Islands Legislative Assembly for Camp since 2023.

== Life and career ==
Jack Christopher Ford received a degree in international relations from the University of Buckingham. In September 2023, he was the youngest employee for the auditing department of the Falkland Islands.

On 19 July 2023, longtime MLA Ian Hansen resigned from the assembly, citing "continuing serious health issues". Ford stood as a candidate in the 2023 Camp by-election, held from 21 September. He ran on a platform of encouraging industry diversification and investment in key infrastructure. Ford raised concerns about climate change and the wool industry's future. Ford ended up defeating his opponent, Gary Webb, 122–63.

Ford was re-elected as an MLA for Camp during the 2025 Falkland Islands General Election alongside Michael Goss and Dot Gould.
