= Camp (constituency) =

Constituency of the Legislative Assembly of the Falkland Islands

- Legislative Assembly of the Falkland Islands constituency
- Location of Camp within the Falkland Islands
- Population: 381 (2016)
- Major settlements: Fox Bay, Goose Green, Darwin, Port Howard, Port Louis

Current constituency
- Created: 1977
- Number of members: 1 (1977–1985); 4 (1985–1997); 3 (1997–present)
- Party: Nonpartisans
- Members: Jack Ford; Michael Goss; Dot Gould

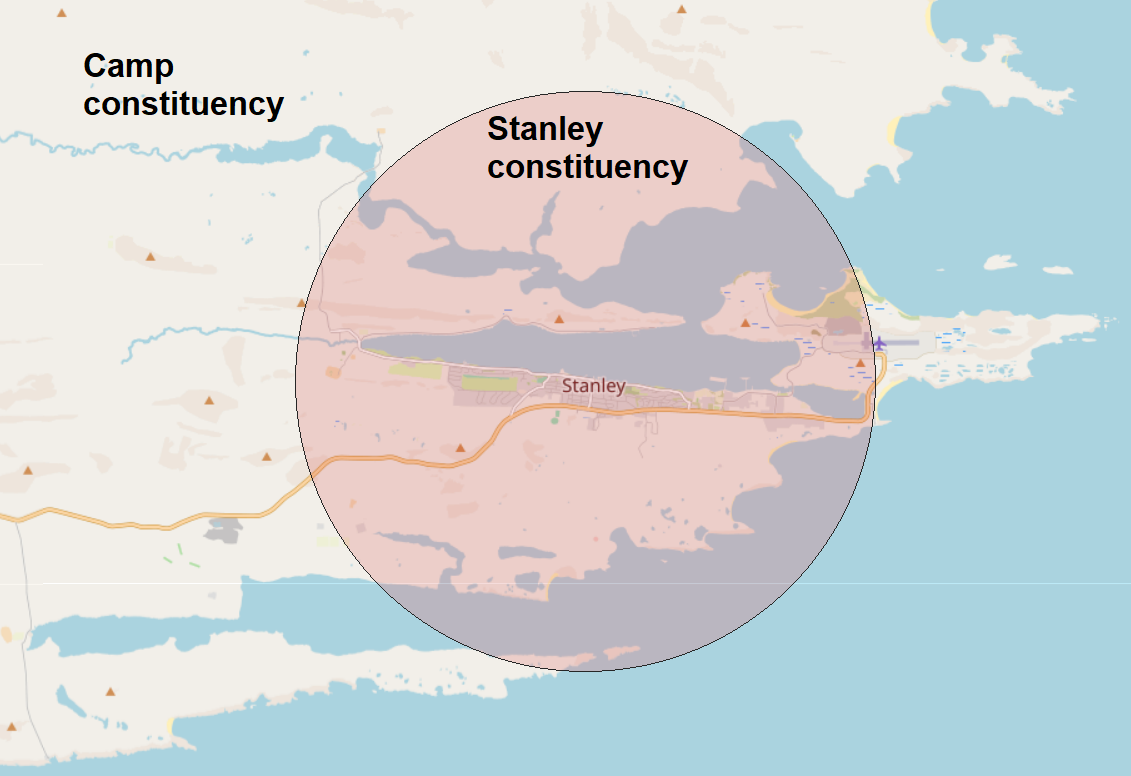
Constituencies of the Falkland Islands

Camp is a constituency of the Legislative Assembly of the Falkland Islands which has been in existence since 1977. The constituency of Camp consists of all parts of the territory which lie more than 3.5 miles from the spire of Christ Church Cathedral, Stanley. It takes its name from the term "Camp", which refers to the territory outside the city of Stanley and RAF Mount Pleasant. Camp is one of two constituencies in the Falklands, the other being Stanley.

The Camp constituency was created at the 1977 election with the implementation of the Falkland Islands (Legislative Council) (Amendment) Order 1977, initially electing one member to the Legislative Council (the predecessor of the Legislative Assembly). In 1985 the Falkland Islands Constitution came into force which increased the number of members from Camp to four, elected through block voting. This was reduced to three in 1997 following a constitutional amendment. In 2009 a new constitution came into force which replaced the Legislative Council with the Legislative Assembly, with all members of the Legislative Council becoming members of the new Legislative Assembly.

In referendums in 2001, 2011 and 2020, a proposal was put to the people of the Falklands for the Stanley and Camp constituencies to be abolished and replaced with a single constituency for the entire territory. The proposal was rejected on all three occasions.

== Members ==
Election	1st Member	2nd Member	3rd Member	4th Member
1977	Timothy John Durose Miller			
1981	Anthony Thomas Blake			
1985	Anthony Thomas Blake	Robin Myles Lee	Lionel Geoffrey Blake	Timothy John Durose Miller
1986 (by-election)	Anthony Thomas Blake	Robin Myles Lee	Lionel Geoffrey Blake	Eric Miller Goss
1989	Ron Binnie	Norma Edwards	Bill Luxton	Kevin Kilmartin
1993	Eric Goss	Norma Edwards	Bill Luxton	Richard Stevens
1997	Richard Cockwell	Norma Edwards	Bill Luxton	
2001	Roger Edwards	Norma Edwards	Philip Miller	
2003 (by-election)	Roger Edwards	Norma Edwards	Ian Hansen	
2005	Mike Rendell	Richard Stevens	Ian Hansen	
2009	Roger Edwards	Bill Luxton	Sharon Halford	
2011 (by-election)	Roger Edwards	Ian Hansen	Sharon Halford	
2013	Roger Edwards	Ian Hansen	Phyl Rendell	
2017	Roger Edwards	Ian Hansen	Teslyn Barkman	
2021	John Birmingham	Ian Hansen	Teslyn Barkman	
2023 (by-election)	John Birmingham	Jack Ford	Teslyn Barkman	
2025	Michael Goss	Jack Ford	Dot Gould	
