= Cheryl Roberts =

Falkland Islander politician

Cheryl Roberts MLA

Member of the Falkland Islands Legislative Assembly for Stanley
- Incumbent
- Assumed office 12 December 2025

Personal details
- Born: Cheryl Ann Spencer Roberts; 1959 or 1960 (age 65–66)

Cheryl Ann Spencer Roberts (born 1959 or 1960) is a Falkland Islander politician. She has served as a member of the Falkland Islands Legislative Assembly for Stanley since 2025. Prior to her election, she was involved in the fishing industry of the Falklands.

== Biography ==
Cheryl Ann Spencer Roberts was born in born 1959 or 1960.

In 2003, her and Peter Roberts purchased the Beauchene Fishing Company, based in Stanley. By December 2011, Roberts had recently been made the chair of the Falkland Islands Fishing Company Association (FIFCA). Following an announcement that Mercosur states would close their ports to Falkland Islander ships, Roberts stated that the Falklands should consider building their own port facilities.

Roberts was one of fifteen candidates to contest the 2025 Falkland Islands general election in the Stanley constituency. In a summary provided to Falkland Islands Television, Roberts identified including greater cooperation between the government and private sector, appropriate investment in infrastructure, and addressing immigration urgently as priorities were she to be elected to the Legislative Assembly. In an election marked by upheaval, Roberts was one of five successful candidates in Stanley, and one of four to be newly elected, receiving 694 votes. Following the election, Roberts was appointed to the Executive Council. She was also made the lead MLA for the Trade, Industry, and Mineral Resources portfolio, and deputy for the Public Infrastructure portfolio.

In February 2026, Roberts was removed from the board of Consolidated Fisheries Ltd, due to a perceived conflict of interest between her role on the board and position as a member of the Legislative Assembly.
