= Ian Hansen =

Falkland Islands politician (1958–2025)

The Honourable Ian Hansen MLA
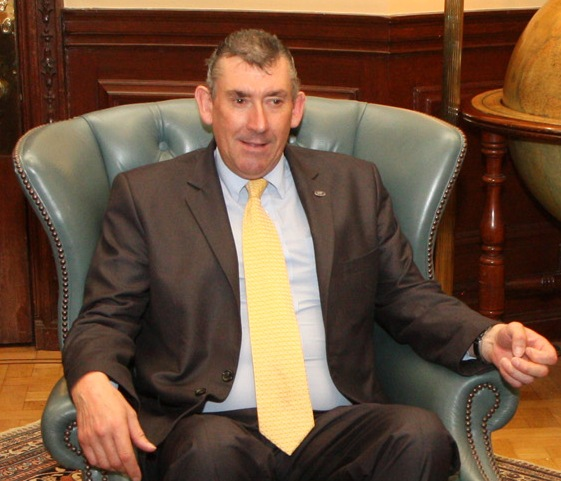

Member of the Falkland Islands Legislative Assembly for Camp
- In office 15 December 2011 – 19 July 2023
- Preceded by: Bill Luxton
- Succeeded by: Jack Ford
- In office 6 November 2003 – 5 November 2009
- Preceded by: Philip Harper
- Succeeded by: Roger Edwards

Personal details
- Born: 29 December 1958 Hill Cove, Falkland Islands
- Died: 17 February 2025 (aged 66) Hill Cove, Falkland Islands
- Party: Nonpartisan
- Spouse: Susan Betts

Ian Hansen (29 December 1958 – 17 February 2025) was a Falkland Islander farmer and politician who served as a Member of the Legislative Assembly for the Camp constituency after winning an uncontested by-election in 2011 which filled the seat vacated by Bill Luxton. Hansen had already served on the Legislative Assembly from 2003 until 2009. He was initially elected as a member of the Legislative Council, which was reconstituted into the Legislative Assembly with the implementation of the 2009 Constitution.

== Background ==
From 1974 to 1980, Hansen worked as a shepherd at Hill Cove before moving to work on Pebble Island as a stockman. He was a founding member of the Falkland Islands Farmers Association and was chairman of the Rural Business Association from 2000 until 2003.

Hansen died on 17 February 2025, at the age of 66. The flag at Gilbert House was flown at half-mast on the day of his funeral.

== Political career ==
In 2003, Hansen joined the Legislative Council as a member for Camp after winning a by-election to fill the seat left vacant by Philip Miller. He lost his seat in the 2009 general election. Hansen returned to the Legislative Assembly in 2011 after being the only candidate in a by-election to fill the seat vacated by Bill Luxton. He won re-election in 2013 and 2017. Hansen resigned from the Legislative Assembly on 19 July 2023 due to health issues. His seat was filled by Jack Ford in a by-election on 21 September 2023.
