= John Birmingham (politician) =

British-born Falkland Islands politician

The Honourable John Birmingham

Member of the Falkland Islands Legislative Assembly for Camp
- In office 4 November 2021 – 31 October 2025

Member of the Falkland Islands Legislative Assembly for Stanley
- In office 3 January 2008 – 5 November 2009
- Preceded by: Richard Davies
- Succeeded by: Dick Sawle

Member of the Falkland Islands Legislative Council for Stanley
- In office 15 December 1994 – 17 November 2005
- Preceded by: Charles Kennleyside
- Succeeded by: Andrea Clausen

Personal details
- Born: 1953 (age 72–73) Salford, Lancashire
- Party: Nonpartisan
- Spouse: Louise
- Education: Chichester College

John Birmingham (born 1953) is a British-born Falkland Islands politician who served as a Member of the Legislative Assembly for the Camp constituency from 2021 to 2025. He previously represented Stanley constituency from a by-election in 2008 until the 2009 general election. Birmingham was elected as a Member of the Legislative Council, which was reconstituted into the Legislative Assembly with the implementation of the 2009 Constitution. He was previously a Member of the Legislative Council from 1994–2005.

Birmingham was born in England and educated at Chichester College. At the age of seventeen, he joined the British Merchant Navy. Four years later he left the Navy and travelled to the Falklands to work on a Camp sheep farm.

Birmingham was first elected to the Legislative Council in a 1994 by-election and was re-elected in 1997 and 2001, but lost his seat in 2005. He returned to the Legislative Council at a by-election in 2008 to fill the seat left vacant by Richard Davies, but he lost his seat again in the 2009 general election.
