= Dean Dent =

Falkland Islander politician

Dean Dent MLA

Member of the Falkland Islands Legislative Assembly for Stanley
- Incumbent
- Assumed office 12 December 2025

Personal details
- Born: 1996 or 1997 (age 28–29)

Dean Angus Dent is a Falkland Islander politician. He has served as a member of the Falkland Islands Legislative Assembly for Stanley since 2025.
