= Michael Goss =

Falkland Islander politician

Michael Goss MLA

Member of the Falkland Islands Legislative Assembly for Camp
- Incumbent
- Assumed office 12 December 2025

Michael Peter Goss is a Falkland Islander politician. He has served as a member of the Falkland Islands Legislative Assembly for Camp since 2025.
