= Dot Gould =

Falkland Islander politician

Dot Gould MLA

Member of the Falkland Islands Legislative Assembly for Camp
- Incumbent
- Assumed office 12 December 2025

Dorothy Ruth Gould is a Falkland Islander politician. She has served as a member of the Falkland Islands Legislative Assembly for Camp since 2025.

Dot is the owner of Pebble Island, one of the outer islands which comprise the Falkland Islands, with her husband Alex.
