= Stanley (constituency) =

Falkland Islands constituency

- Legislative Assembly of the Falkland Islands constituency
- Location of Stanley within the Falkland Islands
- Population: 2,460 (2016)
- Major settlements: Stanley

Current constituency
- Created: 1949
- Number of members: 2 (1949–1977); 1 (1977–1985); 4 (1985–1997); 5 (1997–present)
- Party: Nonpartisans
- Members: Stacy Bragger; Lewis Clifton; Dean Dent; Cheryl Roberts; Roger Spink

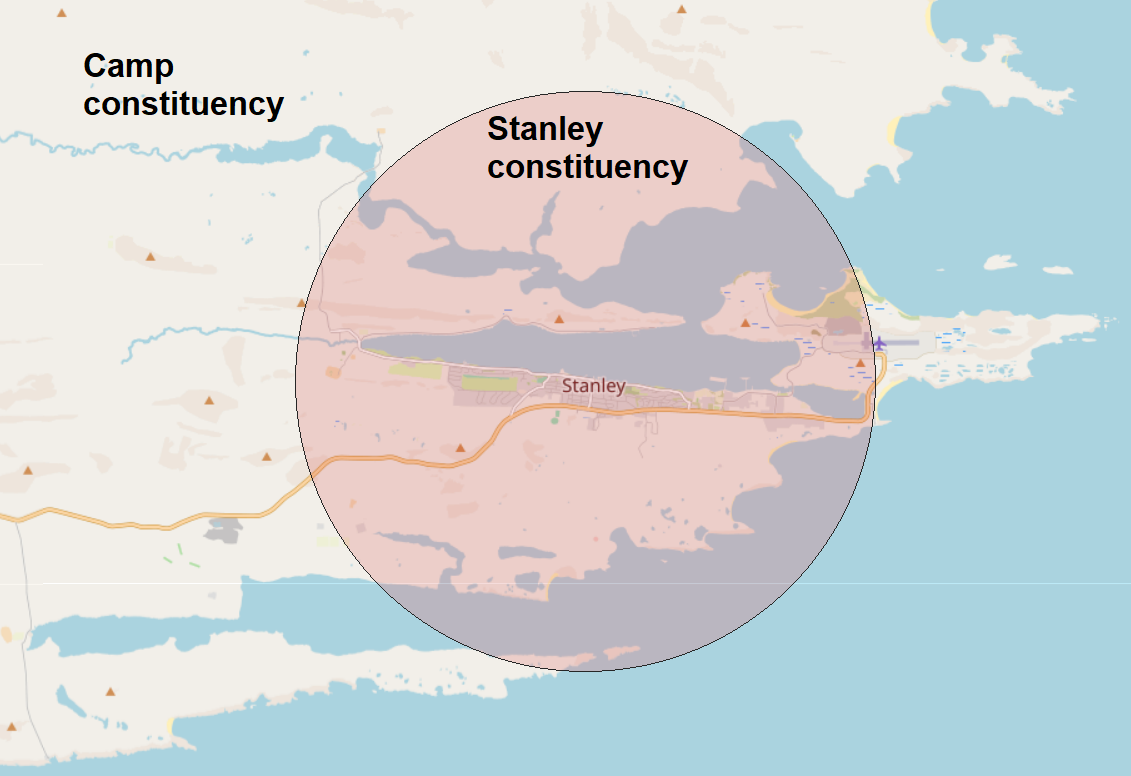
Constituencies of the Falkland Islands

Stanley is a constituency of the Legislative Assembly of the Falkland Islands which has been in existence since the first elections in the Falklands in 1949. The constituency of Stanley consists of the area that lies within 5.6 kilometres (3.5 mi) of the spire of Christ Church Cathedral. This covers the city of Stanley, which is the largest settlement in the Falklands representing almost 75% of the total population of the islands (excluding military personnel). Stanley is one of two constituencies in the Falklands, the other being Camp.

The first elections to the Legislative Council (the predecessor of the Legislative Assembly) took place in 1949 and elected two members from Stanley. The number of members was reduced to one at the 1977 election with the implementation of the Falkland Islands (Legislative Council) (Amendment) Order 1977. In 1985 the Falkland Islands Constitution came into force which increased the number of members from Stanley to four, elected through block voting. This was increased to five in 1997 following a constitutional amendment, giving the members from Stanley a majority of the elected seats. In 2009 a new constitution came into force which replaced the Legislative Council with the Legislative Assembly, with all members of the Legislative Council becoming members of the new Legislative Assembly.

In referendums in 2001, 2011 and 2020, a proposal was put to the people of the Falklands for the Stanley and Camp constituencies to be abolished and replaced with a single constituency for the entire territory. The proposal was rejected on all three occasions, but in the 2011 and 2020 referendums a majority of voters in Stanley supported the proposal.

== Members ==
Election	First member	Second member	Third member	Fourth member	Fifth member
1949	Stanley Charles Luxton	Arthur Leslie Hardy			
1952	Stanley Charles Luxton	Arthur Leslie Hardy			
1956	Martin George Creece	Arthur Leslie Hardy			
1960	Richard Victor Goss	Arthur Leslie Hardy			
1962 (by-election)	Richard Victor Goss	John Richard Rowlands			
1964	Richard Victor Goss	Frederick John Cheek			
1968	Richard Victor Goss	Nanette King			
1971	William Edward Bowles	Sydney Miller			
1976	William Edward Bowles	John Smith			
1977	William Edward Bowles				
1981	Terence John Peck				
1984 (by-election)	Harold Bennett				
1985	John Edward Cheek	Lewis Clifton	Norma Edwards	Charles Desmond Keenleyside Jnr.	
1987 (by-election)	John Edward Cheek	Lewis Clifton	Terry Betts	Charles Desmond Keenleyside Jnr.	
1989	Gerrard "Fred" Robson	Harold Rowlands	Gavin Short	Terry Peck	
1993	John Cheek	Charles Keenleyside	Sharon Halford	Wendy Teggart	
1994 (by-election)	John Cheek	John Birmingham	Sharon Halford	Wendy Teggart	
1996 (by-election)	Mike Summers	John Birmingham	Sharon Halford	Wendy Teggart	
1997	Mike Summers	John Birmingham	Sharon Halford	Jan Cheek	Lewis Clifton
2001	Mike Summers	John Birmingham	Richard Cockwell	Jan Cheek	Stephen Luxton
2005	Mike Summers	Andrea Clausen	Richard Cockwell	Richard Andrew Davies	Janet Robertson
2008 (by-election)	Mike Summers	Andrea Clausen	Richard Cockwell	John Birmingham	Janet Robertson
2009	Jan Cheek	Emma Edwards	Glenn Ross	Gavin Short	Richard Sawle
June 2011 (by-election)	Jan Cheek	Emma Edwards	Mike Summers	Gavin Short	Richard Sawle
December 2011 (by-election)	Jan Cheek	Barry Elsby	Mike Summers	Gavin Short	Richard Sawle
2013	Jan Cheek	Barry Elsby	Mike Summers	Gavin Short	Michael Poole
2017	Stacy Bragger	Barry Elsby	Mark Pollard	Roger Spink	Leona Vidal Roberts
2021	Pete Biggs	Gavin Short	Mark Pollard	Roger Spink	Leona Vidal Roberts
2025	Stacy Bragger	Dean Dent	Cheryl Roberts	Roger Spink	Lewis Clifton
