= Roger Spink =

Falkland Islands politician (born 1959)

The Honourable Roger Spink MLA

Member of the Falkland Islands Legislative Assembly for Stanley
- Incumbent
- Assumed office 9 November 2017
- Preceded by: Michael Poole

Personal details
- Born: December 1959 (age 66)
- Party: Nonpartisan

Roger Kenneth Spink (born December 1959) is a Falkland Islands politician who has served as a Member of the Legislative Assembly for the Stanley constituency since the 2017 general election.

Before his election, Spink served as Director and General Manager of the Falkland Islands Company from 2001 and then in 2006 he was appointed President of the Falkland Islands Chamber of Commerce, retiring from both positions in 2016.
