= Falkland Islands Development Corporation =

Falkland Islands quasi-autonomous government agency

The Falkland Islands Development Corporation (FIDC) is a now defunct quasi-autonomous, government-established, largely self-funding body that was responsible for encouraging the economic development of the Falkland Islands. It was set up in 1984 and was mainly funded from its own reserves and income streams. Initiatives it had fostered include air transport, connection to the global containerised shipping network, supporting agricultural diversification, establishing a meat export industry and promoting tourism. It also provided advice, loans and grants to further local business development.
