= Norma Edwards =

Falkland Islands politician

The Honourable Norma Edwards OBE

Member of the Falkland Islands Legislative Council for Camp
- In office 12 October 1989 – 17 November 2005
- Succeeded by: Richard Stevens

Member of the Falkland Islands Legislative Council for Stanley
- In office 3 October 1985 – 1987
- Succeeded by: Terry Betts

Personal details
- Party: Nonpartisan
- Spouse: Roger Edwards
- Children: Emma, Rebecca

Norma Edwards OBE is a Falkland Islands politician. She served for two decades on the Falkland Islands Legislative Council and has been described as a "noted hard-liner" in opposition to Argentine control of the islands.

Edwards is a native Falkland Islander, the fourth generation born on the islands. She pursued her early schooling there before leaving for the United Kingdom, where she trained as a nurse. She lived for a time in Portsmouth, England, where her daughters Emma and Rebecca were born, before returning to the Falklands with her family after the 1982 war.

She was first elected to the Falkland Islands Legislative Council to represent Stanley in 1985, the first election after the islands' 1985 constitution came into force. She resigned from that post in 1987, and in 1989 she returned to the council as a representative of the Camp constituency, a position she held until her retirement in 2005.

Edwards has advocated in favor of the Falkland Islands' right to self-determination, in opposition to Argentina's claim to the islands. She was a fierce opponent of the 1999 Anglo-Argentine joint agreement and offered testimony to the United Nations in favor of the British side of the dispute.

Her husband, Roger Edwards, whom she married in 1970, is a current member of the Falkland Islands Legislative Assembly. The couple has lived on and run a farm on West Falkland since 1986. Her daughter Emma Edwards also served on the Legislative Assembly from 2009 until 2011. Her younger daughter, Rebecca, is the first-ever female physician from the Falklands.

Edwards was appointed an Officer of the British Empire in the 2006 Birthday Honours for "services to the community."
