= Camp (Falkland Islands) =

Areas outside the largest town of Stanley

Coordinates: 51°41′S 59°10′W

Map of constituencies of the Falkland Islands

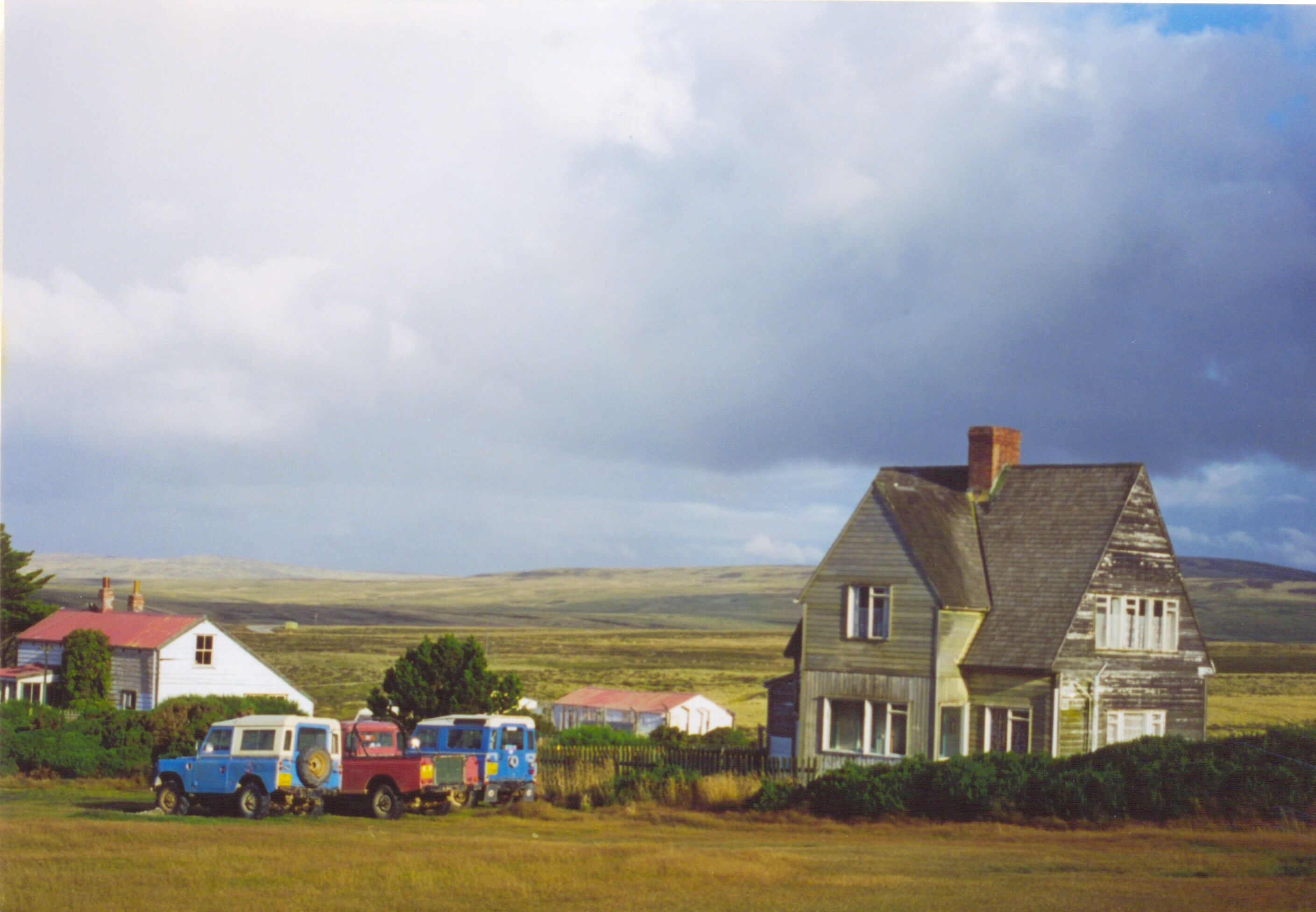
A Camp settlement

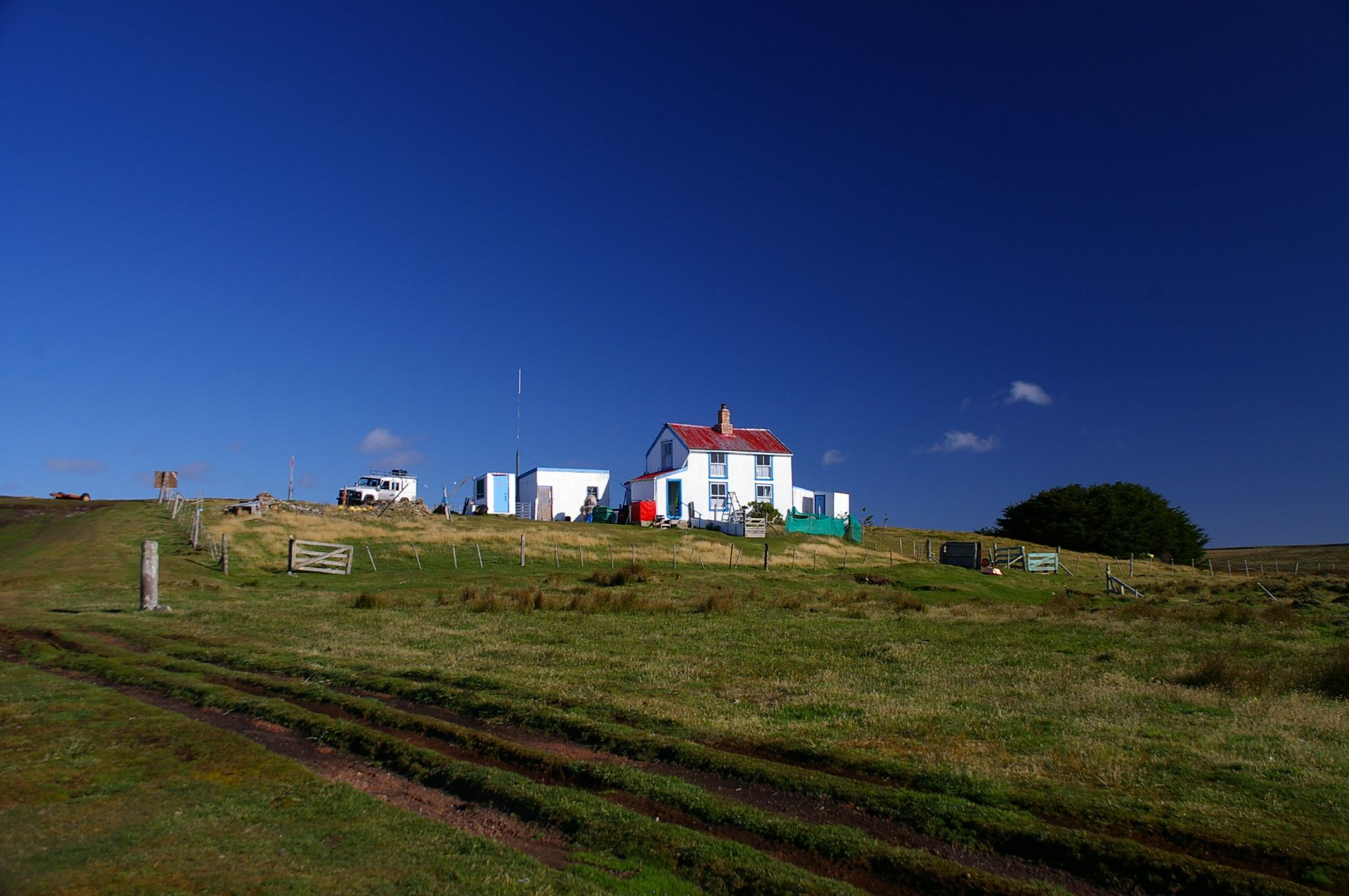
Volunteer Point

Camp is the term used in the Falkland Islands to refer to any part of the islands outside the islands' only significant town, Stanley, and often the large RAF base at Mount Pleasant. It is derived from the Spanish word campo, for "countryside", and is used without a definite article, hence "in Camp", not "in the Camp".

The area contains various small settlements, such as Fox Bay, Goose Green, Darwin, and Port Howard, which are usually little more than several houses. Port Louis in the north of East Falkland is the oldest permanent settlement in the islands, established by the French in 1764. Port Egmont on Saunders Island, now abandoned, is the oldest British settlement. The majority of the Camp population lives on East Falkland, followed by West Falkland. Outlying islands such as Pebble, Sea Lion, West Point, Weddell and Carcass Island are inhabited as well. "Camp" is used in formal contexts: e.g. the Falkland Islands Legislative Assembly has Stanley and Camp constituencies.

Falkland Islanders living in the Camp districts were historically isolated from those in Stanley. In 1933, during the celebrations for the centenary of British settlement in the Falklands, Governor James O'Grady observed that many Camp residents were visiting Stanley for the first time and that "they and the town people are complete strangers".

There are also some British military installations such as RAF Mount Pleasant, Mare Harbour, and Mount Alice, and there is also the Bodie Suspension Bridge, the southernmost of its kind in the world. Many parts were landmined from the time of the Falklands War, particularly just outside Stanley. As of November 2020, the Falklands were declared clear of all landmines.

The official time zone of the Falklands is UTC-3 year-round (before September 2010, only in the summer months), but many residents of Camp use UTC-4 all year, known on the Falklands as "Camp Time". This caused confusion in 2009 when a team of Royal Engineers working in Hill Cove did not realise West Falkland was on a different time zone from Stanley.

Sheep farming is the main industry in Camp, with others including fishing, and tourism, particularly wildlife or war-related tours. It is represented by three members of the Legislative Assembly, currently Teslyn Barkman, John Birmingham and Jack Ford.

== See also ==
- Falkland Islands
- West Falkland
- Lafonia
- Geography of the Falkland Islands
- Falklands War
- Country (identity)
