= Richard Cockwell =

British-born Falkland Islands politician (born 1939)

The Honourable Richard Cockwell OBE

Member of the Falkland Islands Legislative Assembly for Stanley Camp (1997–2001)
- In office 9 October 1997 – 5 November 2009
- Preceded by: John Cheek
- Succeeded by: Emma Edwards

Personal details
- Born: John Richard Cockwell; 1939 (age 86–87) England
- Party: Nonpartisan
- Domestic partner: Grizelda Cockwell
- Children: Adam Cockwell Ben Cockwell Sam Cockwell

John Richard Cockwell OBE (born 1939) is a British-born Falkland Islands politician who served as a Member of the Legislative Council for the Camp constituency from 1997 until 2001, and then as a member for the Stanley constituency from 2001 until 2009.

Cockwell grew up in Hampshire and attended Stanbridge Earls. He briefly worked as a shepherd on Salisbury Plain before moving to Australia. He moved to the Falkland Islands in 1964 to work at Packe Brothers and Co limited in Fox Bay, becoming the company's Manager in 1967.

He was elected to the Legislative Council at the 1997 general election for the Camp constituency and re-elected four years later as a member for Stanley. He didn't seek re-election in 2009.
