= Governor of the Falkland Islands =

- Coat of Arms of the Falkland Islands

- Standard of the Governor of the Falkland Islands

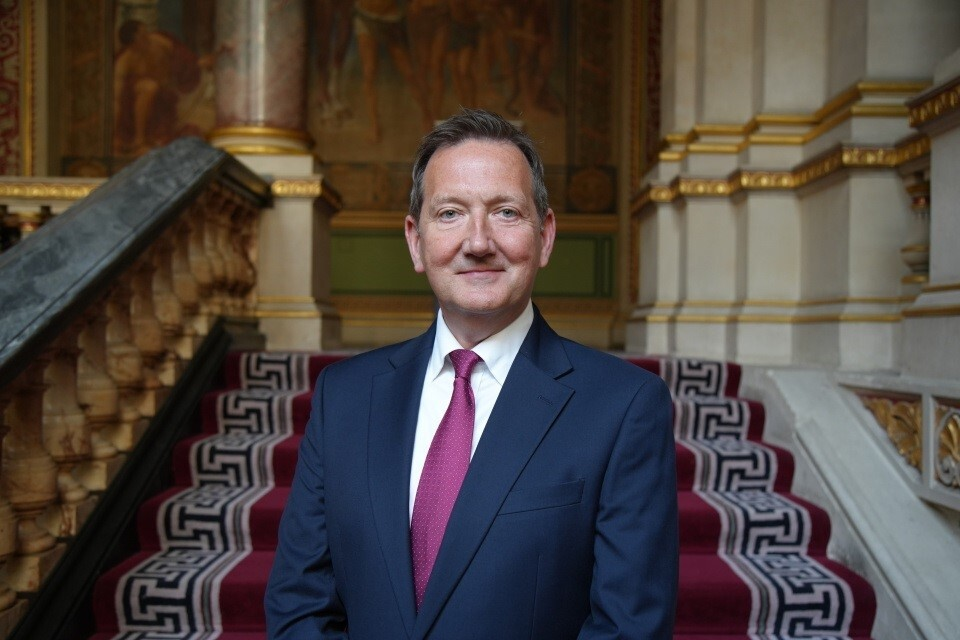
- Incumbent; Colin Martin-Reynolds since 29 July 2025
- Viceroy
- Style: His Excellency
- Residence: Government House, Stanley
- Appointer: Monarch of the United Kingdom
- Term length: At His Majesty's pleasure
- Formation: 1764
- First holder: Louis Antoine de Bougainville as Administrator of the French Settlement
- Website: Office of the Governor

The governor of the Falkland Islands is the representative of the British Crown in the Falkland Islands, acting "in His Majesty's name and on His Majesty's behalf" as the islands' Viceroy in the absence of the British monarch. The role and powers of the governor are set out in Chapter II of the Falkland Islands Constitution. The governor in office resides at Government House in Stanley, which serves as the official residence.

== History ==
The history of the leadership on the islands is closely related to the history of the Falkland Islands themselves. The first settlement on the islands was at Port St. Louis and was led by Louis Antoine de Bougainville, the administrator of the French settlement which started in 1764 and ended three years later. The first leader of a British settlement was John McBride, captain of HMS Jason, in 1766 at Port Egmont (the settlement being established a year earlier). The French settlement of Port St. Louis was transferred to the Spanish in 1767 and renamed Puerto Soledad, the first Spanish military administrator being Felipe Ruíz Puente. The British chose to withdraw from many overseas settlements in 1776 owing to the pressure of the American War of Independence. The Spanish settlement ended in 1811 as a result of the Peninsular War.

In 1829 Luis Vernet was proclaimed Military and Civil Commander of Puerto Luis (the Falklands) by the United Provinces of South America, which elicited a protest from the British government. In 1831, Vernet seized three US vessels and imprisoned their crews for contravening his regulations on sealing, prompting a raid by the USS Lexington. In response, the United Kingdom sent a task force to reassert British sovereignty over the Falkland Islands in 1833. The Falklands were then settled, mainly by people from Wales and Scotland.

The first governor of the Falklands was Richard Clement Moody, who was governor from 1841 to 1848: his office was renamed 'governor' from 'lieutenant-governor' in 1843. Moody selected the site for and founded Stanley and Moody Brook is named after him. There was then a British government on the islands until 1982 when the Falklands were invaded and occupied by Argentina for 74 days. During this time, the British governor (Sir Rex Hunt) was expelled and General of Brigade Mario Menéndez was appointed 'Military Governor of the Malvinas, South Georgia and the South Sandwich Islands' (Spanish: Gobernador Militar de las Islas Malvinas, Georgias del Sur y Sandwich del Sur) by the Argentine military junta.

Following the Argentine surrender at the end of the Falklands War, the British governor returned and it was decided that the government of the Falkland Islands should be modernised. In 1985 the Constitution of the Falklands came into force which greatly reduced the power of the governor, making the office more accountable to the Executive Council of the Falkland Islands and creating in law a new post of Chief Executive, to which many powers of the governor were delegated. In 2009 a new constitution was established which further defined the role and powers of the governor.

== Appointment and powers ==
The governor is appointed by the King on the advice of his secretary of state for foreign and Commonwealth affairs in the United Kingdom. The appointment is actually made by a royal commission under the royal sign-manual.

Under the Constitution, executive authority of the Falkland Islands is vested in the King, and his authority is exercised on his behalf by the governor. The governor normally only executes executive power on the advice of the Executive Council of the Falkland Islands, which consists of three elected members of the Legislative Assembly, the chief executive and the director of finance. In addition, the attorney general and the commander of the British Forces in the South Atlantic attend council meetings by invitation, although they cannot vote in the council meetings. The governor also acts as the presiding officer of the Executive Council.

Acting on the advice of the Executive Council, the governor has the power to call a meeting of the Executive Council, dissolve the Legislative Assembly and call a general election by proclamation, recall a dissolved Assembly, give royal assent to laws passed by the Legislative Assembly, and disallow or reintroduce a law passed by the Legislative Assembly. The governor also appoints the members and can remove members of the Advisory Committee on the Prerogative of Mercy after consulting the Legislative Assembly. On the advice of the advisory committee, the governor may grant pardons to anyone convicted of any offence, as well as commute or remit any sentence of any person convicted on the islands.

In most cases, the governor must consult with the Executive Council and accept its advice. There are exceptions, however, set out in the constitution, when the governor is permitted to not consult the council and even go against its advice, but in this eventuality, the governor is required to inform the secretary of state in the United Kingdom of the reasons for this action, and in the case of blocking laws passed by the Legislative Assembly, the secretary of state must give prior authorisation. Under section 67 of the constitution, the governor may go against the advice of the council if in his or her judgement, it would be right to do so in the interests of good governance or if such advice would affect external affairs, defence, internal security (including the police), administration of justice, audit, appointments to the public service, the discipline and removal from office of public officers, and the management of the public service. In all these instances the members of the Executive Council can appeal to the secretary of state.

The governor is also responsible for the defence and internal security of the Falklands (with the exception of police matters), although the governor is constitutionally obliged to consult with the commander of the British Forces on such matters.

== Acting governor ==
If the office of governor ever becomes vacant or if the incumbent governor is absent from the Falklands or unable to perform his or her duties, the King, on the advice of his secretary of state, can appoint an acting governor under section 24 of the constitution. The acting governor must take the oath before assuming office and has all the powers and duties of the governor until a new governor is appointed or the incumbent governor is able to carry on with his or her duties.

== Oath or affirmation ==
Under section 23(3) of the constitution, before entering upon the functions of his or her office, the governor must take the oath of allegiance and the oath of office. The wording for the oath of office is specified in Annex B to the Constitution:

"I, name, do swear (or solemnly affirm) that I will well and truly serve His Majesty King Charles the Third, His Heirs and Successors, and the people of the Falkland Islands, and will uphold the Constitution and other laws in force in the Falkland Islands, in the office of Governor. (So help me God.)"

== Power and responsibilities ==
The Governor of the Falkland Islands is the representative of the British monarch and serves as the territory's head of state. The Governor's roles and responsibilities include:

- Exercising executive authority on behalf of the Monarch
- Chairing and presiding over meetings of the Executive Council
- Acting on the advice of the Executive Council in the administration of government
- Calling meetings of the Executive Council
- Dissolving the Legislative Assembly and calling general elections
- Recalling a dissolved Legislative Assembly
- Granting Royal Assent to laws passed by the Legislative Assembly
- Disallowing, reserving, or reintroducing legislation in accordance with constitutional procedures
- Appointing and removing members of the Advisory Committee on the Prerogative of Mercy after consultation with the Legislative Assembly
- Granting pardons, reducing sentences, or remitting penalties on the advice of the Advisory Committee on the Prerogative of Mercy
- Overseeing defence and internal security matters, in consultation with the Commander of British Forces South Atlantic Islands
- Appointing the Chief Executive and certain public officials as provided by the Constitution
- Delegating some functions to the Chief Executive
- Ensuring good governance and proper administration of the territory
- Acting independently of the Executive Council in specific constitutional circumstances involving external affairs, defence, internal security, administration of justice, audit matters, public service appointments, discipline of public officers, and management of the public service
- Reporting to the United Kingdom Government when acting contrary to the advice of the Executive Council

== Sources ==
- "Falkland Islands Government Website". falklands.gov.fk. Archived from the original on 27 January 2012.
- "Falkland Islands (British Overseas Territory)". Foreign and Commonwealth Office. Archived from the original on 25 September 2012.
- "The Falkland Islands Constitution Order 2008" (PDF). falklands.gov.fk. 1 January 2009. Archived from the original (PDF) on 23 November 2009.
- "Falkland Islands info". falklands.info. Archived from the original on 2 May 2010.
