= Constitution of the Falkland Islands =

The Falkland Islands Constitution is a predominantly codified constitution documented primarily within the Falkland Islands Constitution Order 2008, a statutory instrument of the United Kingdom. The constitution, in its present form, was made on 5 November 2008 by Queen Elizabeth II in a meeting of the Privy Council at Buckingham Palace. It was laid before Parliament on 12 November 2008 and came into force on 1 January 2009, replacing the 1985 constitution.

== History ==
After the reassertion of British sovereignty over the Falklands in 1833, the islands were administered under military law by the British Admiralty. At the start of the 1840s colonists began to settle in the islands. As a result, in 1842 the Falklands were put under the control of a Civil Administrator (later becoming the office of Governor) under the Colonial Office and in 1843 the islands officially became a Crown Colony. In 1845 the first Governor of the Falkland Islands, Richard Moody, formally inaugurated the Executive Council and Legislative Council in the newly founded town of Stanley.

The members of both councils were appointed by the Governor until 1949 when the first elections took place for four of the twelve members of the Legislative Council. In 1964 the membership of the Legislative Council was reduced to eight and in 1977 the number of elected members was increased to six, eliminating all remaining appointed members of the council and giving the elected members a majority of the seats. The membership of the Executive Council was also updated, with two seats reserved for elected members of the Legislative Council.

The Falklands became a British Dependent Territory in 1981 with the British Nationality Act 1981 and in 1983 the Falkland Islanders were granted British citizenship under the British Nationality (Falkland Islands) Act 1983. On 18 April 1985 the Falkland Islands Constitution Order 1985 came into force which increased the number of elected members of the Legislative Council to eight and guaranteed the Falkland Islanders' rights and constitutional arrangements. In 1997 the constitution was amended with regard to voters rights and in 2002 the Falklands became a British Overseas Territory with the implantation of the British Overseas Territories Act 2002.

On 1 January 2009 the current constitution came into force with the Falkland Islands Constitution Order 2008, replacing the 1985 version. The new constitution modernised the Chapter on fundamental rights and freedoms of the individual and embedded self-determination in the main body of the Constitution. It also created an elected Legislative Assembly, which replaced the Legislative Council, better defined the role of the Executive Council and reduced the powers of the Governor. The new constitution also provided for finance, the public service, the administration of justice, and a Complaints Commissioner.

== Structure ==
=== Chapter I: Protection of Fundamental Rights and Freedoms of the Individual ===
The first chapter of the Constitution, which is made up of sections 1-22, lays out the fundamental rights and freedoms of those in the Falkland Islands. The wording is broadly taken from documents such as the Universal Declaration of Human Rights and the European Convention on Human Rights, although there is a much greater emphasis on the right of self-determination.

=== Chapter II: The Governor ===
The second chapter, which is made up of sections 23–25, states that there shall be a Governor of the Falkland Islands and describes the appointment process for that office. The chapter also sets out how the duties and powers of the Governor are determined, making reference to the role of the Queen through her Secretary of State. Section 24 of the chapter describes the times when an Acting Governor is required and the appointment process for that position.

Sections 25 describes the Governor's role in the defence and internal security of the Falklands, giving him or her great authority in such matters (excluding issues relating to policing) on the advice of the Commander of the British Forces. The chapter also states that, before executing any powers of the office, the Governor must take the oath of allegiance and the oath of office which are both set out in Annex B.

=== Chapter III: The Legislature ===
The third chapter, which is made up of sections 26–36, sets out the structure and composition of the Legislature. The chapter creates the Legislative Assembly of the Falkland Islands (which replaced the Legislative Council of the 1985 constitution) and describes the membership of the Legislative Assembly.

Sections 26(2) lays out the makeup of the Legislative Assembly, stating that it shall consist of eight members elected by universal adult suffrage, the Speaker and two ex officio members (Chief Executive and the Director of Finance). The constituencies of the Legislative Assembly are described in sections 27, which states that five members of the Legislative Assembly will be elected from Stanley and the remaining three from Camp. The section also allows for the number of MLAs from each constituency to be amended but subject to a referendum requiring two-thirds approval from the voters in each constituency.

The qualifications (and disqualifications) for those seeking election to the Legislative Assembly are listed in sections 28 and 29, and the qualifications for electors are listed in section 32. Section 30 describes the circumstances under which a seat in the Legislative Assembly becomes vacant, and section 31 describes the procedure in the event of an MLA being sentenced to imprisonment by a court of law.

The procedure for general elections, as well as the filling of vacant seats between general elections, is set out in section 32, with the dissolution of the Legislative Assembly being described in section 33. Under these sections, the Governor has the power to dissolve the Legislative Assembly at any time, but there must be a general election within 70 days of the dissolution and a general election must take place at least once every four years. If there is a vacant seat in the Legislative Assembly, under section 32(2), there must be a by-election to fill the empty seat within 70 days of the vacancy occurring (unless a dissolution is due within 126 days).

Section 35 gives the Governor the power to recall the Legislative Assembly after its dissolution, but only in the case of an emergency. Section 36 sets out the procedure for resolving any dispute over elections, or membership of the Legislative Assembly, with the Supreme Court of the Falkland Islands having the last word on such issues.

=== Chapter IV: Powers and Procedures of the Legislative Assembly ===
The fourth chapter, which is made up of sections 37–55, lays out the powers and procedures of the Legislative Assembly, giving the Legislative Assembly the power to make laws, describing the sittings, voting and the quorum of the Legislative Assembly, as well as detailing the role and election of the Speaker of the Legislative Assembly of the Falkland Islands.

Section 41 sets out the participation by non-members in proceedings of the Legislative Assembly, stating that the Commander of the British Forces, the Attorney General and any person summoned by the Legislative Assembly are permitted to participate in proceedings, but they are not allowed to vote on any issue of the Assembly.

Members of the Legislative Assembly are granted freedom of speech and expression during the proceedings of the Legislative Assembly in section 49, and the privileges for Legislative Assembly members are detailed in section 48.

The chapter also states that, before taking part in any proceedings of the Legislative Assembly, all members of the Legislative Assembly must take the oath of allegiance and the oath of office which are both set out in Annex B. The Commander of the British Forces and the Attorney General, are only required to take the oath of allegiance before participating in proceedings of the Legislative Assembly.

The Legislative Assembly is given the power to make laws in section 37, and the procedure for making laws is described in sections 50–56. The Governor has the power to give royal assent to any law passed by the Legislative Assembly, and can also disallow any law and reserve any Bill but in both cases must inform the Secretary of State, who can prevent such action.

=== Chapter V: The Executive ===
The structure and powers of the executive is laid out in the fifth chapter, which is made up of sections 56–73. The chapter states that executive authority in the Falkland Islands is vested in the King and is exercised on his behalf by the governor.

Section 57 sets up the Executive Council of the Falkland Islands, to advise the governor on the execution of executive power. The chapter also lays out the qualifications required for membership of the Executive Council as well as the election, tenure and quorum of the Executive Council. Sections 60-63 describes the procedure for the calling and holding of Executive Council meetings, and section 69 requires minutes to be taken at each meeting. Section 64 states that, before executing any powers of the Executive Council, Councillors must take the oath of secrecy which is set out in Annex B.

Under sections 66 and 67, the Governor is permitted to go against the wishes of the Executive Council, and act without consulting them. If the governor takes action against the wishes of the Executive Council, the governor must immediately inform the Secretary of State on the reasons for such action.

Section 70 sets up an Advisory Committee on the Prerogative of Mercy, and describes its makeup and powers. Section 71 gives the governor the power to grant pardons on the advice of the Advisory Committee. Section 72 details the role of the Attorney General in relation to criminal proceedings.

=== Chapter VI: Finance ===
The sixth chapter, which is made up of sections 74–81, describes the powers of the Government of the Falkland Islands over the public finances. The chapter sets up a Consolidated Fund for the storage of public funds, and section 75 describes the procedure for withdrawals from the Consolidated Fund.

Section 76 describes the role of the Director of Finance of the Falkland Islands who lays out the revenues and expenditure of the islands which then must be authorised by the Legislative Assembly. Section 78 sets up a Contingencies Fund, to be used in the event of an urgent and unforeseen need for expenditure. Use of the fund requires the approval of the Legislative Assembly via an appropriation Bill. A Public Accounts Committee is set up by section 81, which also describes the membership, election and powers of the committee.

=== Chapter VII: The Public Service ===
The seventh chapter, which is made up of sections 82–85, states that there shall be a Chief Executive of the Falkland Islands and describes the appointment process for that office. The Chief Executive is appointed by the Governor on the advice of the Executive Council and the main duty of the Chief Executive is to head of the public service. Section 84 states that appointments to such public offices, which are vested in the Governor, can be delegated to the Chief Executive.

Section 85 describes the procedure for the disciplining and removal from office of public officials.

=== Chapter VIII: The Administration of Justice ===
The eighth chapter, which is made up of sections 86–94, sets out the structure and composition of the judiciary. Section 86 creates the Supreme Court of the Falkland Islands and gives it unlimited jurisdiction to hear and determine any civil or criminal proceedings. Under section 86(2), the Supreme Court consists of the Chief Justice of the Falkland Islands who is determined by section 89.

The Court of Appeal is set up by section 87 and consists of a President and two Justices of Appeal. The section goes on to describe the powers and duties of the Court, and sections 93 and 94 set out the Court's practice and procedure. Sections 88-90 details the appointment, powers and tenure of the Judges, Acting Judges and the Senior Magistrate. The chapter also states that, before executing any powers of their offices, all judicial officials must take the oath of allegiance and the judicial oath which are both set out in Annex B.

=== Chapter IX: Complaints Commissioner ===
The ninth chapter, which is made up of sections 95 and 96, lays out the procedure appointment of a Complaints Commissioner and describes its process and function. Under section 95, the Governor has the right to appoint a Complaints Commissioner to investigate any complaint about the Government of the Falkland Islands.

The Commissioner cannot be a member of the Legislative Assembly and once appointed, the Commissioner cannot be subject to the direction or control of any other person or authority.

=== Chapter X: Miscellaneous ===
The tenth and final chapter, which is made up of sections 97–100, describes the Public Seal as well as the procedure for reappointments, concurrent appointments and resignations of any office or post established by the constitution.

Section 100 gives a list of terms, used in the constitution, with their official interpretations.

=== Annexes ===
Annex A details the rules for the enactment of laws. Annex B gives the wording of the oaths and affirmations mandated by the constitution, which are the oath and affirmation of allegiance, the oath and affirmation for due execution of office, the oath and affirmation of Secrecy, and the Judicial oath and affirmation.

== Argentina ==
The new constitution was protested against by Argentina, which claims the Falklands to be part of its territory. Jorge Taiana, the Foreign Minister of Argentina, described the constitution as a "violation of Argentine sovereignty and international law", saying that "the sole objective being pursued by the United Kingdom in approving what it calls reforms is to perpetuate an anachronistic colonial situation."
