= Legislative Council of the Falkland Islands =

- Unicameral

History
- Founded: 13 November 1845
- Disbanded: 1 January 2009
- Preceded by: Privy Council of the United Kingdom
- Succeeded by: Legislative Assembly of the Falkland Islands

Leadership
- Presiding officer: Governor (1845–2002); Speaker (2002–2009)

Elections
- First election: February 1949
- Last election: 17 November 2005

Meeting place
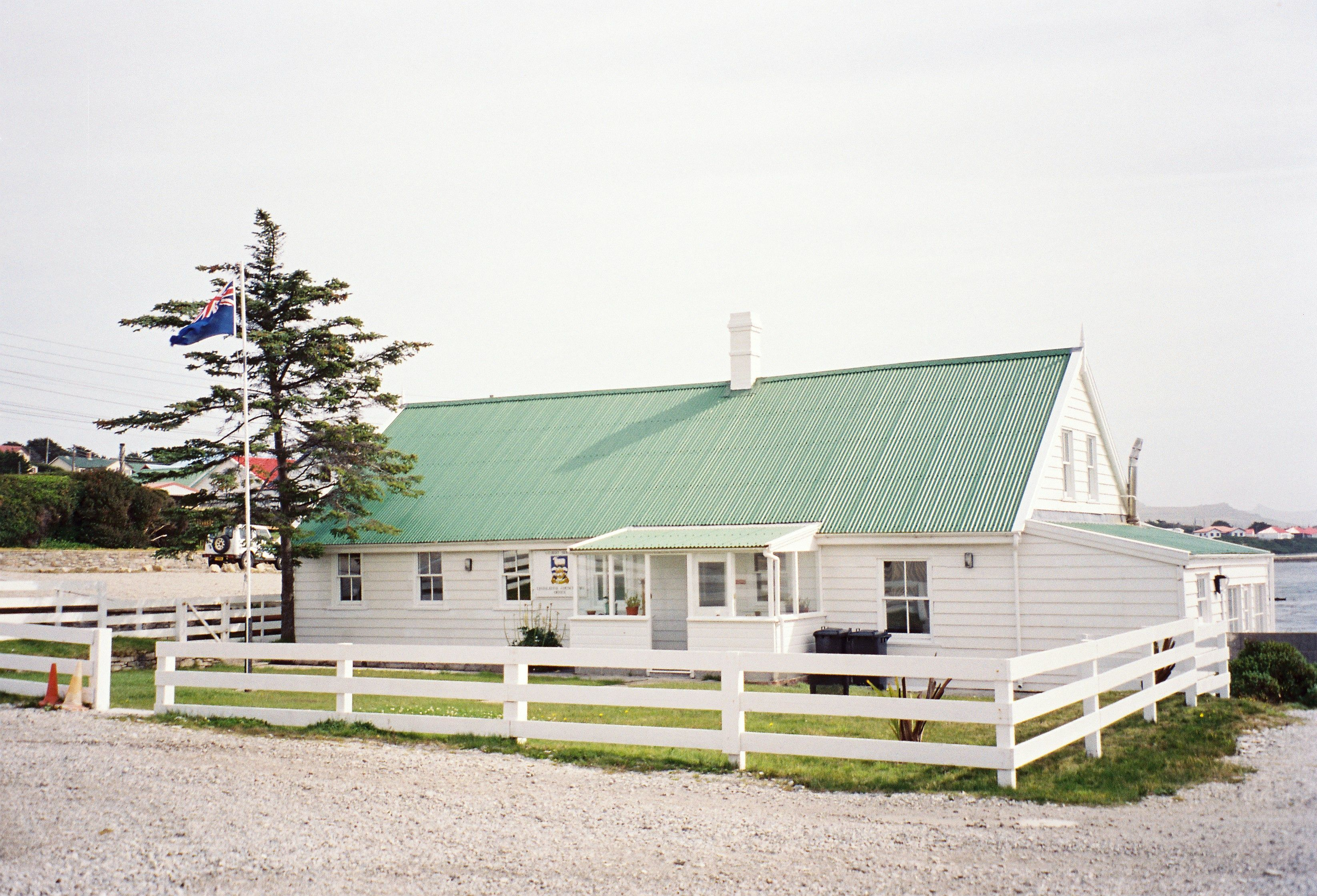
- Gilbert House, Stanley, Falkland Islands

The Legislative Council of the Falkland Islands (sometimes referred to as LEGCO) was the unicameral legislature of the Falkland Islands from 13 November 1845 until 1 January 2009. The new constitution came into force in 2009 and replaced the Legislative Council with the Legislative Assembly of the Falkland Islands.

== History ==
Immediately following the United Kingdom's re-establishment of rule over the Falklands in 1833, the islands were under military law by Naval Administrators appointed by the Admiralty. In the early 1840s, colonists from the UK began to settle on the islands which led Lord Stanley, Secretary of State for the Colonies, to seek authorisation from Parliament to establish a legislative power on the Falklands.

On 13 November 1845 Richard Moody, the first Governor of the Falkland Islands, formally inaugurated the Legislative Council in the newly founded town of Stanley. An Executive Council having been inaugurated on 2 April 1845. Suffrage was limited, with much of the membership of the Legislative Council being appointed by the Governor.

There were only minor changes made to the Legislative Council over the next century, but in 1948 the Privy Council passed the Falkland Islands (Legislative Council) Order 1948, which introduced universal suffrage to the islands by creating a new Legislative Council consisting of the Governor, acting as Presiding officer, two ex officio officers (the Chief Secretary and the Financial Secretary), four appointed members and four elected members. The new constitution came into force on 4 March 1949, with the first election taking place the same year. In 1964 the number of appointed members was reduced to two and in 1977 the remaining appointed members were replaced by two additional elected members, giving the elected members a majority of the seats.

The Argentine military junta invaded the Falklands on 2 April 1982, starting the Falklands War. During their military occupation of the islands, the Argentine government shut-down the Legislative Council and deported several of its elected members (most notably Bill Luxton and his family), describing them as potential troublemakers. British forces liberated the Falkland Islanders from Argentine occupation on 14 June 1982, with civilian rule being restored on 25 June with the return of Governor Rex Hunt.

On 18 April 1985 the Falkland Islands Constitution Order 1985 came into force which increased the number elected members of the Council to eight and in 1997 the constitution was amended with regard to voters rights. In 2002 the Falkland Islands became a British Overseas Territory and the Governor was replaced as Presiding officer by the newly created office of Speaker of the Legislative Council. A new constitution came into force on 1 January 2009, which replaced the Legislative Council with the more powerful Legislative Assembly.

== Powers and composition ==
Under the 1985 constitution, the Governor, with the advice and consent of the Legislative Council, could make laws for "the peace, order and good government of the Falkland Islands". The Legislative Council consisted of eight elected members (five from Stanley and three from Camp) and two ex officio members (the Chief Executive and the Financial Secretary). Elections to the Legislative Council had to take place at least once every four years.
