= Legislative Assembly of the Falkland Islands =

Legislature of the Falkland Islands Government (FIG)

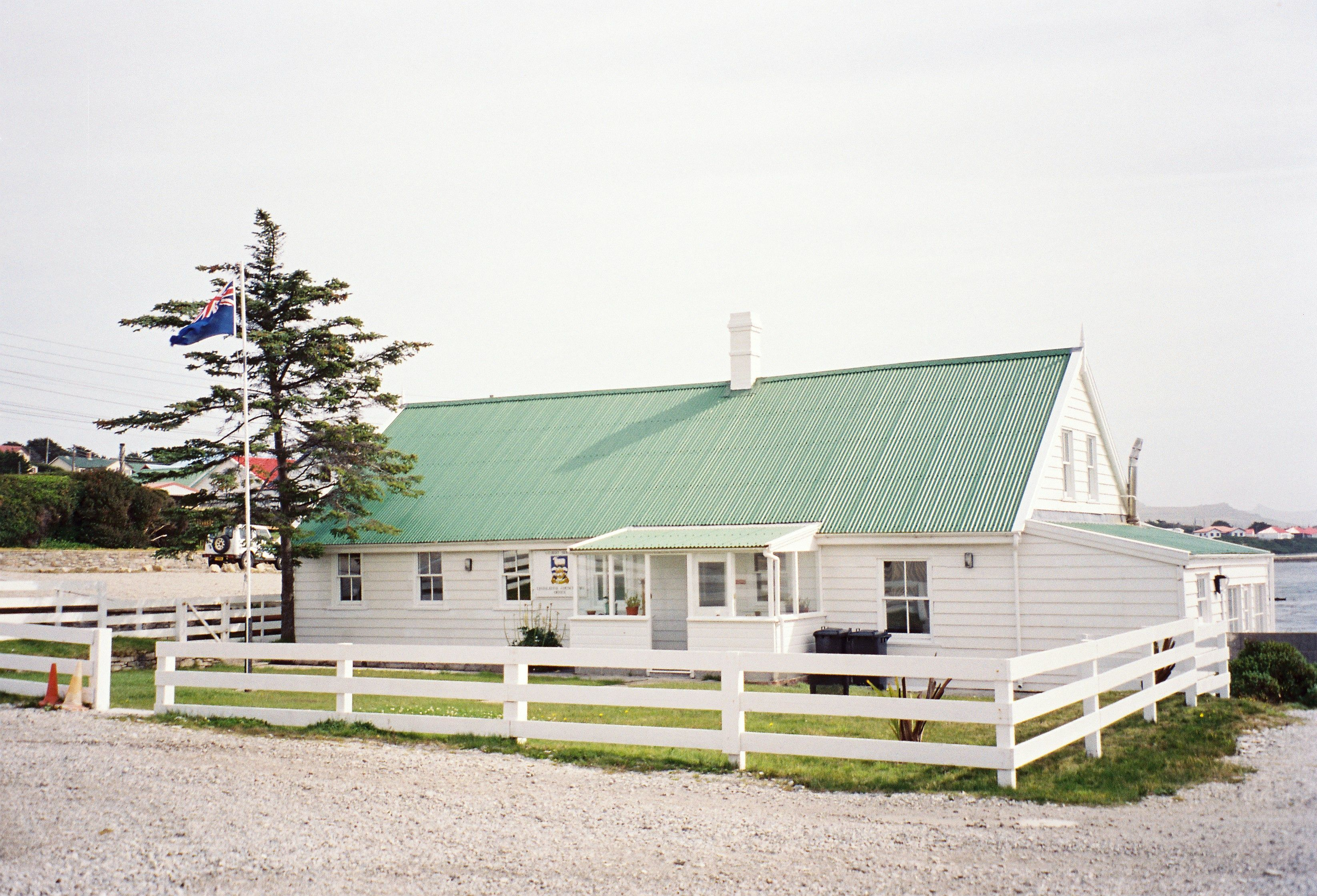
- The office of the Legislative Assembly (Gilbert House)

Type
- Type: Unicameral
- Term limits: 4 years

History
- Founded: 1 January 2009
- Preceded by: Legislative Council of the Falkland Islands

Leadership
- Speaker: Keith Biles (Non-affiliated)

Structure
- Seats: 12 (8 elected, 3 non-voting ex officio members, 1 speaker)
- Political groups: Nonpartisan: 11 seats

Elections
- Voting system: Block voting
- Last election: 11 December 2025
- Next election: before 24 January 2030

Meeting place
- Stanley Town Hall, Stanley, Falkland Islands

Website
- assembly.gov.fk

The Legislative Assembly of the Falkland Islands is the unicameral legislature of the British Overseas Territory of the Falkland Islands. The Legislative Assembly replaced the Legislative Council (which had existed since 1845) when the new Constitution of the Falklands came into force in 2009 and laid out the composition, powers and procedures of the islands' legislature.

The Legislative Assembly consists of eight elected members, the clerk of Assembly, two ex officio members (the Chief Executive and the Financial Secretary), and the Speaker. Although they take part in proceedings, the ex officio members do not have the right to vote in the Legislative Assembly. The Attorney General and the Commander British Forces also has the right to take part in the proceedings of the Legislative Assembly, though again they may not vote.

== Powers and role ==
Meetings of the Legislative Assembly are normally held in the Court and Assembly Chamber in Stanley Town Hall and begin at a time appointed by the Governor. The constitution states there must be at least one meeting of the Legislative Assembly every year, although the Assembly normally meets every month. Meetings of the Legislative Assembly are broadcast live on the local radio station, the Falkland Islands Radio Service.

The members of the Legislative Assembly (MLAs) have office facilities at Sulivan House, Stanley. They moved there in January 2026 from their old offices at Gilbert House, Stanley.

The constitution gives the Legislative Assembly legislative powers for "the peace, order and good government of the Falkland Islands." Any MLA may introduce a bill or propose any motion for debate. However, the Legislative Assembly is not permitted to propose a bill which makes alterations to the taxes or finances on the Islands, unless given permission to do so by the Governor, as this is the remit of the Director of Finance and the Public Accounts Committee who are elected by the Legislative Assembly and whose proposals are voted on by the Legislative Assembly. Most motions in the Assembly, including bills, are passed by a simple majority of the elected members with the presiding officer having the casting vote.

The presiding officer of the Assembly is the Speaker (or the Deputy Speaker in the Speaker's absence) who is elected by the MLAs. Unlike the Speaker of the House of Commons, the Speaker of the Legislative Assembly does not need to be a member of the Assembly. The Speaker and the Deputy Speaker are elected for the life of the Legislative Assembly though can be removed via a motion of no confidence voted for by six or more MLAs. During the Speaker election, the Attorney General acts as presiding officer.

The Assembly is governed by a number of standing orders which lay out the regulations for proceedings during Assembly meetings. Also, MLAs are granted parliamentary privilege in the proceedings of the Legislative Assembly. There is also a Clerk of the Legislative Assembly who has a similar role to that of the Clerk of the House of Commons.

Since the 2013 general election MLAs have been paid a salary, rather than just expenses, and are expected to work full-time, giving up whatever jobs or business interests they may have previously held.

== Elections ==
There must be a general election on the Falklands at least once every four years, although there can be an election at any time. As in most Westminster systems, the election campaign officially begins with the dissolution of the legislature. In the Falklands the Governor dissolves the Legislative Assembly by proclamation at the request of the Executive Council. There must be an election within 70 days of the dissolution and the Governor retains the power to recall a dissolved Legislative Assembly before the election, though only in the event of an emergency.

The Falkland Islands are divided into two constituencies, Camp and Stanley. Camp returns three elected members and Stanley returns five elected members using block voting. The Stanley constituency consists of the area within 3.5 mi (5.6 km) of the spire of Christ Church Cathedral, Stanley, while the Camp constituency consists of the rest of the Territory. The Constitution allows for the constituencies and their boundaries to be amended, but such an amendment must be agreed to by two-thirds of the vote in a referendum of the islanders.

Anyone aged eighteen years or over on the date of the election and registered to vote in the Falklands qualifies to be elected as a member of the Legislative Assembly in the constituency where they are registered. The Legislative Assembly is elected through universal suffrage, which means that a person can vote if they are eighteen years or over on the date of the election, have Falkland Islands status, are a British citizen, a British Overseas Territories citizen or a British Overseas citizen, and are a resident in the Falkland Islands on the date of the election.

Someone can lose their right to vote if they have been certified insane or of unsound mind under any law, if they are serving a sentence of imprisonment for a term of at least twelve months, if they have been convicted of an offence relating to elections, or if they have any acknowledgement of allegiance, obedience or adherence to a foreign power or state. Regular members of His Majesty's Armed Forces are also not allowed to vote.

If there is any dispute over the election of the Assembly, or the validity of anyone to vote or stand for election, the Supreme Court of the Falkland Islands has the jurisdiction to resolve the dispute.

=== By-elections ===
If an elected member of the Legislative Assembly vacates their seat for any reason other than a dissolution of the Assembly, there is a by-election to fill the empty seat. The by-election must be held within 70 days the vacancy occurring, unless the Assembly is due to be dissolved within 126 days.

== Current composition ==
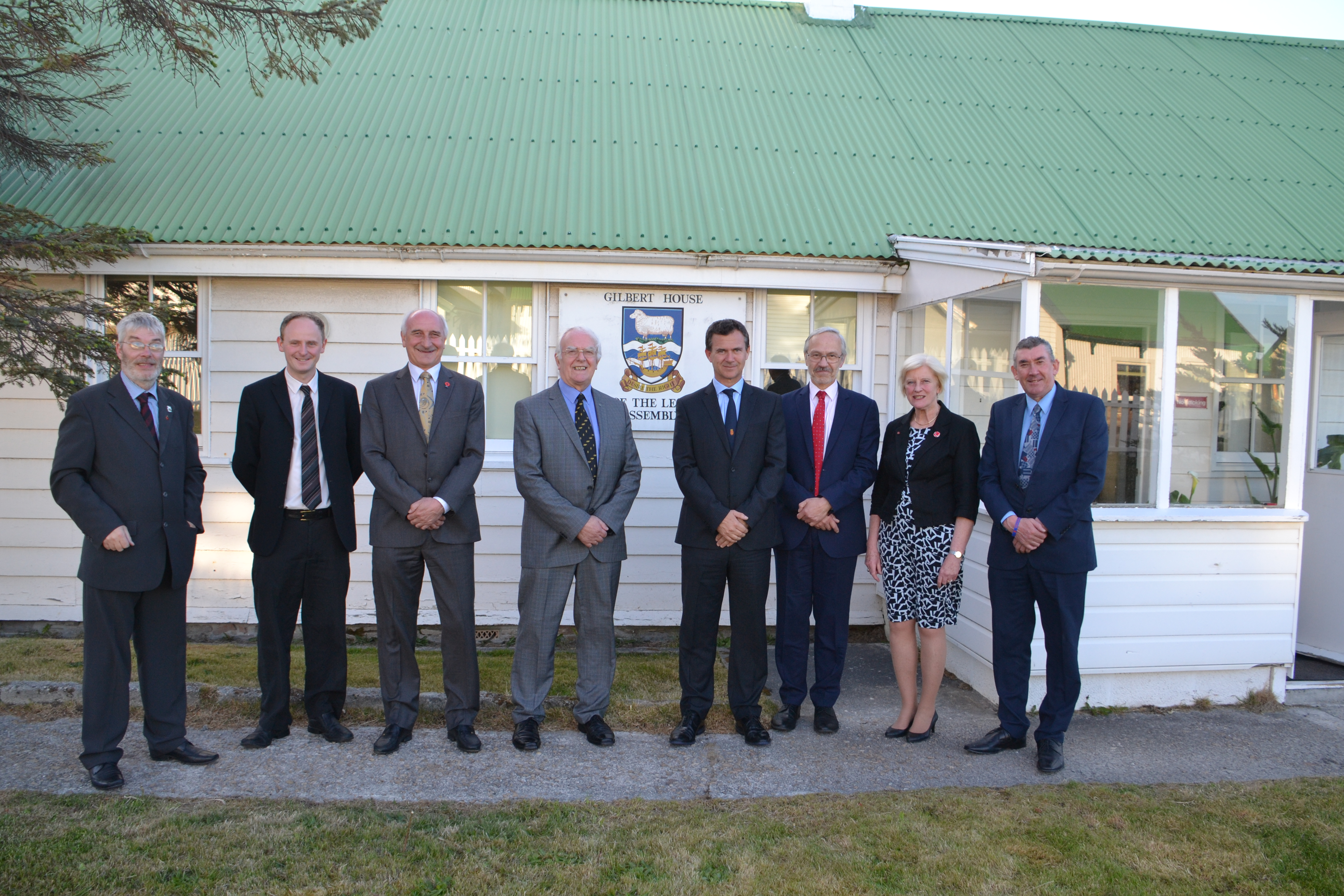
Members of the Falkland Islands Legislative Assembly and Mark Lancaster TD MP in November 2016.

The last election took place on 11 December 2025 and the next election is due to take place no later than 2030. As no political parties are active on the Islands, non-partisans were elected at the most recent election.

=== Elected members ===
Member	Constituency	Votes
Lewis Clifton	Stanley	844
Dean Dent	Stanley	701
Cheryl Roberts	Stanley	694
Stacy Bragger	Stanley	635
Roger Spink	Stanley	555
Jack Ford	Camp	185
Dot Gould	Camp	171
Michael Goss	Camp	126

=== Officials ===
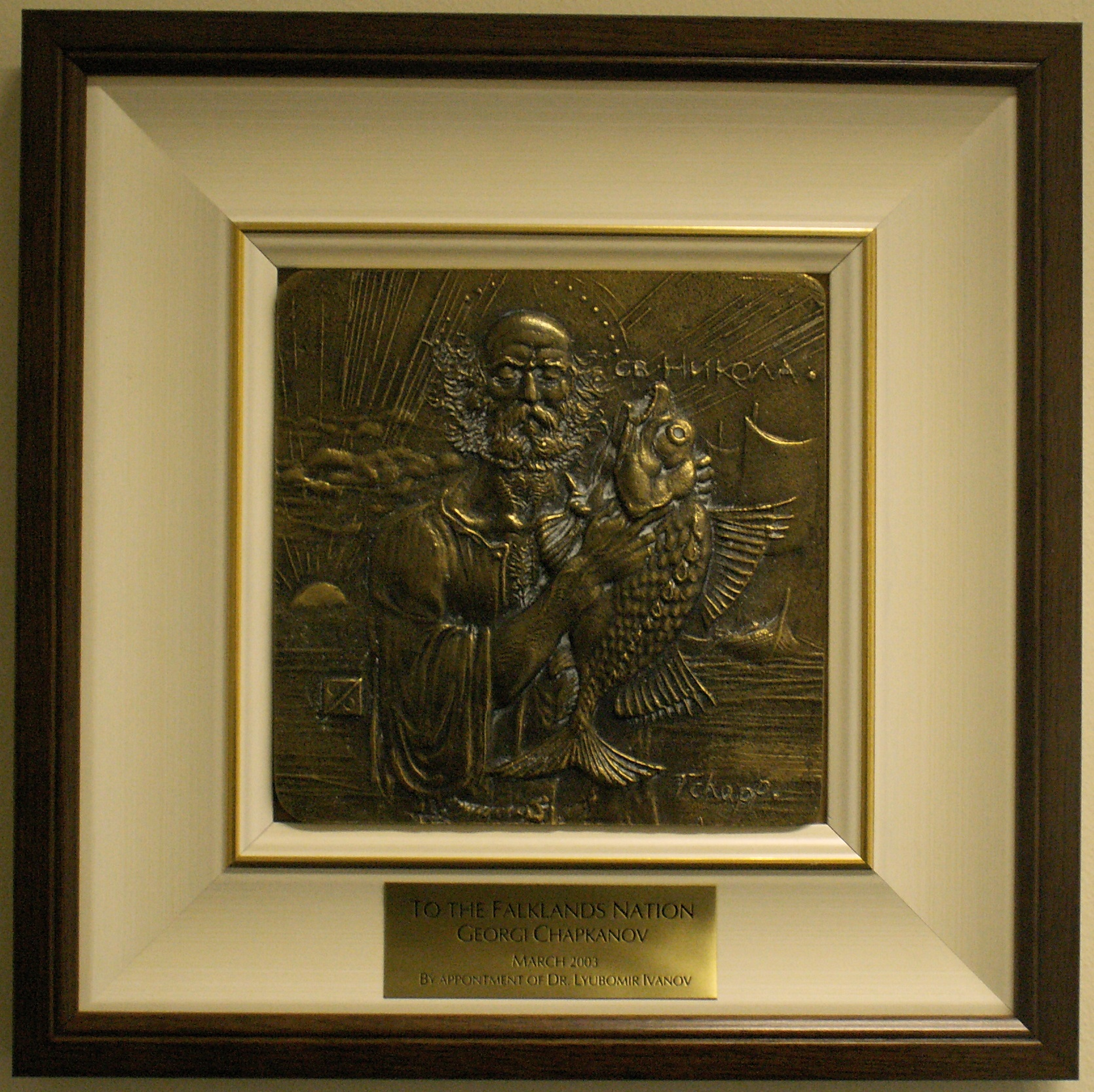
Icon of St. Nicholas at Gilbert House. He is a protector of fishermen and by extension of the Falklands fisheries.

The Directorates are paid employees, members of the Corporate Management Team, the principal civil servants of the Assembly.

Member	Office
Andrea Clausen	Chief Executive
Pat Clunie	Director of Finance
Keith Biles	Speaker
Simon Young	Attorney General

=== Speakers ===
Name	Entered office	Left office
None (The Governor of the Falkland Islands)	1845	2002
Lionel Geoffrey 'Tim' Blake	2002	2005
Darwin Lewis Clifton	November 2005	February 2009
Keith Biles	27 February 2009	Present

== Oath or affirmation ==
Under section 42 of the constitution, before entering upon the functions of their office, the MLAs must take the oath of allegiance and the oath of office. The wording for the oath of office is specified in Annex B to the Constitution:

"I, name, do swear (or solemnly affirm) that I will well and truly serve His Majesty King Charles the Third, His Heirs and Successors, and the people of the Falkland Islands, and will uphold the Constitution and other laws in force in the Falkland Islands, as a member of the Legislative Assembly. So help me God."

== Committees ==
The committees of the Legislative Assembly of the Falkland Islands include:

- Public Accounts Committee (PAC) – Examines government finances, public expenditure, and audit reports
- Standing Orders Committee – Reviews and recommends changes to the Assembly's rules and procedures
- House Committee – Oversees the administration and operation of the Legislative Assembly
- Constitution Select Committee – Considers constitutional matters and possible constitutional reforms
- Legislation Select Committee – Examines bills, draft laws, and legislative matters referred to it by the Assembly
- Privileges Committee – Deals with parliamentary privilege and matters affecting Assembly members and proceedings
- Records Committee – Oversees the management and preservation of Assembly records and official documents
- Advisory Committee on the Prerogative of Mercy – Advises the Governor on pardons, sentence reductions, and other exercises of mercy

In addition, the Legislative Assembly may establish Special Select Committees to investigate specific issues or conduct inquiries when required.

=== Advisory Committee on the Prerogative of Mercy ===
The Governor has the power to grant a pardon to any person concerned in or convicted of an offence, but the Governor can only use this power after consultation with the Advisory Committee on the Prerogative of Mercy. The Committee consist of two elected members of the Legislative Assembly (appointed by the Governor on the advice of the Legislative Assembly), the Chief Executive, the Attorney General and the Chief Medical Officer.

==== Members ====
- Jack Ford — Member of the Legislative Assembly (Camp Constituency)
- Lewis Clifton — Member of the Legislative Assembly (Stanley Constituency)
- Andrea Clausen — Chief Executive
- Simon Young — Attorney General
- Dr Rebecca "Beccy" Edwards — Chief Medical Officer

There is no official chair of the Advisory Committee on the Prerogative of Mercy.

=== Legislation Select Committee ===
The Legislation Select Committee of the Legislative Assembly of the Falkland Islands examines bills, draft laws, regulations, and other legislative matters referred to it by the Legislative Assembly. It reviews proposed legislation, considers its legal and practical implications, and makes recommendations to the Assembly. The committee helps ensure that laws are thoroughly scrutinised and improved before they are debated and enacted.

==== Members ====
The current members of the Legislation Select Committee of the Legislative Assembly of the Falkland Islands are:

- Jack Ford — Chair
- Lewis Clifton — Member
- Cheryl Roberts — Member
- Roger Spink — Member

=== Constitution Select Committee ===
The Constitution Select Committee of the Legislative Assembly of the Falkland Islands reviews constitutional matters and considers proposals for constitutional reform. It examines the territory's system of government, electoral arrangements, and the relationship between the Falkland Islands and the United Kingdom, making recommendations to the Legislative Assembly on potential constitutional changes.

==== Members ====
- Mark Pollard — Chair
- Jack Ford — Member
- Leona Roberts — Member
- Roger Spink — Member
