= Les Gleadell =

Governor of the Falkland Islands

Leslie Gleadell OBE, JP

Governor of the Falkland Islands Acting
- In office September 1966 – October 1966
- Monarch: Elizabeth II
- Preceded by: Cosmo Haskard
- Succeeded by: Cosmo Haskard

Personal details
- Born: 14 January 1921 Doctor's Creek, Fox Bay, Falkland Islands
- Died: 13 June 2009 (aged 88) Auckland, New Zealand
- Spouses: Mildred Lees (m. 1951); Vera Beal (m. 1961)
- Children: Graham; Lois; Stephen

Military service
- Allegiance: United Kingdom
- Branch/service: Falkland Islands Defence Force

Leslie Charles Gleadell OBE, JP (14 January 1921 – 13 June 2009) was a Falkland Islands civil servant who served in various roles for the Falkland Islands Government including as acting Governor during the Aerolineas Argentinas hijacking incident in 1966, for which he is best remembered.

== Early life ==
A third generation islander descended from a Lincolnshire family, Gleadell was born in Doctor's Creek, Fox Bay on West Falkland to Franklin Gleadell and Winifred Gleadell, née Davis. He was schooled in Stanley and left when he was 15 years old. After school he worked for Penguin News and then joined the Electricity and Telegraphs Department as a clerk. He became a member of the Falkland Islands Defence Force when he was 18 and during the Second World War he worked as a signalman at Sapper Hill and on board patrol ships.

After studying accountancy via a correspondence course, Gleadell became clerk to Colonial Auditor Robert Boumphrey in 1947 and was then posted to the Colonial Audit Office in London and Gibraltar. He returned to the Falklands as Colonial Auditor in 1950 and married Mildred Lees, with whom he had a son, Graham. In 1959 he was promoted to Colonial Treasurer, the first islander to hold the post, and in 1961 he married his second wife, Vera Beal, with whom he had two children - Lois born in 1962 and Stephen born in 1964.

== Aerolineas Argentinas hijacking incident ==
In September 1966 Governor Cosmo Haskard was ordered to London for consultations and Colonial Secretary Harry Thompson (who would have normally deputised for the Governor) was on leave, meaning Gleadell was sworn in as Acting Governor. He later joked that he "enjoyed the fastest promotion in the colony's history, from private to commander-in-chief in one day".

On 28 September 1966, Aerolineas Argentinas Flight 648 was hijacked en route from Buenos Aires to Rio Gallegos in Argentina by a group of Argentine nationalists and flown to the Falkland Islands where the hijackers took several Islanders hostage and claimed the islands to be Argentine territory. As acting Governor, Gleadell negotiated with the hijackers via a Spanish-speaking Catholic priest from St. Mary's Church, Father Rodolfo Roel. Fearing ordinary islanders might attempt to free the hostages by force, one of Gleadell's first acts was to prevent the armoury issuing any weapons to members of the public, insisting that only members of the defence force should be armed. Gleadell kept the UK government in London updated via telegram and after two days, the hijackers agreed to release the hostages and in return were deported to Argentina for trial (as they did not recognise the British authorities on the islands). As the hijackers departed the Falklands, Gleadell reportedly said "Well, I think I'm going to send a telegram saying I am going to sleep" as he had spent the previous four nights in his office.

== Later life ==
Gleadell was praised for his handling of the hijacking and was made an Officer of the Order of the British Empire by Queen Elizabeth II at the 1967 New Year Honours. However, his involvement in the incident made him infamous in Argentine and he was pursued by the Argentina press in 1967 during a trip to Montevideo, where he had travelled for surgery to remove an ulcer. A few years later, whilst part of a trade delegation to mainland South America, a warrant was issued for his arrest in Tierra del Fuego on charges of 'deprivation of freedom, public intimidation, rebellion and theft', forcing him to return to the Falklands via Chile.

Fearing for his children's safety (who were due to be educated in Argentina), in 1972 Gleadell and his family left the Falklands and emigrated to New Zealand, where he took up work as an accountant for a hardware store. He retired in the 1980s and died in Auckland on 13 June 2009.
