= Aerolíneas Argentinas Flight 648 (1966) =

1966 aviation incident

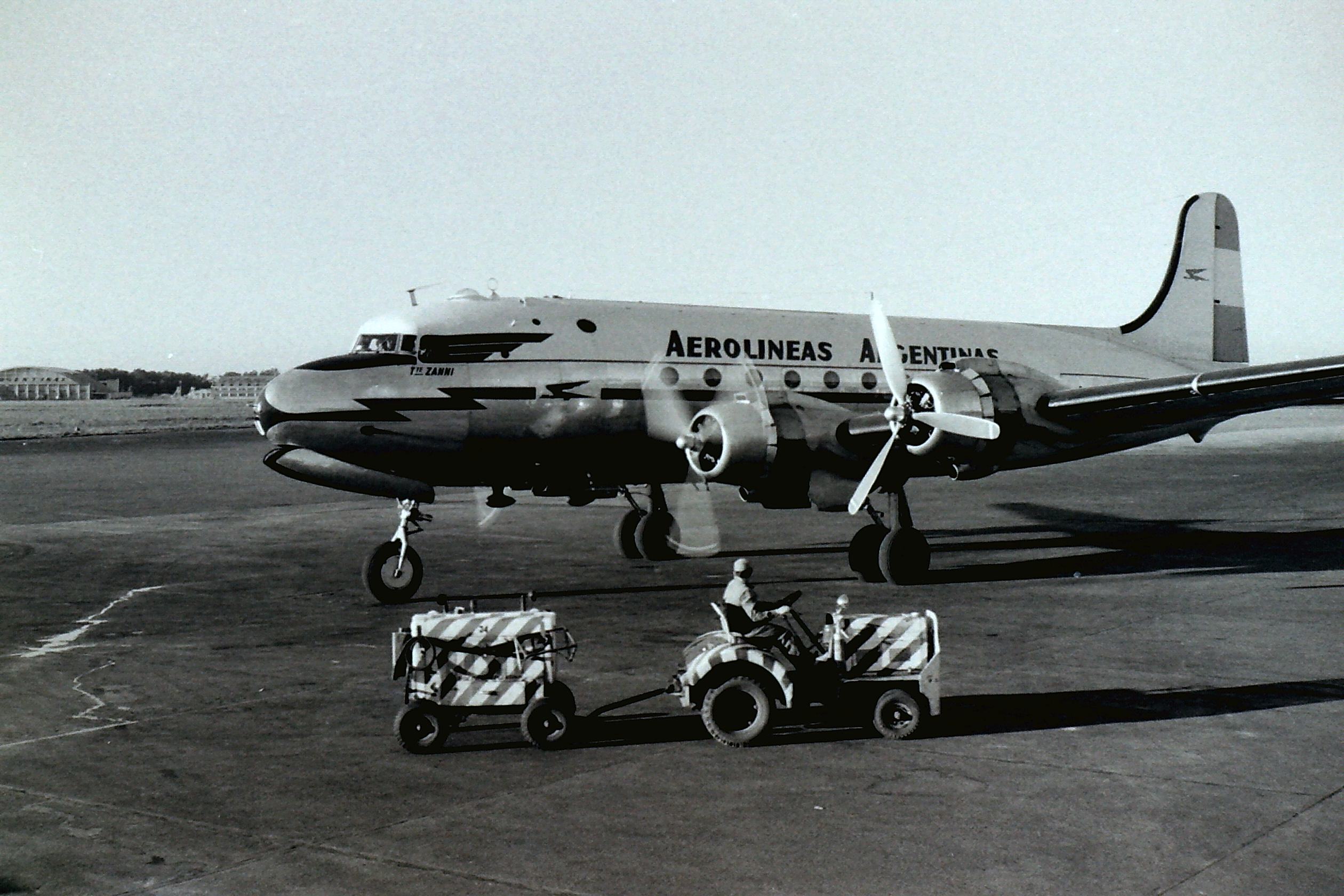
- An Aerolíneas Argentinas Douglas DC-4 similar to the hijacked aircraft

Hijacking
- Date: 28–29 September 1966
- Summary: Aircraft hijacking
- Site: Stanley Racecourse, Stanley, Falkland Islands; 51°41′31″S 57°52′52″W

Aircraft
- Aircraft type: Douglas DC-4
- Aircraft name: Teniente Benjamin Matienzo
- Operator: Aerolíneas Argentinas
- Registration: LV-AGG
- Flight origin: Ezeiza International Airport, Buenos Aires, Argentina
- Destination: Piloto Civil Norberto Fernández International Airport, Río Gallegos, Argentina
- Passengers: 32
- Crew: 6
- Fatalities: 0
- Survivors: 38 (including 18 hijackers)

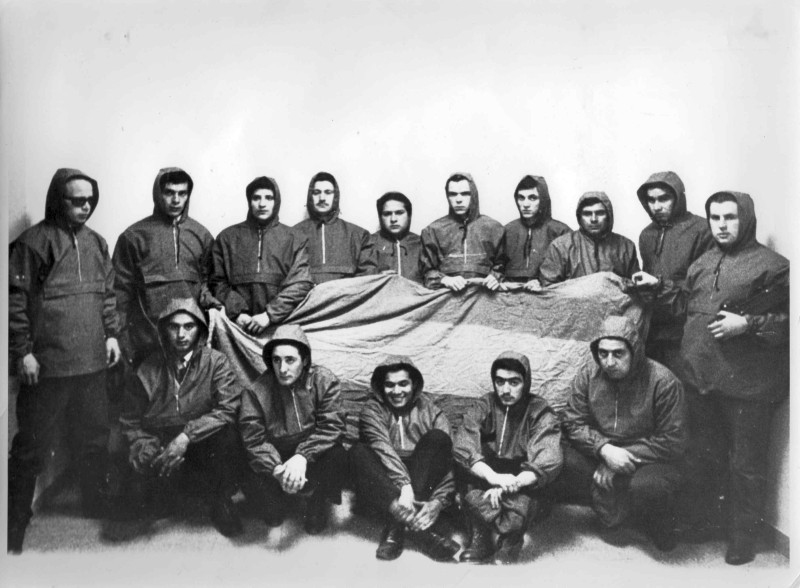
Members of Operativo Cóndor posing with an Argentine flag, 1966

The hijacking of Aerolíneas Argentinas Flight 648, also known as Operativo Cóndor ("Operation Condor") occurred on 28 and 29 September 1966 when a group of Argentine nationalists hijacked a civilian Aerolíneas Argentinas aircraft en route from Buenos Aires to Río Gallegos and forced the captain at gunpoint to land in the Falkland Islands (then a British Crown Colony) in protest to the UK's presence on the islands. After landing, the hijackers raised the Argentine flag, took several islanders hostage and demanded the Governor of the Falkland Islands recognise Argentine sovereignty over the islands. On 29 September 1966, after negotiating through a Catholic priest, the hijackers surrendered and were returned to Argentina for trial.

== Background ==
The United Kingdom had exercised de facto sovereignty over the Falkland Islands continuously since 1833, but the Argentinean government claimed sovereignty over the archipelago (known in Argentina as the "Malvinas") and in 1964 Ambassador José María Ruda presented Argentina's case to the United Nations Special Committee on Decolonization which increased the Argentinean public's interest in the sovereignty claim.

To coincide with Ruda's address, on 8 September 1964 Argentine civil pilot Miguel Lawler Fitzgerald flew his Cessna 185 from Río Gallegos to Stanley, in the Falkland Islands, and landed on the racecourse. He hoisted the Argentine ensign and asked to speak with the governor. When his request was refused, he left a written message claiming Argentine sovereignty before taking off and returning to Río Gallegos. As a result of this incident, the UK sent a permanent detachment of Royal Marines to the Falklands.

In the early 1960s the Tacuara Nationalist Movement (an Argentine far-right militant group) conducted a number of bank robberies in Argentina. With some of these funds, Horacio Rossi (a member of the group) proposed chartering a ship from Bahía Blanca and sailing it to Stanley with twenty or thirty militants who would invade the Falklands, force out the population and then offer the Islands to the exiled former-president of Argentina, Juan Perón to use as a base for his return to Argentina. The plan was named "Operation Rivero" but was never executed; however, Tacuara members Dardo Cabo and Alejandro Giovenco would go on to use some details of the plan in "Operation Condor".

== Flight ==
=== Take-off ===
On 28 September 1966, 18 militant Peronists and nationalists (who called themselves Operativo Cóndor) boarded an Aerolíneas Argentinas Douglas DC-4 (tail number: LV-AGG) along with 14 other passengers and 6 crew. Flight 648 departed from Buenos Aires at 00:34 bound for Rio Gallegos, Santa Cruz. The militant group were dressed as university students, manual labourers, and white-collar workers. Some met for the first time on the aircraft.

The militants included:

- Dardo Cabo, the leader of the group, journalist and son of trade unionist Armando Cabo (25 years old)
- María Cristina Verrier, playwright and journalist (27 years old), daughter of César Verrier (Supreme Court of Justice judge and government official under former president Arturo Frondizi)

The group had initially planned to purchase all the seats on board the flight, but this option was too expensive for their limited budget. So instead they chose to join the same flight as Rear Admiral Jose Maria Guzman (unaware of the plan) who was the then governor of the National Territory of Tierra del Fuego Province, under whose jurisdiction the Falklands fall according to Argentina's sovereignty claim to the Islands. Héctor Ricardo García, owner of the Buenos Aires newspaper Crónica, was also a passenger having been invited to witness the operation by the militants. He claimed he did not know the details of the plan but in fact he was a key promoter. Two years earlier, his paper had offered to support Miguel Lawler Fitzgerald's flight to the Falklands.

=== Hijacking and landing ===
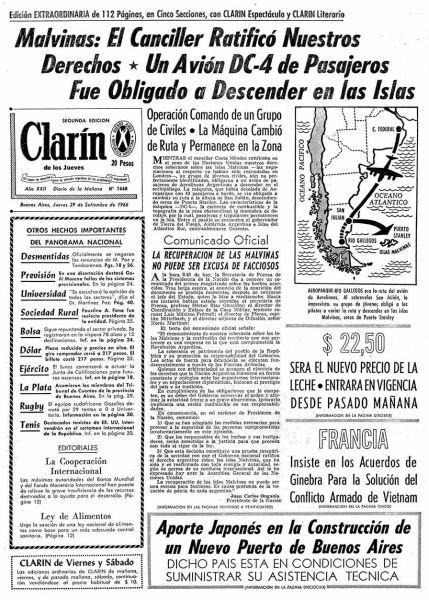
Reporting in the newspaper Clarín

At around 06:00, when flying over the city of Puerto Santa Cruz, members of the group took out firearms hidden in their luggage. Two hijackers moved to the back of the aircraft and locked the flight purser in the toilet. Dardo Cabo, the leader of the group, and Alejandro Giovenco entered the cockpit and ordered Captain Ernesto Fernández García at gunpoint to fly to the Falklands. Captain Fernández García initially claimed that there wasn't enough fuel and that he did not know the correct route but finally complied with their demands when Cabo said the captain's family would be "taken care of" if he didn't change course. Two members of the group approached Admiral Guzmán in the cabin and informed him of the hijacking, at which point his aide-de-camp attempted to get his pistol but was struck down by one of the hijackers. In order not to frighten the passengers, they were informed that the aircraft was diverting to Comodoro Rivadavia airport.

The captain managed to find the Falklands thanks to the differences in the pattern of cloud cover over the islands. After circling, they were able to locate Stanley through a clearing in the clouds. At that time, there were no active airports on the islands, so the captain landed on Stanley Racecourse at 08:42. The aircraft was slightly damaged as a result of the landing and the right undercarriage sank into a peat bog at end of the landing run.

The hijackers opened the doors, descended to the ground using ropes and hoisted seven Argentine flags in front of the aircraft. They then announced they were claiming the islands for Argentina and that Stanley would be renamed "Puerto Rivero" after Antonio Rivero, an Argentine gaucho who murdered five people at Port Louis on the Falkland Islands in 1833.

The original plan was to storm Government House (which was next to the racecourse) immediately after landing and compel the Governor of the Falkland Islands (who was actually absent on that day) to recognise Argentine sovereignty over the islands. The hope was that this would lead to a nationalist wave in Argentina which would force Argentina's government into ordering a full invasion and takeover of the islands. However, the aircraft had come to a stop on the wrong end of the race track and was unable to move, meaning the hijackers couldn't get to Government House without being easily captured.

== Hostage taking ==
Several Falkland Islanders, who had witnessed the landing and assumed the aircraft was in distress, came to help and were taken hostage. The hijackers distributed a proclamation written in English, stating that the islands were Argentine territory. The aircraft was quickly surrounded by the Falkland Islands Defence Force, the Falkland Islands Police and Royal Marines.

Governor Cosmo Haskard was absent from the Falklands at the time, as was Colonial Secretary Harry Thompson (who would have normally deputised for the governor). As a result, Colonial Treasurer Leslie Gleadell took charge of the situation. Gleadell received three of the hijackers, escorted by Captain Ian Martin the officer commanding the Royal Marines, and urged them to surrender, but the hijackers insisted that as Argentine citizens, they had a right to be in the islands. An agreement was reached under which all the hostages aboard the aircraft would be exchanged for seven men, including Police sergeant Terry Peck.

The hostages were then allowed to disembark and sent to lodge with local families, as the islands had no hotel at that time. On being taken past Government House (the residence of the governor), Admiral Guzmán joked "Mi casa" ("my house").

At the request of the hijackers, Catholic priest Father Rodolfo Roel (a priest of the Saint Joseph's Missionary Society of Mill Hill of Dutch origin) held a Mass in Spanish inside the fuselage of the aircraft. The hijackers then made a statement using the aircraft's radio saying: "Operation Condor fulfilled. Passengers, crew and equipment without incident. Position Puerto Rivero (Malvinas Islands), English authorities consider us detained. Chief of Police and Infantry taken as hostages by us until both English governor annuls arrest and recognises that we are in Argentine territory." In the afternoon, the Royal Marines installed loudspeakers and played country and western music continuously and Land Rovers were placed in front of and behind the plane.

Radio amateur Anthony Hardy reported the news and his signal was picked up in Trelew, Punta Arenas and Rio Gallegos and then was relayed to Buenos Aires. In Argentina there were a number of popular demonstrations in support of the hijackers and protests outside the residence of the British ambassador in Buenos Aires and the UK's consular office in Rosario. However, President Juan Carlos Onganía (who just three months earlier had taken power in a military coup) condemned the hijacking, saying: "The recovery of the Malvinas Islands [the Argentine name for the Falklands] can not be an excuse for factiousness." The timing was especially embarrassing as Prince Philip was visiting Argentina at the time.

== Surrender and trial in Argentina ==
On the afternoon of 29 September, the hijackers started to succumb to the cold but as they did not recognise the British or Falkland Islands authorities, they negotiated with Father Roel who granted them asylum in St Mary's Catholic Church, Stanley with the agreement from the local authorities that they would be returned to Argentina for trial. At 17:00 Father Roel escorted the hijackers off the fuselage, carrying their arms and flags and singing the Argentine National Anthem. At the church, they handed over their weapons to Captain Ernesto Fernández García of Aerolíneas Argentinas.

On 1 October, the hijackers, passengers and crew were taken to the Argentine ship ARA Bahía Buen Suceso. Cabo reportedly handed over the Argentine flags to Admiral Guzmán, saying: "Governor of our Malvinas Islands [the Argentine name for the Falklands], as you have the highest authority of our country here, I present these seven flags. One of them flew for 36 hours in these Islands and under its protection the National Anthem was sung for the first time." As the hijackers departed the Falklands, Gleadell reportedly said "Well, I think I'm going to send a telegram saying I am going to sleep" as he had spent the previous four nights in his office.

On 3 October, ARA Bahía Buen Suceso docked at the port of Ushuaia. Upon landing, Cabo stated "I went to the Malvinas to reaffirm national sovereignty and I want to clarify that at no time did I surrender to the English authorities. I accepted the lodging of the Catholic Church offered through the archbishop [sic] of the Malvinas Islands and I considered myself detained by the Argentine authority that I recognised there in the Captain of Airlines, handing over to the Governor of Tierra del Fuego and Islas Malvinas, Admiral Guzmán, the Argentine flags that flew in Malvinas soil for thirty-six hours."

On 22 November 1966, the members of the group were charged by the Federal Judge of Tierra del Fuego, Antarctica and the South Atlantic Islands, Dr Lima, for the crimes of "deprivation of liberty of qualified personnel" and "possession of weapons of war". The hijacking of aircraft was not yet a criminal offence. They were defended by the lawyers of the General Confederation of Labour and the Metal Workers' Union Fernando Torres and Jose Salomón.

They were sentenced on 26 June 1967, with most receiving lenient sentences and being released after nine months in pre-trial detention. Dardo Cabo, Alejandro Giovenco and Juan Carlos Rodríguez spent a further three years in prison because of their previous convictions.

== Aftermath ==
Ten days after the hijacking, the aircraft was flown back to Argentina and returned to service. As a result of the incident, the United Kingdom strengthened its military presence on the islands, expanding the Royal Marines detachment from six members to forty. Leslie Gleadell was praised for his handling of the hijacking and was made an Officer of the Order of the British Empire by Queen Elizabeth II at the 1967 New Year Honours. However, his involvement in the incident made him infamous in Argentina and he was pursued by the Argentine press in 1967 during a trip to Montevideo, where he had travelled for surgery. A few years later, whilst part of a trade delegation to mainland South America, a warrant was issued for his arrest in Tierra del Fuego on charges of 'deprivation of freedom, public intimidation, rebellion and theft', forcing him to return to the Falklands via Chile. Fearing for his children's safety (who were due to be educated in Argentina), in 1972 Gleadell and his family left the Falklands and emigrated to New Zealand.

In November 1968 Miguel Lawler Fitzgerald again flew to the Falklands, this time with journalist Héctor Ricardo García who had been a passenger on the Aerolíneas Argentinas Flight 648. However, they found that obstructions had been added to the racecourse to prevent aircraft from landing. As a result, Fitzgerald was forced to land on a gravel road, which damaged his twin engine Grand Commander aircraft. Fitzgerald and García were detained for 48 hours and then deported back to Argentina on HMS Endurance. Engineers from the Falkland Islands Government Air Service removed the wings from Fitzgerald's aircraft, which was sent back to Argentina on board a transport ship.

The leader of the hijackers group, Dardo Cabo, married María Cristina Verrier (the only female member of the group) whilst the former was in prison. Once freed, Cabo became the leader of the organisation Descamisados, which later merged with Montoneros, a left-wing Peronist guerrilla group. Cabo was killed by the Argentine military junta on 6 January 1977 during Argentina's last civil-military dictatorship (1976–1983) along with others in an open area of the Pereyra Iraola Park, located between the cities of La Plata and Buenos Aires.

Alejandro Giovenco became leader of the National University Concentration and was killed in Buenos Aires when a bomb exploded in his briefcase in 1974.

== Legacy ==
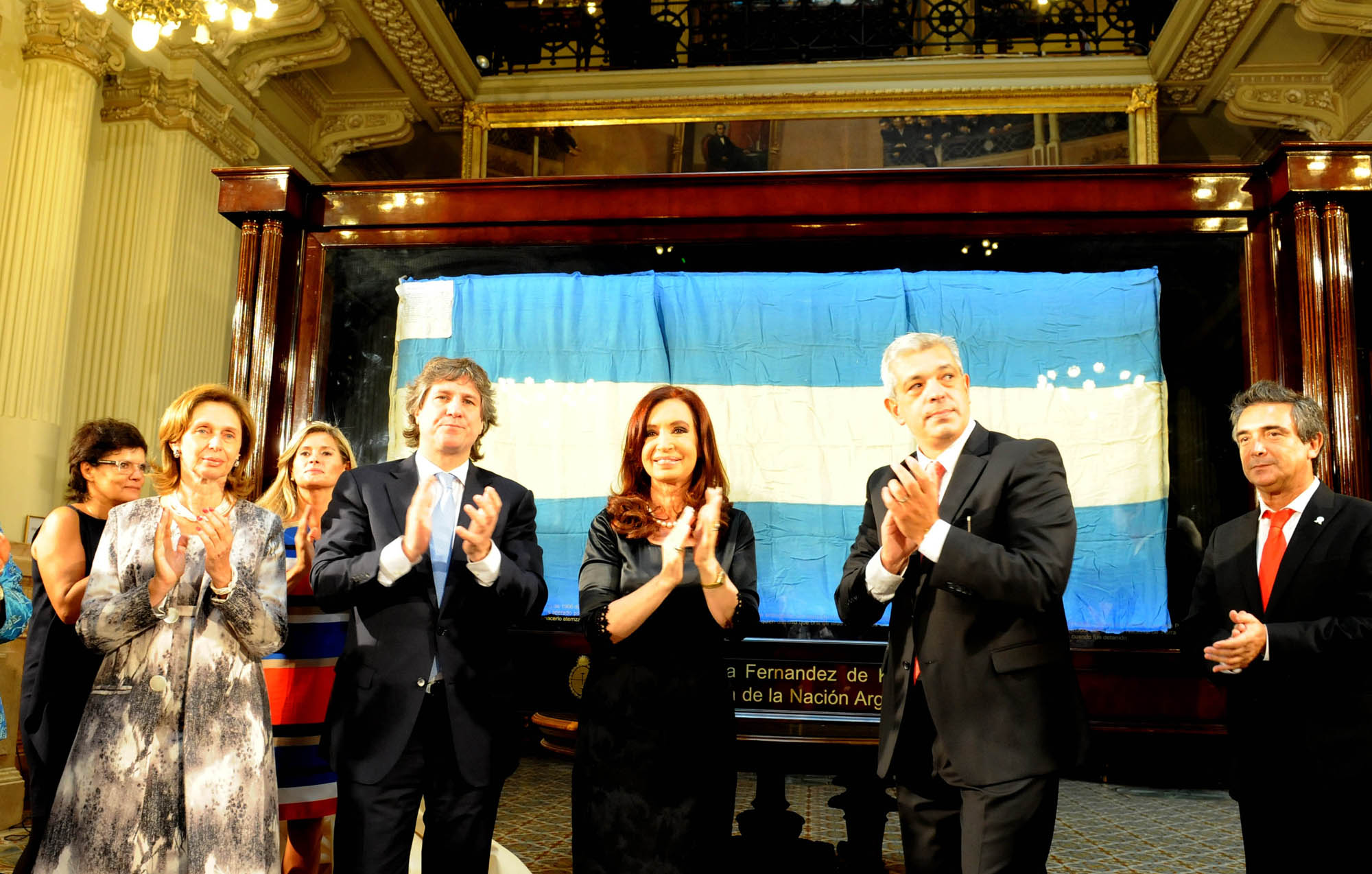
President Cristina Fernandez unveiling one of the Argentine flags taken to the islands in the Palace of the Argentine National Congress

In 2006, on the 40th anniversary of the hijacking, a special tribute session was held in the Senate of the Province of Buenos Aires where diplomas and medals were awarded to the attending hijackers and relatives of the deceased. Also in 2006, a declaration of homage was approved in the Argentine Chamber of Deputies for the hijackers. In 2009 the government of the Argentine province of Buenos Aires granted "monthly social pensions", the equivalent to the basic salary of provincial government staff, to the hijackers and their families.

In 2013 President Cristina Fernández unveiled one of the Argentine flags flown on the islands during the incident in the Hall of the Lost Steps in the Palace of the Argentine National Congress. Two more flags are on display, one in the Casa Rosada, in the Basilica of Our Lady of Luján and the other in the Malvinas Museum in Buenos Aires. There is also a monument to the hijackers at the Plaza San Martín in Ituzaingó Partido.

The Argentine government's celebration of the hijacking has been criticised in the Falkland Islands, with former member of the Legislative Assembly, Gavin Short, describing the perpetrators as "hijackers and terrorists".
