= St. Joseph Church, Edinburgh of the Seven Seas =

Catholic church in Tristan da Cunha

Coordinates: 37.06715°S 12.3116°W

St. Joseph Church
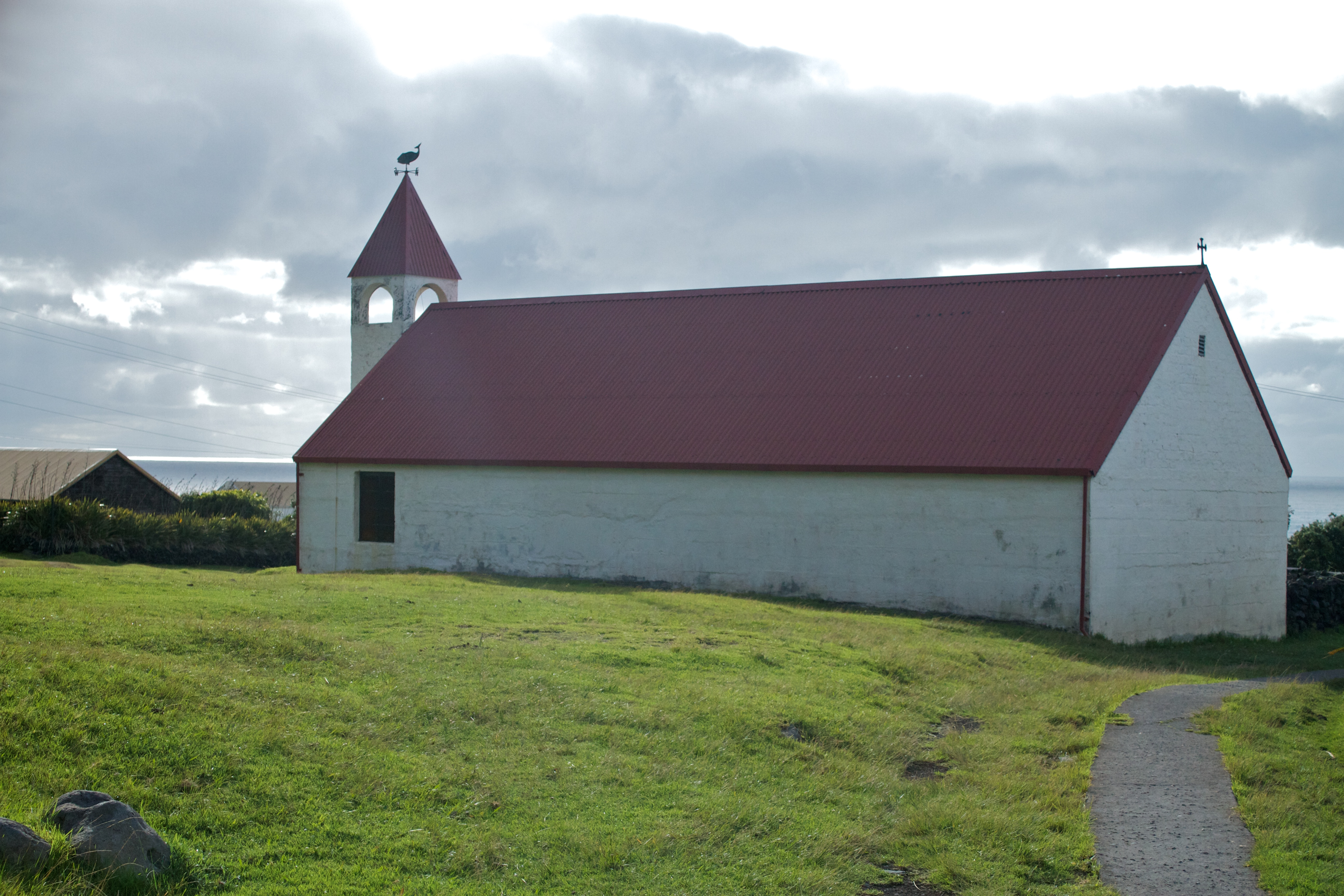
- St. Joseph's Church in 2012
- St. Joseph Church
- Location: Edinburgh of the Seven Seas
- Country: Saint Helena, Ascension and Tristan da Cunha; United Kingdom
- Denomination: Catholic Church
- Sui iuris church: Latin Church

St. Joseph Church is a Catholic church in the town of Edinburgh of the Seven Seas on the island of Tristan da Cunha. It is the most isolated Roman Catholic Parish in the world. Originally the site of chapel, it was replaced by the church in the 1990s. The church has an elongated nave, a red roof, and a stained glass depiction of Our Lady, Star of the Sea.

The church is part of the Mission sui iuris of Saint Helena, Ascension and Tristan da Cunha and is vested by the Apostolic Prefecture of the Falkland Islands. The church itself has no resident priests and relies on three lay ministers to hold services in the church. They use communion bread consecrated during Ecclesiastical Superiors' visits on the island while the Superior is not present.

== History ==
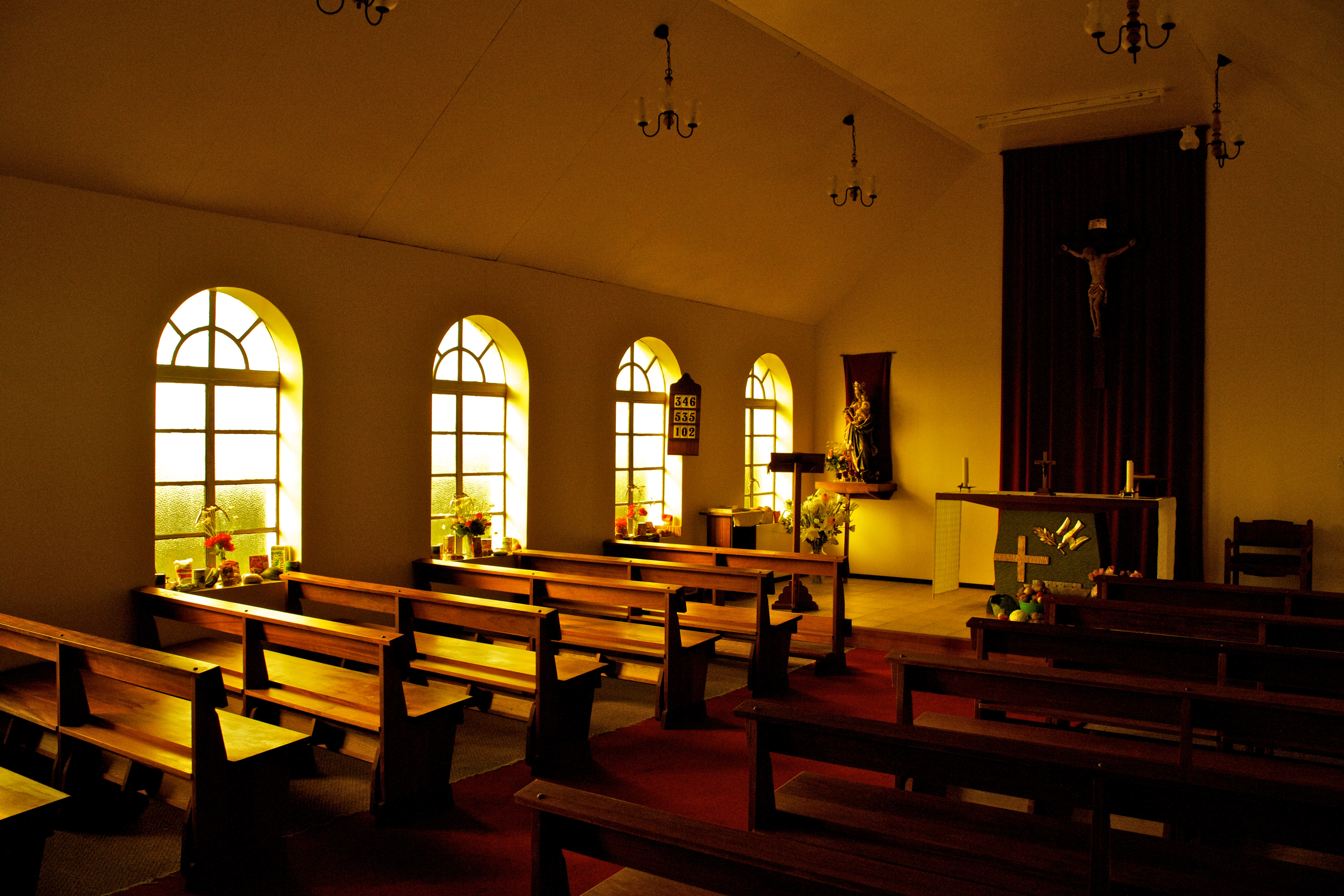
Interior of the church.

The first Catholics on the island were the Italian settlers Andrea Repetto and Gaetano Lavarello in 1892 though later joined Tristan da Cunha's Anglican congregation. Sisters Elizabeth, Annie, and Agnes Smith were the next Catholics to arrive on the island, having done so in 1908, coming in from Ireland. They later settled on the island alongside their husbands and Elizabeth and Agnes established the island's Catholic community.

The first Catholic priest to visit the island was in 1932, with Agnes being inspired to set up an altar in her home in 1934 and started holding services. She was awarded a Benemerenti medal by Pope Pius XII in 1958 due to her services for the faith. A small chapel was then built in Edinburgh of the Seven Seas in 1983. As the territory is part of the jurisdiction of the Mission sui juris of Saint Helena, Ascension and Tristan da Cunha (Missio sui iuris Sanctae Helenae, Ascensionis et Tristanensis), it is vested by the Apostolic Prefecture of the Falkland Islands, with Tristan da Cunha's first Ecclesiastical Superior being Monsignor Anton Agreiter from 1986 to 2003.

In the 1990s, the chapel was replaced by St. Joseph Church, the most isolated Roman Catholic Parish. The church features an elongated nave and a red roof, with its indoor setting having a stained glass depiction of Our Lady, Star of the Sea. As of June 2024, the church has no permanent resident priests. Lay ministers Derek Rogers, Anne Green, and James Glass, hold the services of the church. To hold communion at the church at an absence of a priest, around 4000 pieces of sacramental bread are consecrated and vacuum sealed during Ecclesiastical Superiors' visits to be used in services while the Superior is gone.

== See also ==
- Roman Catholicism in Tristan da Cunha
- St. Joseph Church
