= Sacred Heart Church, Jamestown =

Coordinates: 15.933053°S 5.712114°W

Sacred Heart Church
- Sacred Heart Church
- Location: Jamestown
- Country: Saint Helena, Ascension and Tristan da Cunha; United Kingdom
- Denomination: Catholic Church

History
- Founded: 1852
- Dedication: Sacred Heart

Administration
- Diocese: The Apostolic Prefecture of the Falkland Islands and Mission sui iuris of St. Helena, Ascension Island and Tristan da Cunha
- Parish: Sacred Heart

Clergy
- Priest(s): Fr David Musgrave, ISch

The Sacred Heart Church is a religious building that is affiliated with the Catholic Church and is located in the town of Jamestown on the island of Saint Helena, part of the British overseas territory of Saint Helena, Ascension and Tristan da Cunha in the southern Atlantic Ocean.

This is one of 3 operating Catholic churches in that territory, the others being those located in Cat Hill, near Wideawake Airfield in Ascension Island (Church of Our Lady of the Ascension), and in Edinburgh of the Seven Seas on the island of Tristan da Cunha (St. Joseph Church).

The first Catholic priests came to Saint Helena with Napoleon Bonaparte in 1819. Father Antonio Bounavita and Father Ange Vignali arrived on St. Helena. Bounavita left the island in March 1821, leaving Vignali to administer Extreme Unction to Napoleon on 5 May 1821 and conduct his burial service on 9 May. There were only sporadic visits from priests for the next thirty years. A permanent church was built in 1852, and the first resident priest arrived under the jurisdiction of Apostolic Vicariate of Cape of Good Hope, Western District. The congregation is part of the constituency of the Mission sui juris of Saint Helena, Ascension and Tristan da Cunha (Missio sui iuris Sanctae Helenae, Ascensionis et Tristanensis), which was created in 1986 under the pontificate of Pope John Paul II.

== See also ==
- Roman Catholicism in Saint Helena
- Sacred Heart Church (disambiguation)
