= Hugh Allan (abbot) =

English Roman Catholic priest (born 1976)

The Right Reverend Abbot Hugh Allan O.Praem.
- Apostolic Administrator Emeritus of the Prefecture of the Falkland Islands and Ecclesiastical Superior of the Mission sui iuris of the islands of Ascension, St Helena and Tristan da Cunha and Titular Abbot of Beeleigh Abbey
- Church: Roman Catholic Church
- Province: Immediately subject to the Holy See
- Diocese: Falkland Islands, Saint Helena, Ascension Island and Tristan da Cunha
- Appointed: 26 October 2016
- Installed: 8 December 2016
- Term ended: 18 July 2024
- Predecessor: Michael McPartland, S.M.A.
- Successor: Tom Thomas IC
- Other posts: Prior of the Priory of Our Lady of Sorrows, Peckham, United Kingdom

Orders
- Ordination: 22 November 2002 by Terence Brain
- Rank: Titular Abbot

Personal details
- Born: David Renwick Turnbull Allan; 3 August 1976 (age 50) Hatfield, Hertfordshire, England
- Denomination: Roman Catholic
- Education: St Mary's University, Twickenham; St Benet's Hall, Oxford
- Motto: finis fidei salus animarum (The End of Faith is the Salvation of Souls)
- Coat of arms

Hugh David Renwich Turnbull Allan, O.Praem. (born 3 August 1976) is a Premonstratensian canon regular and Roman Catholic priest who was the Apostolic Administrator of the Prefecture of the Falkland Islands and Ecclesiastical Superior of the Mission sui iuris of the islands of Ascension, St Helena and Tristan da Cunha from 2016 - 2024.

== Biography ==
Hugh Allan was born in Hertfordshire, England, to a Scottish family from the town of Auchtermuchty, located close to the village of Falkland. Raised as a Free Presbyterian, Allan converted to Catholicism at the age of 16. He trained to be a teacher at St Mary's University, Twickenham. On leaving university, he joined the Order of Canons Regular of Prémontré, also known as the Premonstratensians, the Norbertines or ‘White Canons'. Following his novitiate, he was sent to complete further studies at St Benet's Hall, Oxford. He made his solemn profession on 27 October 2001 and was ordained a priest on 22 November 2002 by Bishop Terence Brain.

Following ordination, he worked as a full-time school chaplain in North Manchester. In 2004, he was appointed parish priest of Gorton, Manchester. In 2006, he was appointed superior of the Norbertine community in Manchester, aged only 29. At the time, he was the youngest Catholic religious superior in the world. In 2008, the Norbertines opened a new Priory in Chelmsford and he was appointed superior to this new canonry. At the same time, he was appointed parish priest of Chelmsford and has also recently served as the Area Dean for Mid-Essex.

He was appointed Apostolic Administrator of the Falkland Islands and Ecclesiastic Superior of St. Helena, Ascension Island and Tristan da Cunha by Fernando Cardinal Filoni on 26 October 2016 for a period of five years. In recognition of this ecclesiastical appointment, Allan was also elevated to the title of Titular Abbot of Beeleigh by the Abbot General of the Norbertine Order, Thomas Handgrätinger, and by permission and agreement of the owners of Beeleigh Abbey Mr and Mrs Christopher Foyle, in which capacity he was officially installed on 8 December 2016.

On 18 July 2024, three years after his mandate was due to end, Fr Tom Thomas was appointed as Allan's successor as Prefect.
