= St. Mary's Church, Falkland Islands =

Coordinates: 51.6917°S 57.8644°W

St. Mary's Church
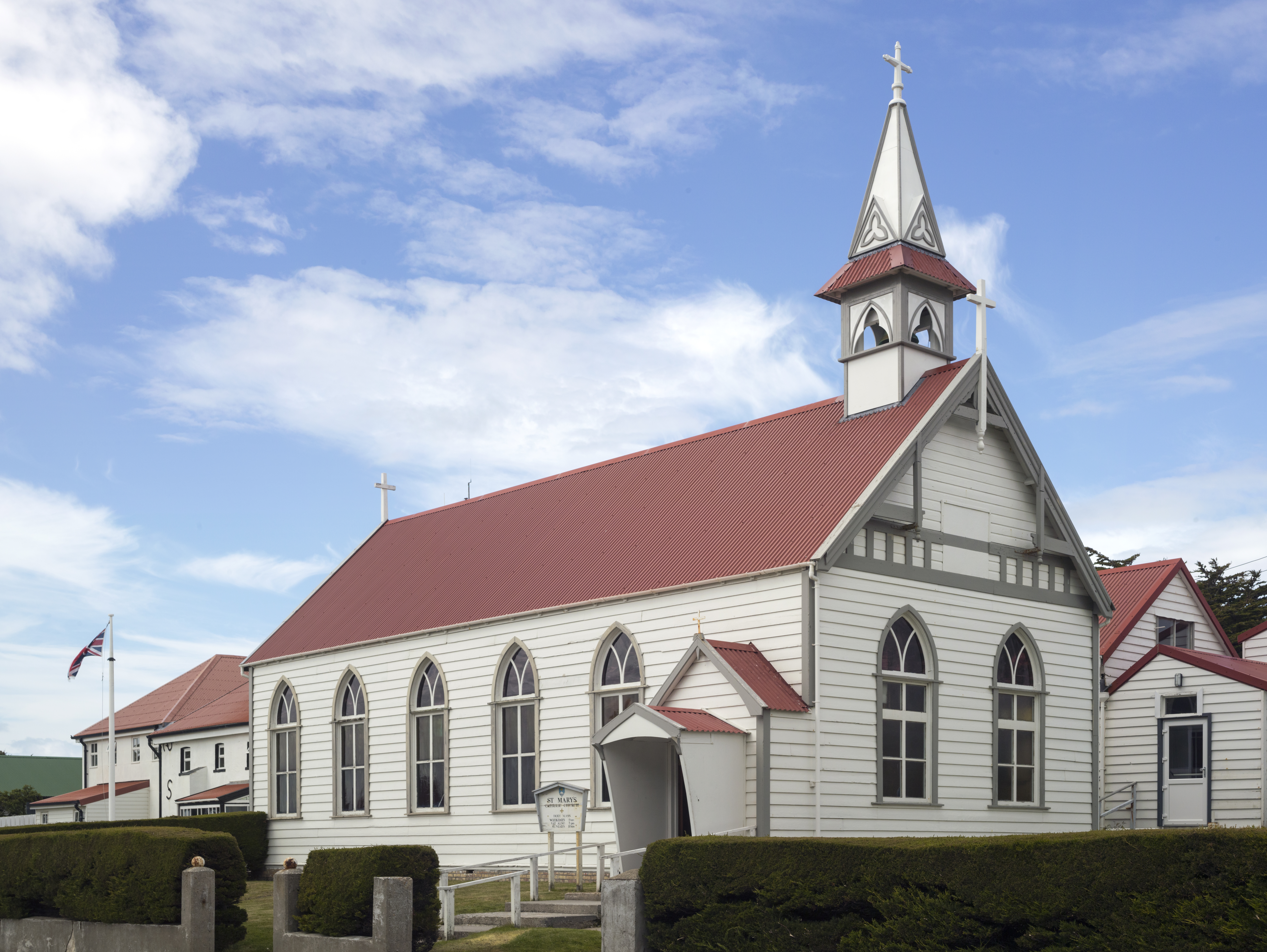
- St. Mary's Church, 2016
- St. Mary's Church
- Address: 12 Ross Road, Stanley
- Country: Falkland Islands
- Denomination: Roman Catholic

History
- Status: Church
- Dedication: Mary, Star of the Sea
- Consecrated: 1899

Specifications
- Materials: Timber

Administration
- Parish: Apostolic Prefecture of the Falkland Islands

St. Mary's Church is a Roman Catholic church located at 12 Ross Road, Stanley, Falkland Islands. It is the only Catholic church in the Falklands. It was constructed in 1899 and continued to operate throughout the Falklands War.

== Construction ==
The church is the only parish of the Apostolic Prefecture of the Falkland Islands, an isolated territorial jurisdiction of the Catholic Church directly dependent on the Holy See. It is the only Catholic church in the islands. The church is made of wood. On the West wall it has oil murals, illustrated by British artist James Peck, who was born in the islands.

== History ==
Catholics in the Falkland Islands originally worshipped in a hall constructed in 1866. The current church was constructed and consecrated in 1899 with the old hall becoming the church hall. Originally it was under the pastoral jurisdiction of French and later Spanish missionaries but ministered to by Irish priests. In 2002, this pastoral responsibility passed to the Catholic Bishops Conference of England and Wales. The parish consists of a third of the globe to Saint Helena and is mostly water.

In September 1966, the hijackers of Aerolíneas Argentinas Flight 648 were granted sanctuary in the church by Father Rodolfo Roel (of Dutch origin) whilst they awaited deportation back to Argentina for trial.

During the Falklands War in 1982, the parish priest Michael McPartland negotiated with the Argentine troops to continue holding Mass in English. After the war, an Argentine statue of Our Lady of Luján from the Argentine Military Chapel was displayed in St. Mary's Church before being taken to the United Kingdom. In 2019, it was returned to Argentina under the blessing of Pope Francis.

== See also ==
- Catholic Church in the Falkland Islands
