= Agreiter =

Agreiter is a germanised version of the Ladin surname Aiarëi. Notable people with the surname include:

- Debora Agreiter (born 1991), Italian cross-country skier
- Anton Agreiter (1934–2003), Roman Catholic priest
