= Fundación Cultural Patagonia String Quartet =

Patagonian musical group

FCP Quartet
- Origin: General Roca, Rio Negro, Patagonia
- Genre: Contemporary classical
- Occupation: Chamber ensemble
- Years active: 1998-present
- Label: Energia Sonora Records
- Members: Elvira Faseeva; Vitali Vitalishvili; Gela Gelashvili; Juan Costanza

The Fundación Cultural Patagonia String Quartet (FCP String Quartet) is a musical group from Patagonia.

Three of its members are natives of the nation of Georgia, in the Caucasus. The group plays classical music, contemporary, tango, folklore and Georgian music.

== History ==
The Quartet was founded in 1998 under the guidance of Ljerko Spiller at a time when the former republics of the USSR were faced with major economic and political problems.

Elvira Faseeva Tbilisi, Vitali Bujiashvili and Gela Gelashvil from Mtskheta (old capital of Georgia), in search of a living for his family, accepted an invitation to travel to Argentina and a contract for a year to assemble a string quartet at the Arts University of General Roca city (Rio Negro province, Patagonia). Later, Juan Bautista Constanza of Santa Fe became the fourth member of the quartet.

The Quartet´s first concert took place on September 12 at “Ciudad de las Artes” Auditorium, General Roca, Río Negro.

== Other activities ==
Members of the group regularly teach regularly at IUPA (Instituto Universitario Patagonico de Artes) in Gral. Roca, Rio Negro, Argentina.

From 2008 to 2013 they collaborated with painter Georg and musician Xunorus in Cantata Romanos VIII, a CD with instrumental music from Patagonia.

== Members ==
- Elvira Faseeva (violin) 1998-
- Vitali Vilishvili (violin) 1998-
- Gela Gelashvili (viola) 1998-
- Juan Costanza (cello) 1999-
