= Michael McPartland =

Michael Bernard McPartland S.M.A.
- Prefect Apostolic of the Falkland Islands and Ecclesiastic Superior of St. Helena, Ascension Island and Tristan da Cunha
- Church: St Mary's Catholic Church, Stanley
- Province: Immediately subject to the Holy See
- Diocese: Falkland Islands, Saint Helena, Ascension Island and Tristan da Cunha
- Installed: 9 August 2002
- Term ended: 26 October 2016
- Predecessor: Anton Agreiter
- Successor: Hugh Allan

Orders
- Ordination: 14 May 1978
- Rank: Monsignor

Personal details
- Born: 29 September 1939 Middlesbrough, England
- Died: 6 April 2017 (aged 77)
- Denomination: Roman Catholic

Monsignor Michael Bernard McPartland, S.M.A. (29 September 1939 – 6 April 2017) was a Roman Catholic priest who served as the Apostolic Prefect of the Falkland Islands and Ecclesiastic Superior of St. Helena, Ascension Island and Tristan da Cunha since 2002 until 2016.

At the age of 15, McPartland left school and worked for five years as a salesman before joining the British Army in 1960, serving for eleven years after which he worked for British Rail. In 1973 he began formal studies for the priesthood with the Society of African Missions and was ordained on 14 May 1978. McPartland's first appointment was in the north of Nigeria where he served until 1982 when he returned to the United Kingdom. In 1998 he was sent to Nairobi, Kenya before he was appointed Apostolic Prefect of the Falkland Islands and Ecclesiastic Superior of St. Helena, Ascension Island and Tristan da Cunha by Pope John Paul II in August 2002.

In 2013, following the election as Pope of Jorge Mario Bergoglio from Argentina (which claims the Falklands to be part of its territory), McPartland stated that "[Bergoglio] must be seen as Pope first and where he comes from should not figure in the equation. But I would also like to think he would have a beneficial impact and perhaps be able to express some soothing words that would help the situation here."
