= Catholic Church in the Falkland Islands =

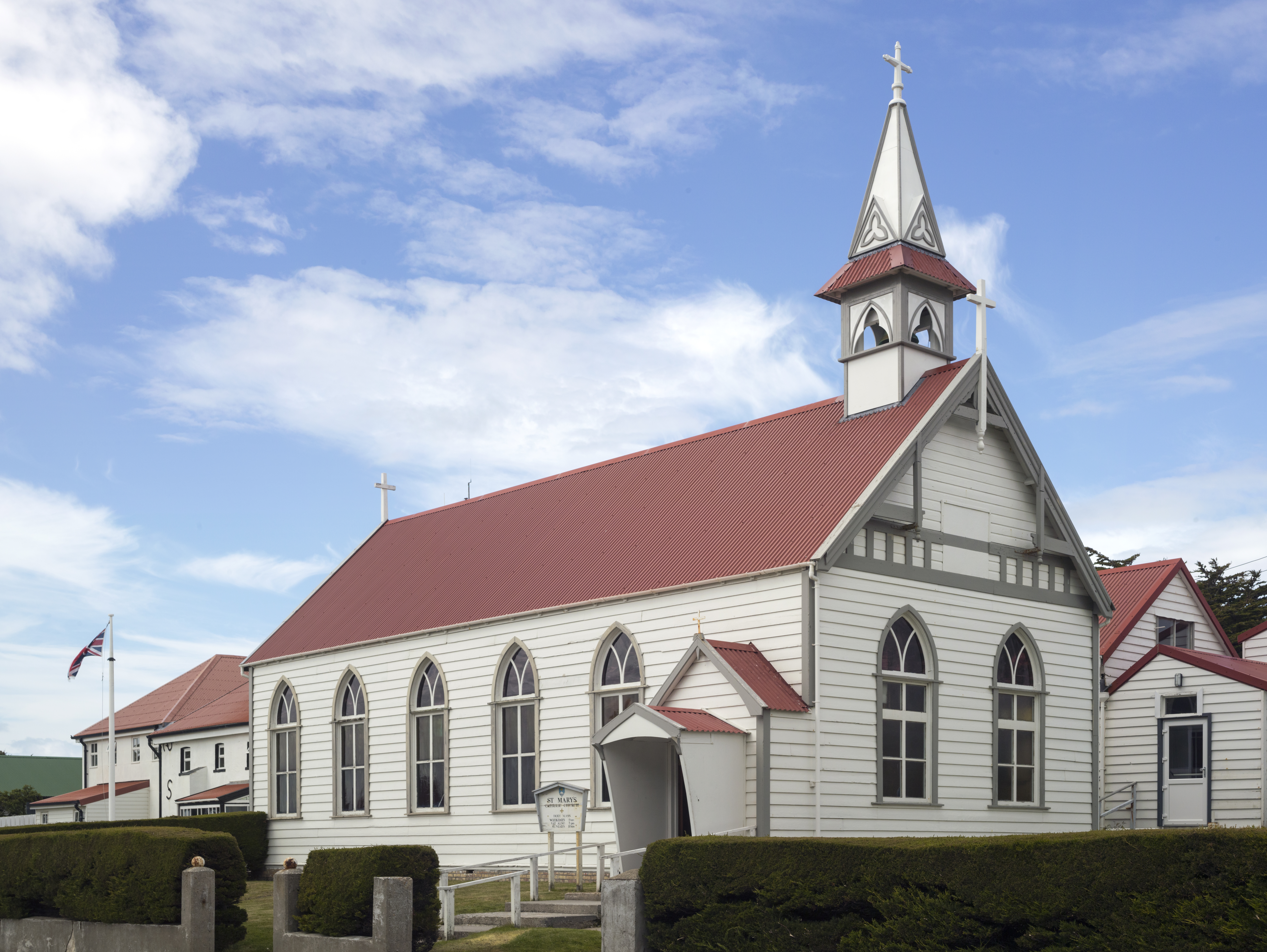
St. Mary's Catholic Church

There are over 230 Catholics in the Falkland Islands, approximately 10% of the total population. There are no dioceses in the islands, instead they form an apostolic prefecture which was erected in January 1952. It is immediately subject to the Holy See and separate from any Argentine or UK dioceses. The Apostolic Administrator of the prefecture is Father Tom Thomas IC, who was appointed in 2024. Father Ambrose Bennett, OSB, is the parish priest of the Islands.

The Eucharist is celebrated at RAF Mount Pleasant.

== History ==
When the French settled the islands in 1764 at Saint Louis, A Benedictine, Antoine-Joseph Pernety, served as priest and set up a simple chapel. Under Spanish control 1767–1810 the catholic presence increased. Under British rule from 1833, the catholic presence initially lacked an official clergy. Appeals led to visiting catholic priests from Ireland, and early church-building attempts which struggled financially, but St Mary’s Church was established (1873) and rebuilt in 1886. In 1952 the islands became an Apostolic Prefecture; leadership passed to Mill Hill Missionaries with successive prefects overseeing the Church.

== St. Mary's Catholic Church ==
St. Mary's Catholic Church in Ross Road in Stanley is the sole Catholic Church on the Falkland Islands. Construction of the church finished and it was blessed in 1899. It is an example of a Victorian kit building. Prior to the construction of the church, catholic sunday services were held by Thomas Havers in a house in Stanley. In the early 1990s, the altar rails and the statue of the Sacred Heart were removed and Monsignor Anton Agreiter installed a new altar featuring a carving of the Good Shepherd, along with a new crucifix and a statue of the Blessed Virgin Mary, both sourced from his native South Tyrol. On the west wall is a "pictorial history" of the Catholic Church in the Falkland Islands; it was illustrated by the local artist James Peck.

== Religious affiliation ==
Christianity	Unknown	Non-Religious
67.2%	1.3%	31.5%
