= Georg Miciú =

Argentine artist

Georg
- Georg Miciú Nicolaevici
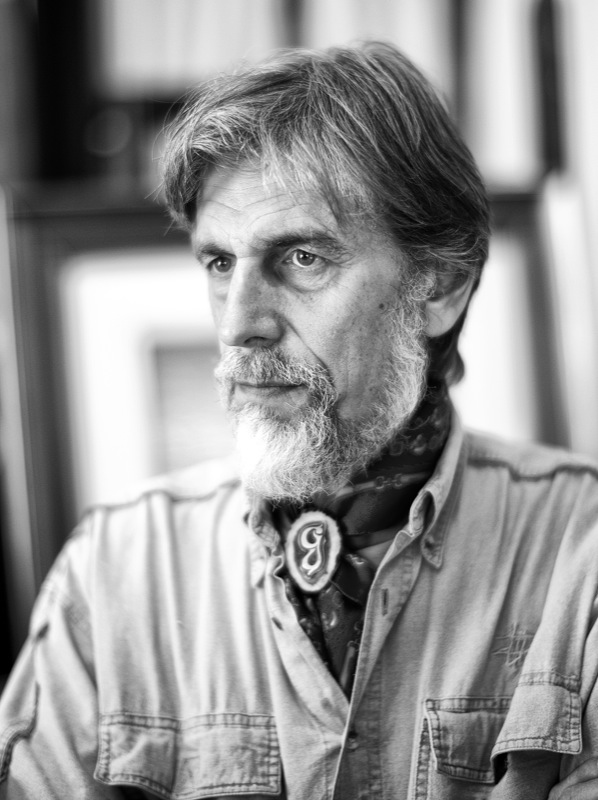
- Georg (2009)
- Born: May 8, 1946 (age 80)
- Known for: Painter
- Website: georg.com.ar

Georg (born May 4, 1946) is an Argentine artist and a Patagonic representational painter of urban and country scenes from his homes in Patagonia; Córdoba, Argentina; and Spain.

He studied under his father Konstantino with his brother Demetrio Miciu, and is well known as a patriarch and muse to several Patagonic artists.

Georg is at the center of a milieu of important Patagonic painters, poets, and musicians including painters Iván Moricz Karl, Emiliano Céliz, Xunorus, the Fundación Cultural Patagonia String Quartet (FCP String Quartet), and Emaús.

In 1995, Grinfeld Fine Arts opened the "Sala de Georg" in Palm Beach, Florida, United States.

== Biography ==
Austrian by birth and Patagonian by adoption, he was brought to Argentina – at age three – by his parents who had felt at close range the ravages of war in Europe. He spent his childhood among the Dunes of Gesell, instilling in him a love of nature. Many years and relocations later, he lived for a time in the region of City Bell, near Pereyra Iraola Park, where he explored the park's fascinating light and made numerous watercolor paintings.

His mother cultivated his taste for music, which led him to study at Gilardo Gilardi Conservatory of Music in La Plata, where maestro Adalberto Tortorella developed into him a well-rounded sense of what constitutes art.

Under the guidance of his father, he traveled and painted in the south of Argentina. On many other trips, he studied the great masters of art at museums and collections in South America, the United States, Canada, Mexico, the Middle East, and in Europe. Simultaneously, he perfected the technique of painting en plein air and adopted the palette knife as his primary painting tool. Georg opened solo shows in Jerusalem, Paris, Stuttgart, Barcelona, and Granada, showing works of Patagonia.

Married and with their first small children already born, Miciú took his family to live in Spain for four years where they exhibited works in various cities, sharing with people a reflection of Patagonia. Of special note during their stay were the paintings he made of pasturelands, animal herds, and the hidden corners of Andalucia, which today have disappeared from Granada.

Returning to Argentina, they settled in the Sierras de Córdoba.

In 1990, Miciú worked with his friend and collaborator Jorge Bonzano to open "Sala de Georg" in Villa Giardino. They then moved to San Martín de los Andes.

His work has since rotated around exhibitions in Rosario, Córdoba, Buenos Aires, Bariloche, Mar del Plata, and abroad in Granada, Almeria, and in San Francisco and Montecito in California – over 300 individual exhibitions.

In 1993, the exposition "Three Generations Miciu" opened in Villa Allenda, Córdoba, where his work was accompanied by works of his father, brother, and son Emaús. A variation on this exhibit later appeared in Buenos Aires at the National Museum of Decorative Art. That same year, he painted Truchas y lupinos (Trout and Lupines), an oil painting that marked a shift towards a different style.

Two years later, Grinfeld Fine Arts opened a "Sala de Georg" in Palm Beach. Grinfeld also printed limited-edition prints and lithographs, for wider distribution of his work.

In 2005, Grinfeld published Georg, a synthesis of his trajectory. A year later, Jorge Bonzano co-worked again to start the construction of the building that is, in a sense, the aim of his catalog.
