= Anton Agreiter =

Catholic priest

Anton Agreiter MHM
- Prefect Apostolic of the Falkland Islands and Ecclesiastic Superior of St. Helena, Ascension Island and Tristan da Cunha
- Church: St Mary's Catholic Church, Stanley
- Province: Immediately subject to the Holy See
- Diocese: Falkland Islands, Saint Helena, Ascension Island and Tristan da Cunha
- Installed: 1 October 1986
- Term ended: 9 August 2002
- Predecessor: Daniel Martin Spraggon
- Successor: Michael Bernard McPartland

Orders
- Ordination: 13 July 1958
- Rank: Monsignor

Personal details
- Born: 18 March 1934 St. Leonhard, Brixen, Italy
- Died: 15 October 2003 (aged 69)
- Denomination: Roman Catholic

Monsignor Anton Agreiter, MHM (18 March 1934 − 15 October 2003) was a Catholic priest who served as the Apostolic Prefect of the Falkland Islands and Ecclesiastic Superior of St. Helena, Ascension Island and Tristan da Cunha since 1986 to 2002.

He was the third apostolic priest of the Falklands, he oversaw renovations of St. Mary's Church, and wrote historical surveys of the catholic church on the archipelago.

== Life and career ==
Agreiter was born in St. Leonhard near Brixen in Italian's autonomous province of South Tyrol in a German-speaking peasants family as the youngest, fifteenth son. In the young age he joined a society of apostolic life of Mill Hill Missionaries and was ordained as priest on 13 July 1953. In the beginning he was sent to Uganda before he was appointed Apostolic Prefect of the Falkland Islands and Ecclesiastic Superior of St. Helena, Ascension Island and Tristan da Cunha by Pope John Paul II on 1 October 1986, succeeding monsignor Daniel Spraggon, becoming the third prefect apostolic of the Falkland islands. He oversaw the renovation of St. Mary's Church in the early 1990s, the altar rails and the statue of the Sacred Heart were removed. Monsignor Agreiter installed a new altar featuring a carving of the Good Shepherd, along with a new crucifix and a statue of the Blessed Virgin Mary, both sourced from his native South Tyrol. The pews, pulpit, and tabernacle were also replaced. He retired in 2002, succeeded by Michael Bernard McPartland, and died in 2003 at the age of 69.
