= Mission sui iuris of Saint Helena, Ascension and Tristan da Cunha =

Catholic missionary jurisdiction in the Southern Atlantic Ocean

Mission sui iuris of Saint Helena, Ascension and Tristan da Cunha Missio sui iuris Sanctae Helenae, Ascensionis et Tristanensis

Location
- Country: Saint Helena, Ascension and Tristan da Cunha
- Territory: Saint Helena; Ascension Island; Tristan da Cunha
- Ecclesiastical province: Immediately subject to the Holy See

Statistics
- Area: 308 km^{2} (119 sq mi)
- Population: Total; Catholics: (as of 2017); 5,500; 200 (3.6%)
- Parishes: 3

Information
- Denomination: Catholic Church
- Sui iuris church: Latin Church
- Rite: Roman Rite
- Established: 18 August 1986
- Secular priests: 2

Current leadership
- Pope: Leo XIV
- Superior: Fr Tom Thomas Pattasseril IC

The Mission sui iuris of Saint Helena, Ascension and Tristan da Cunha (Latin: Missio sui iuris Sanctae Helenae, Ascensionis et Tristanensis) is part of the worldwide Catholic Church, under the spiritual leadership of the Pope in Rome. The Mission sui iuris is located in Saint Helena, Ascension and Tristan da Cunha and covering the Islands Saint Helena, Ascension and Tristan da Cunha.

== Churches ==
There are three churches on the islands pertaining to the Catholic mission:

- the Sacred Heart Church in Jamestown on Saint Helena island;
- the St. Joseph Church in Edinburgh of the Seven Seas on Tristan da Cunha island;
- the Church of Our Lady of the Ascension in Cat Hill, on Ascension Island, near the RAF Airfield.

== History ==
On August 18, 1986 the Mission sui iuris of Saint Helena, Ascension and Tristan da Cunha was established from the Archdiocese of Cape Town in South Africa. From the start, the office of its ecclesiastical superior (also exempt, i.e. immediately subject to the Holy See) has been vested in the Apostolic Prefecture of the Falkland Islands, another UK Southern Atlantic overseas possession.

== Leadership ==
- Prelates of Saint Helena, Ascension and Tristan da Cunha (Roman Rite)
  - Mgr. Anton Agreiter, M.H.M. (October 1, 1986 – August 9, 2002)
  - Mgr. Michael Bernard McPartland, S.M.A. (August 9, 2002 – 26 October 2016)
  - Abbot Hugh David Renwich Turnbull Allan, o.praem (26 October 2016 - 18 July 2024)
  - Fr Tom Thomas Pattasseril IC (18 July 2024 - present)
