= Claudio Maldonado (musician) =

Argentine composer, guitarist and arranger

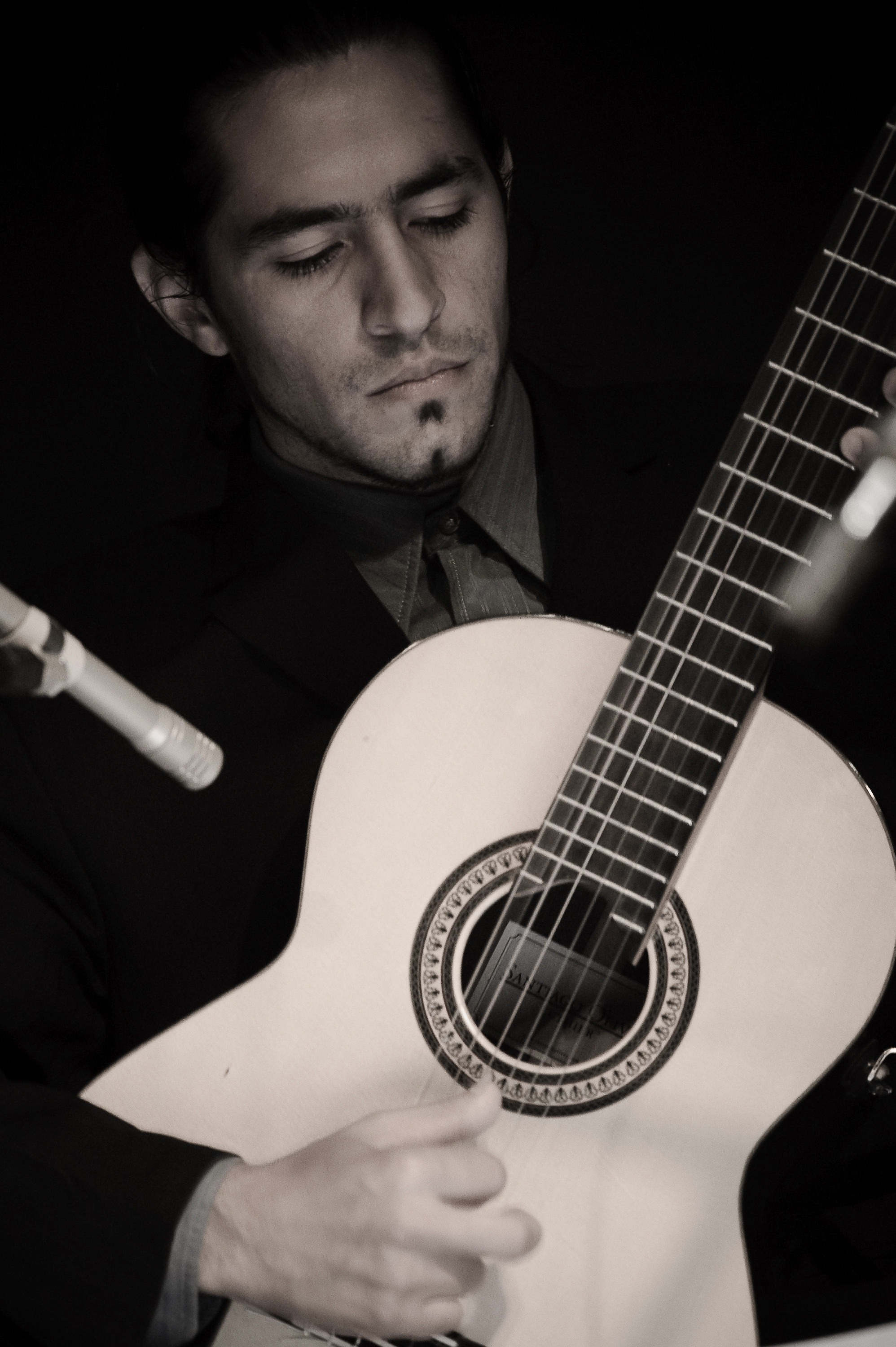
- Claudio Maldonado in concert (2009)

Background information
- Also known as: Xunorus
- Born: Claudio Hernán Maldonado; April 18, 1980 (age 46); Lanús, Buenos Aires
- Genres: Contemporary classical music, Electronic
- Occupations: composer-performer, musician, electroacoustic music, software developer
- Instruments: Classical Guitar, Electronics
- Website: http://xunorus.com

Claudio Maldonado, also known as Xunorus (born in 1980), is an Argentine composer, guitarist and arranger, referent musician from the new generation of classical music contemporary composers from Patagonia .

== Career ==
He is the author of Suite Patagonica, AH!, Colección ( based on Georg 's paintings), Cantata Instrumental and Tierra del Viento ( based on Eliseo Miciú 's homonymous book) among others. Since 2003, he has been the artistic director of Energia Sonora.

Xunorus has been distinguished among the Top Ten World Composer Performers (Transatlantic Arts Consortium USA-Europe), National Fund for the Arts (FNArtes 2017), Young Creators Award (Department of Culture of the Argentine Nation), La Falda International Guitar Festival 2013, Cotija de la Paz Culture department (2005 Michoacán -Mexico), among others.

He has appeared in both facets as a composer and performer in prestigious venues such as: REDCAT Walt Disney Concert Hall 2009 (LA-USA), Lake Theater (Frutillar-Chile 2012), Bariloche Musical Camping (Rio Negro), Colorado Springs Guitar Society (USA), International Guitar Academy Berlin 8th Festival (Germany), International Multimedia Festival (UNLa), 404 International Festival of Electronic Art (Ros. -Arg.), XVIII Electroacustic National Music Meeting (FARME), Vsiones Sonoras 2005 (Mexico City), Manzana de las Luces (Bs As-Arg.), Principe de Asturias Theater (Rosario-Arg.), Fortabat Museum and Llao Llao Resorts performing among America and Europe.

In 2009 he premiered the collaborative opera AH!. among with CofT Ensemble, conducted by David Rosenboom with staging by director Travis Preston, scenic design by Christopher Barreca, video design by Jeremiah Thies, choreography by Mira Kingsley, lighting design By Laura Mroczkowdki, and a host of other contributing artists. These performances sold out audiences at REDCAT in Los Angeles, US.
