= Apostolic Prefecture of the Falkland Islands =

Catholic missionary jurisdiction in the Southern Atlantic Ocean

Apostolic Prefecture of Falkland Islands Apostolica Praefectura de Insulis Falkland

Location
- Territory: Falkland Islands; South Georgia and South Sandwich Islands
- Ecclesiastical province: Immediately exempt to the Holy See

Statistics
- Area: 12,173 km^{2} (4,700 sq mi)
- Population: Total; Catholics: (as of 2022); 2,530; 400 (15.8%)
- Parishes: 1

Information
- Denomination: Catholic Church
- Sui iuris church: Latin Church
- Rite: Roman Rite
- Established: 10 January 1952
- Patron saint: Our Lady, Star of the Sea

Current leadership
- Pope: Leo XIV
- Apostolic Administrator: Tom Thomas, IC

Map

Website
- prefecturemission.org

The Apostolic Prefecture of Falkland Islands (Latin: Apostolica Præfectura de Insulis Falkland) is a Latin Church missionary ecclesiastical jurisdiction or apostolic prefecture of the Catholic Church covering the Falkland Islands and South Georgia and the South Sandwich Islands, UK Southern Atlantic Ocean overseas possessions.

It is immediately exempt to the Holy See and not part of an ecclesiastical province. Currently its only church in the Falklands is St. Mary's Church, in the Falklands capital Stanley.

== History ==
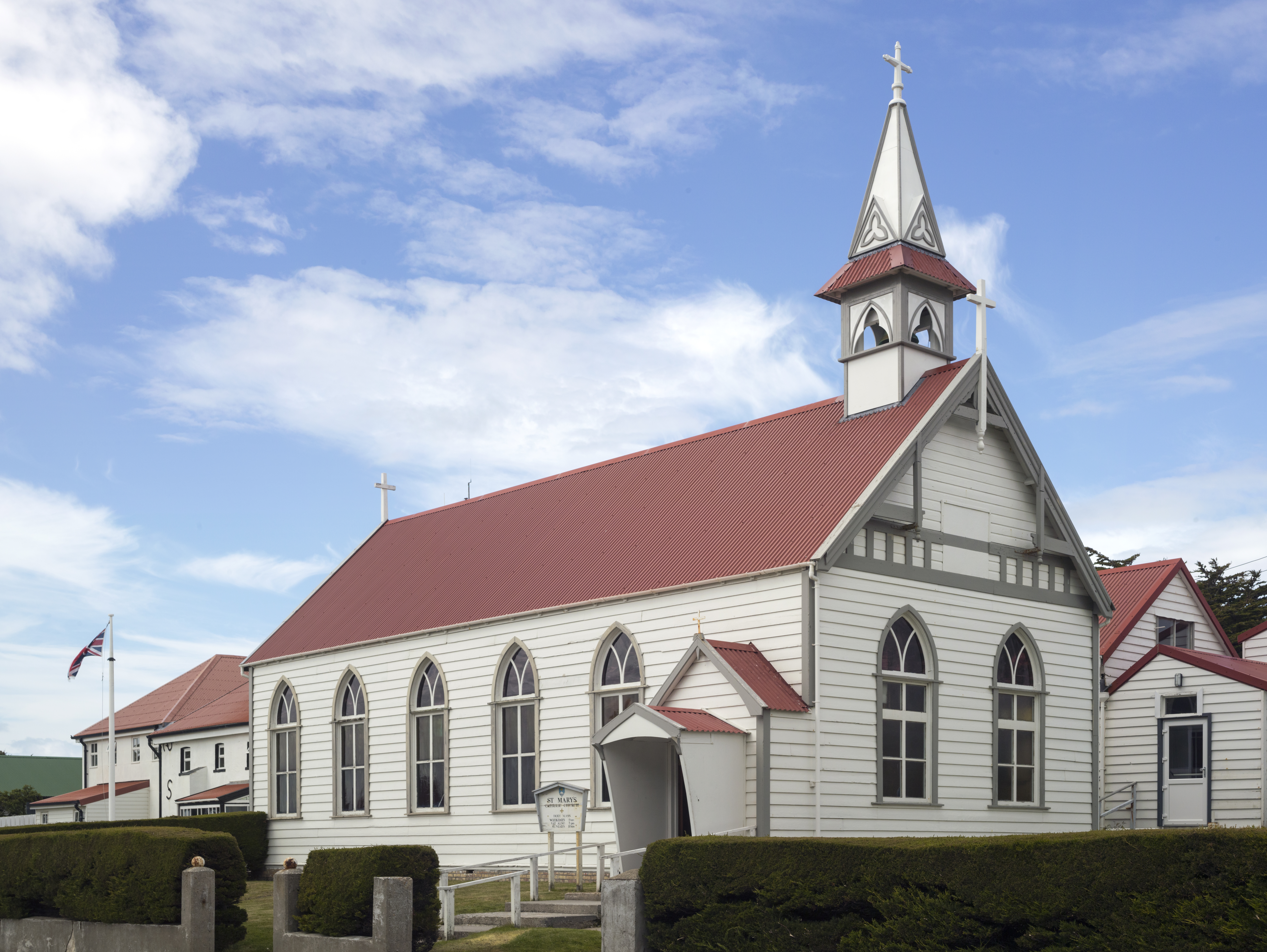
St. Mary's Church, Falkland Islands.

The Catholic faith first arrived to the Falklands with the French settlement started in 1764 by Louis Antoine de Bougainville. With him came Dom Antoine Pernetty, a Benedictine monk.

The first chapel was built by 1768, now by the Spaniards, and was named Nuestra Señora de la Soledad. The chapel proved to be too small, and was replaced by a new church built in brick and stone, in 1801.

After the departure of the Spaniards in 1811, there were no Catholic priests until about 1856, when Father Laurence Kirwan was sent to Stanley on a temporary mission by Anthony Dominic Fahy, chaplain to the Irish in Buenos Aires. In the following years, other priests visited the Islands, and local Catholics started to plan the construction of a church in Stanley. In 1873 the first St. Mary's Church was inaugurated. A new church was finished in 1886, and in 1899 the current church was built.

The Salesians of Don Bosco eventually undertook the pastoral care of the Islands. The first Salesian priest arrived in Stanley on 19th April 1888, and members of his Order remained until early 1952. Among many of them was Father Mario Luis Migone, parish priest from 1905 until his death in 1937.

=== Erection of the Prefecture ===
The Latin missionary jurisdiction was established on 1 October 1952 as an Apostolic Prefecture, splitting the offshore territories of the Falkland Islands, South Georgia and the South Sandwich Islands from the Diocese of Punta Arenas in Chile.

The Apostolic Prefecture of the Falkland Islands has a close relationship with the Mission Sui Iuris of Saint Helena, Ascension Island and Tristan da Cunha. From the start, the office of its ecclesiastical superior has been vested in the Apostolic Prefect of the Falklands.

== List of ordinaries ==
=== Apostolic Prefects (1952-2016) ===
1. Mgr James Ireland MHM (28 March 1952 – 7 May 1973)
2. Mgr Daniel Martin Spraggon MHM (7 May 1973 – died 27 September 1985)
3. Mgr Anton Agreiter MHM (1 October 1986 – 9 August 2002)
4. Mgr Michael Bernard McPartland SMA (9 August 2002 – 26 October 2016)

=== Apostolic Administrators (2016 to present) ===
1. Abbot Hugh Allan OPraem (26 October 2016 – 18 July 2024)
2. Fr Tom Thomas IC (18 July 2024 - present)

== Sources, References and External links ==
- GigaCatholic Falkland Islands, with incumbent biography links
- GigaCatholic Saint Helena, Ascension Island and Tristan da Cunha, with incumbent biographies
- Prefecture Website
