= Parque Provincial Pereyra Iraola =

Urban park in Buenos Aires province, Argentina

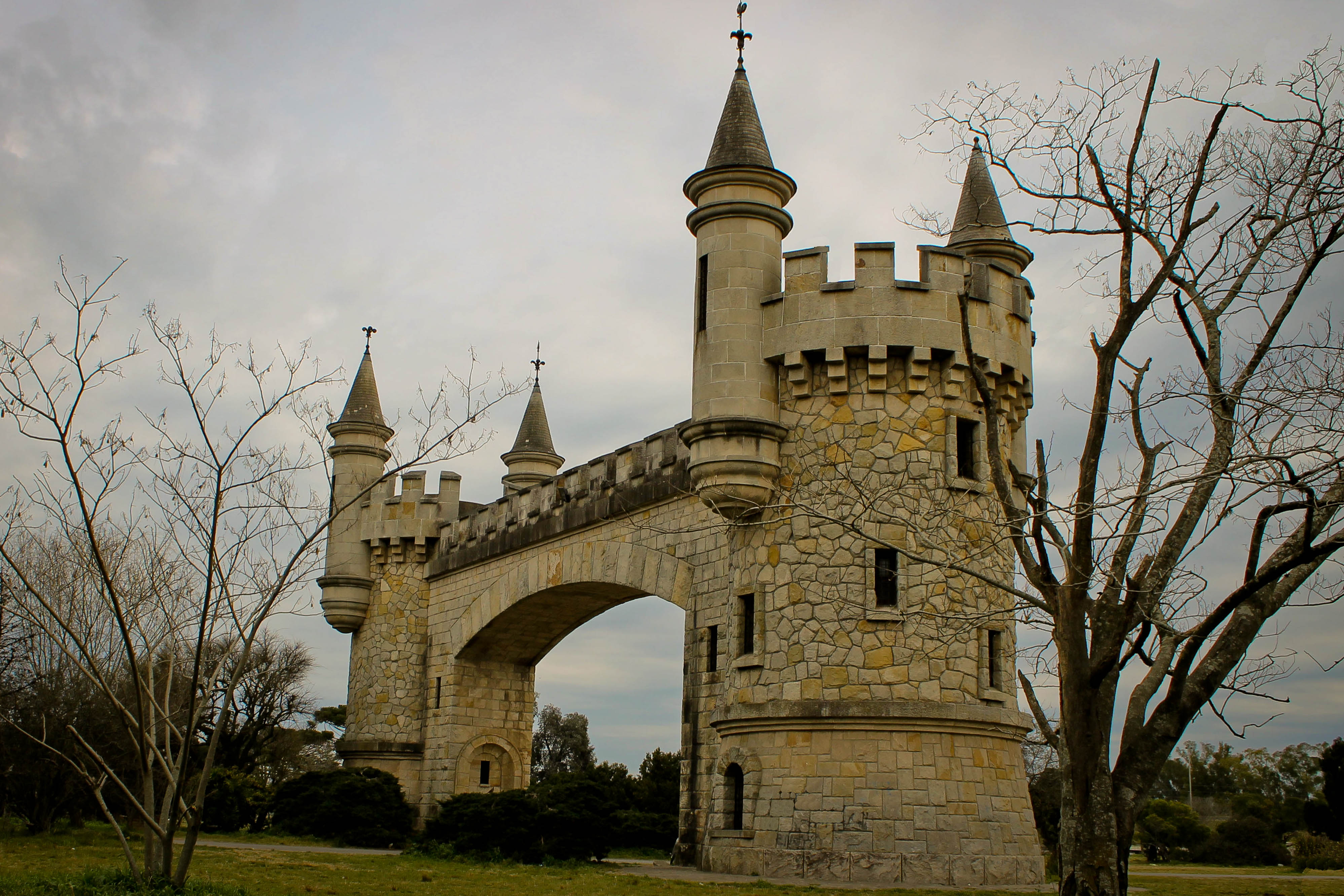
Pereyra Iraola Park entrance arch.

Pereyra Iraola Provincial Park (Spanish: Parque Provincial Pereyra Iraola) is a Provincial Park and is the largest urban park located in the province of Buenos Aires, Argentina. It is the richest center of biodiversity in the province.

The land used to belong to the Pereyra Iraola family, who acquired it from Juana Rita Pinto. In 1949, the family was expropriated by the government headed by General Juan Domingo Peron to build a community park which was opened a year later. The park measures 10,246 hectares and is located between the cities of Berazategui, Ensenada, Florencio Varela and La Plata.

During the second presidency of General Peron, the area encompassing the current park and the train station that links the Buenos Aires train station Constitución with the La Plata train station, were called Derechos de la Ancianidad (trans. "Rights of the Elderly").

== Biosphere Reserve ==
In 2008, UNESCO declared Pereyra Iraola park a Biosphere Reserve. The initiative aims to conserve biodiversity in the park and to prevent it from further development in the area.

== Accusations of improper use ==
In October 2010, a TV program showed that Pereyra Iraola Park is used for purposes other than what was planned for, including landfill operations and a new section of the President Perón highway that would have affected the nature reserve. Recently, the project was suspended.

== Name change ==
On 23 November 2012, the Senate of the province of Buenos Aires approved by the Governor of the Buenos Aires Province granted approval to change the name of the park for Governor Domingo Mercante. The proposal was the provincial initiative of Senator Santiago Carreras, of the Front for Victory political party. It emphasizes that the "goal of changing the name of Parque Pereyra Iraola from Buenos Aires Governor Domingo Mercante, [is to] try to remember and recognize his important management decision to expropriate these lands"
