= James Peck (artist) =

Falklander artist (born 1968)

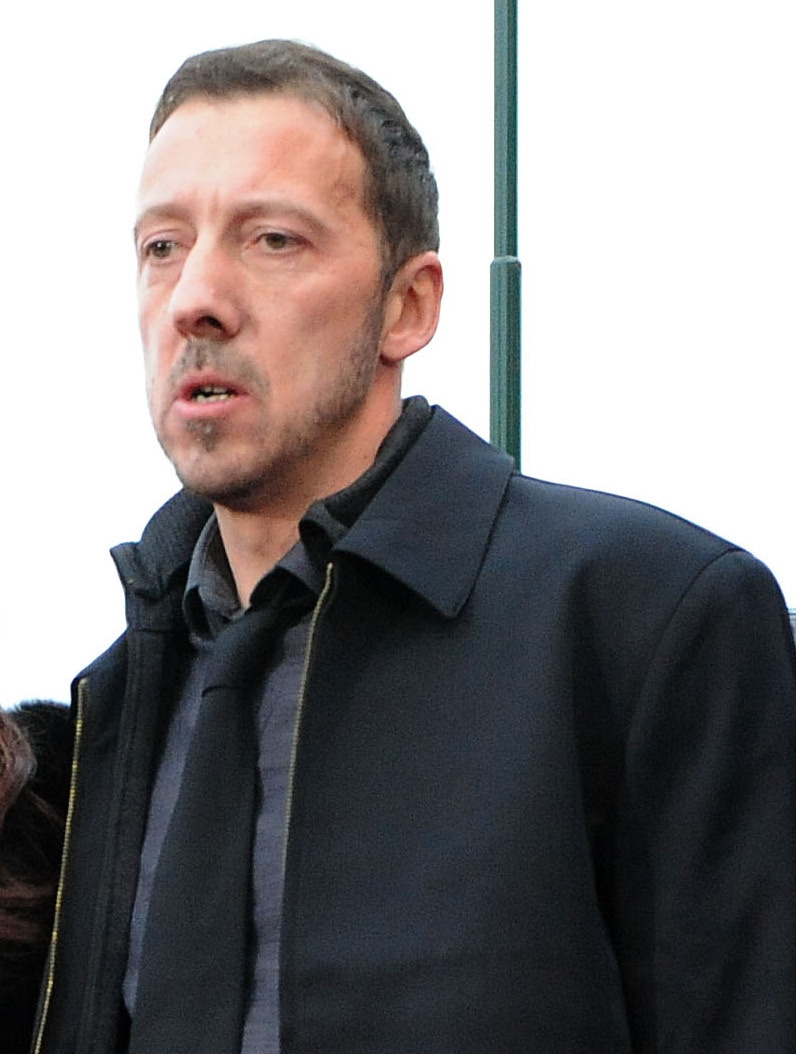
- Peck in 2011.
- Born: 1968 (age 57–58); Stanley, Falkland Islands
- Citizenship: British; Argentine (by law)
- Spouse: María Abriani
- Children: 2
- Parent: Terry Peck (father)

James Peck (born 1968) is a British artist and writer from the Falkland Islands who became internationally known for becoming an Argentine citizen in 2011. He has since publicly regretted his move and returned to live in the Falklands in 2016. Argentine citizenship cannot be reliquished under Argentinian law.

== Life ==
Peck was born in the island's capital, Stanley, and is the fourth generation of his family living in the islands. His family is of English, Scottish and Irish descent. James is the youngest of three brothers. His father, Terry Peck, was the former chief of police in the islands and fought on the British side in the Falklands War in the Battle of Mount Longdon.

James' artistic work features the Falklands War reflecting the suffering of individual soldiers particularly the Argentine conscripts. Whilst exhibiting in Buenos Aires he met and befriended Miguel Savage, an Argentine Veteran of the Falklands War. Savage also fought in the Battle of Mount Longdon and travelled to the islands meeting and staying with Terry Peck before his death from cancer in 2006.

Whilst living in Buenos Aires, Peck met and married the Argentine artist María Abriani. After moving back to the Falklands they had two children. In 2002, there was controversy in the Falkland Islands when officials denied free medical treatment for María whilst pregnant with their first child Jack who was subsequently born in Argentina.

In 2008 Peck unsuccessfully sought election to the Falkland Islands Legislative Council advocating a tougher stance in negotiations with Argentina at a time when the Falkland Islands Government had proposed direct talks with Argentina.

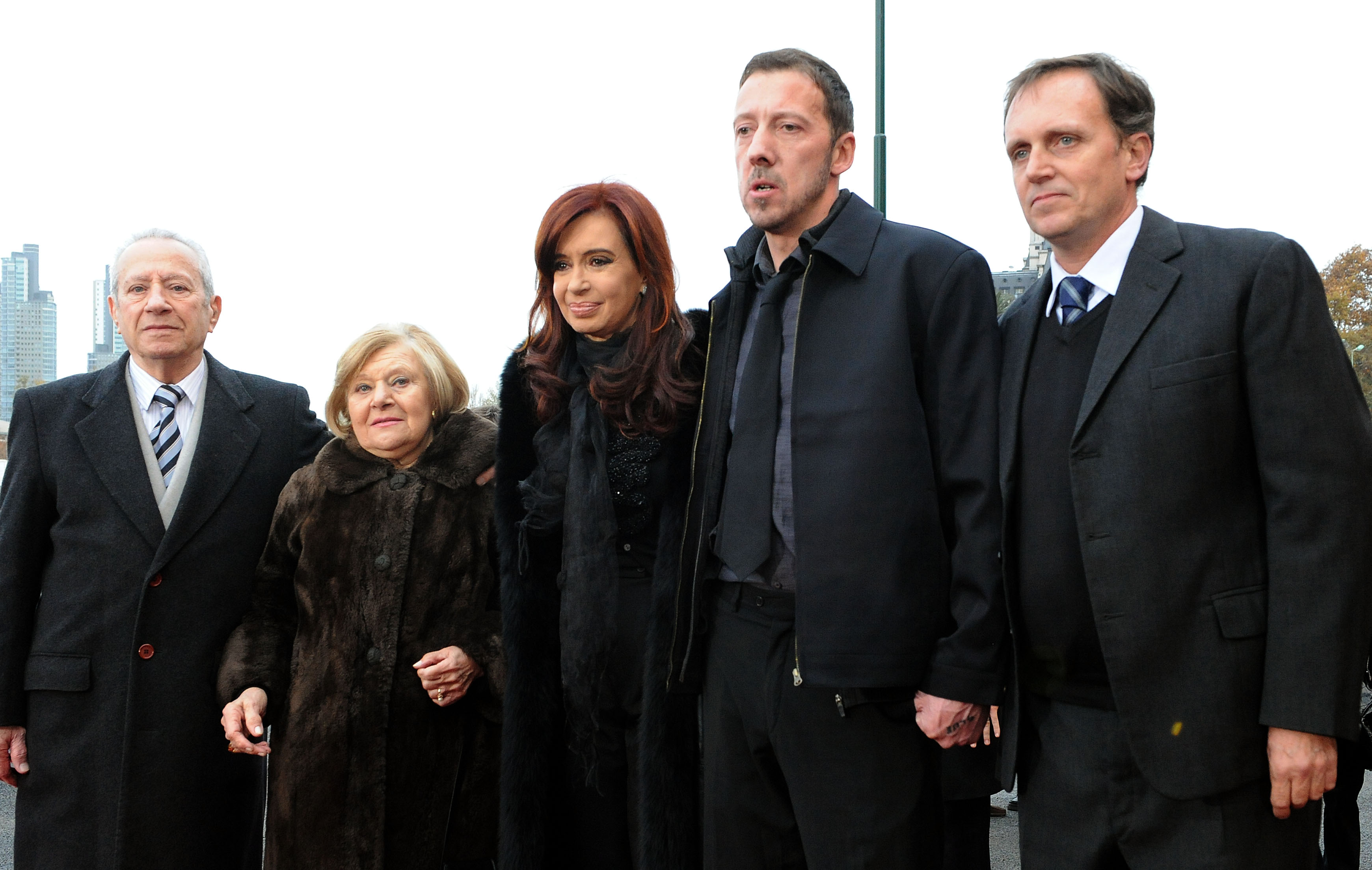
Peck with Cristina Kirchner in 2011

In 2011, it was falsely claimed that he was the first person born in the Falklands to obtain an Argentine birth certificate (this ignores for example Alejandro Betts in 1982, and many others). These reports claim that Argentine law and its sovereignty claim over the archipelago confer citizenship for all those born in the islands, although the Argentine government often describes the islanders as "illegal", "squatters" and "illegally implanted population", relying on the United Nations Resolution 2065.

In a ceremony led by President Kirchner on 14 June, designed to coincide with Liberation Day in the Falkland Islands, he was handed his "Documento Nacional de Identidad" (National Identity Document) and an Argentine passport. Peck stated his main reason for applying for citizenship stemmed from difficulties with Argentine bureaucracy in seeing his two children from his marriage to an Argentine woman and that he did not abandon his British nationality. There was a hostile reaction in the Falklands to the news reports.

In December 2014, Peck returned to the Falklands visiting his sisters and family in the islands. At around the same time, he was summarily dismissed from his job working for the Argentine Government in the National Archives restoring books. A year later, in December 2015, Peck announced on his Facebook page that he had destroyed his DNI card, that he would like to return to the Falklands but "thanks to the gross manipulation by the Argentine Government of my citizenship, in 2011, I cannot.". Peck returned to the Falkland Islands in January 2016. In an interview given to The Guardian he stated that he had applied for citizenship to be with his children in Argentina as Argentina refused to accept he was British for the purposes of his residency application as he was born in the Falklands. He became increasingly disillusioned with life in Argentina, citing pressure to take part in "Malvinas ceremonies" and “I didn’t feel integrated". I felt separated. I had had enough”. Speaking of his children by his former wife “I just want my sons to know my story and that they don’t grow up here tainted by this society that I have given up on. I feel like I lost for not learning to live the Argentina way. I remember writing on my studio wall once, in the islands, that my thirst to make a difference was greater than my fear of being used."
