= Stanley, Falkland Islands =

Chief port and capital city of the Falkland Islands

Stanley
- Capital city
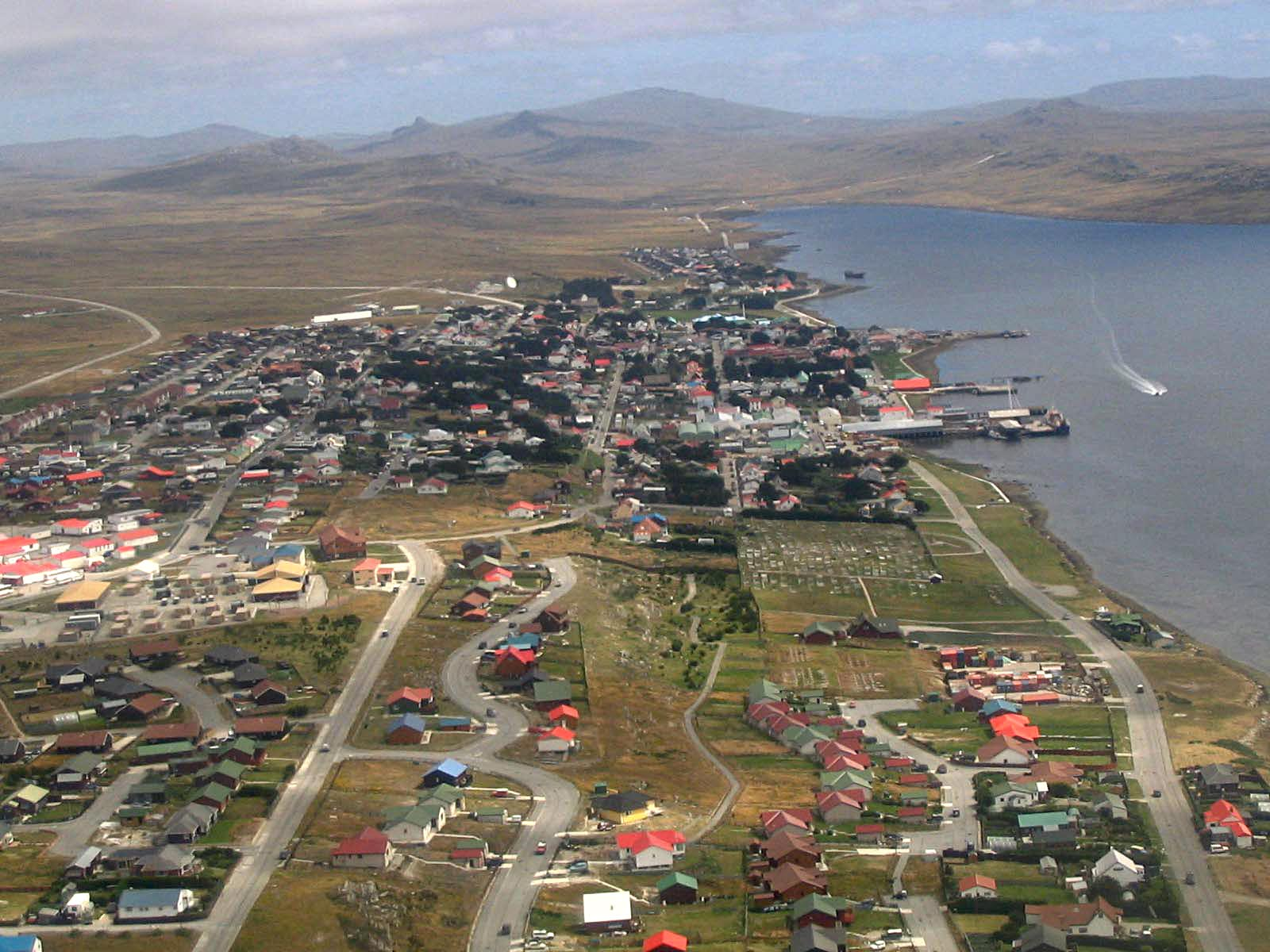
- Aerial view in 2005

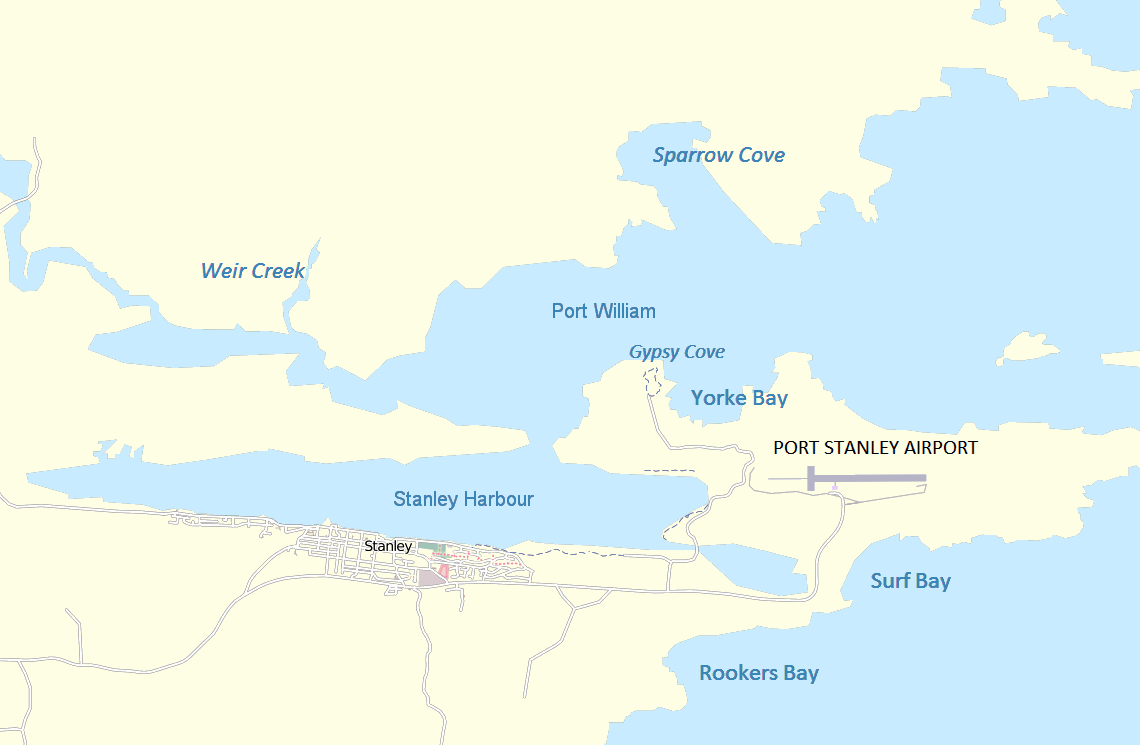
- Map showing the Port Stanley area

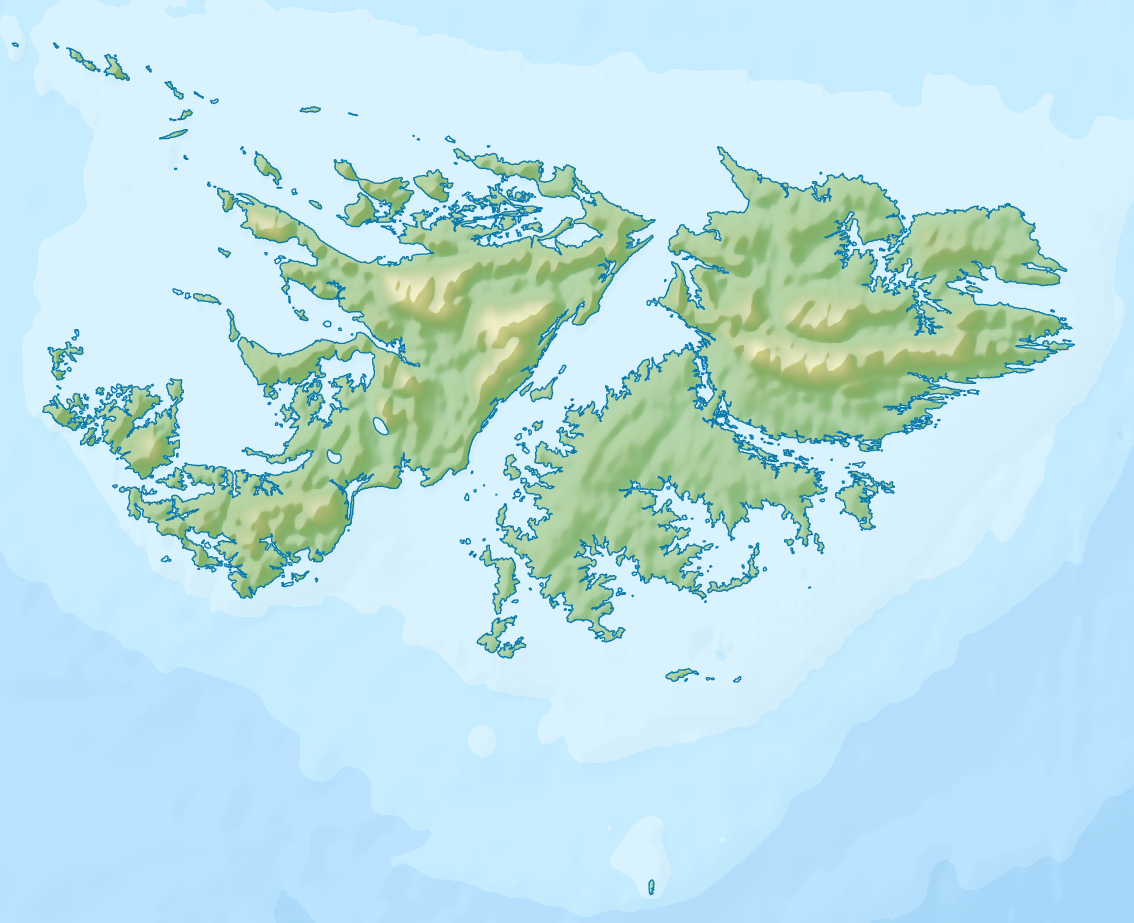
- Stanley within the Falkland Islands Stanley (South America)
- Coordinates: 51°41′42″S 57°51′02″W
- Sovereign state: United Kingdom
- Territory: Falkland Islands
- Settlement established: 1843
- Made capital: July 1845
- Falklands war: 1982
- Awarded city status: June 2022

Area
  - Total: 0.97 sq mi (2.5 km^{2})

Population (2021)
  - Total: 2,974
  - Density: 3,100/sq mi (1,200/km^{2})
- Time zone: UTC−3 (FKST^{[a]})

Stanley (also known as Port Stanley) is the capital city of the Falkland Islands. It is located on the island of East Falkland, on a north-facing slope in one of the wettest parts of the islands. At the 2021 census, the city had a population of 2,974, accounting for 81% of the entire population of the Falkland Islands, which was 3,662 on Census Day – 10 October 2021.

Stanley is represented by five of the eight elected members of the Legislative Assembly of the Falkland Islands: Stacy Bragger, Barry Elsby, Mark Pollard, Roger Spink, and Leona Vidal Roberts. An elected Town Council of Stanley existed from 1948 to 1973.

On 14 June 2022, during the Platinum Jubilee Civic Honours, Stanley received letters patent, formally awarding it city status. It is the southernmost capital of a self-governing territory or state.

== Facilities and infrastructure ==
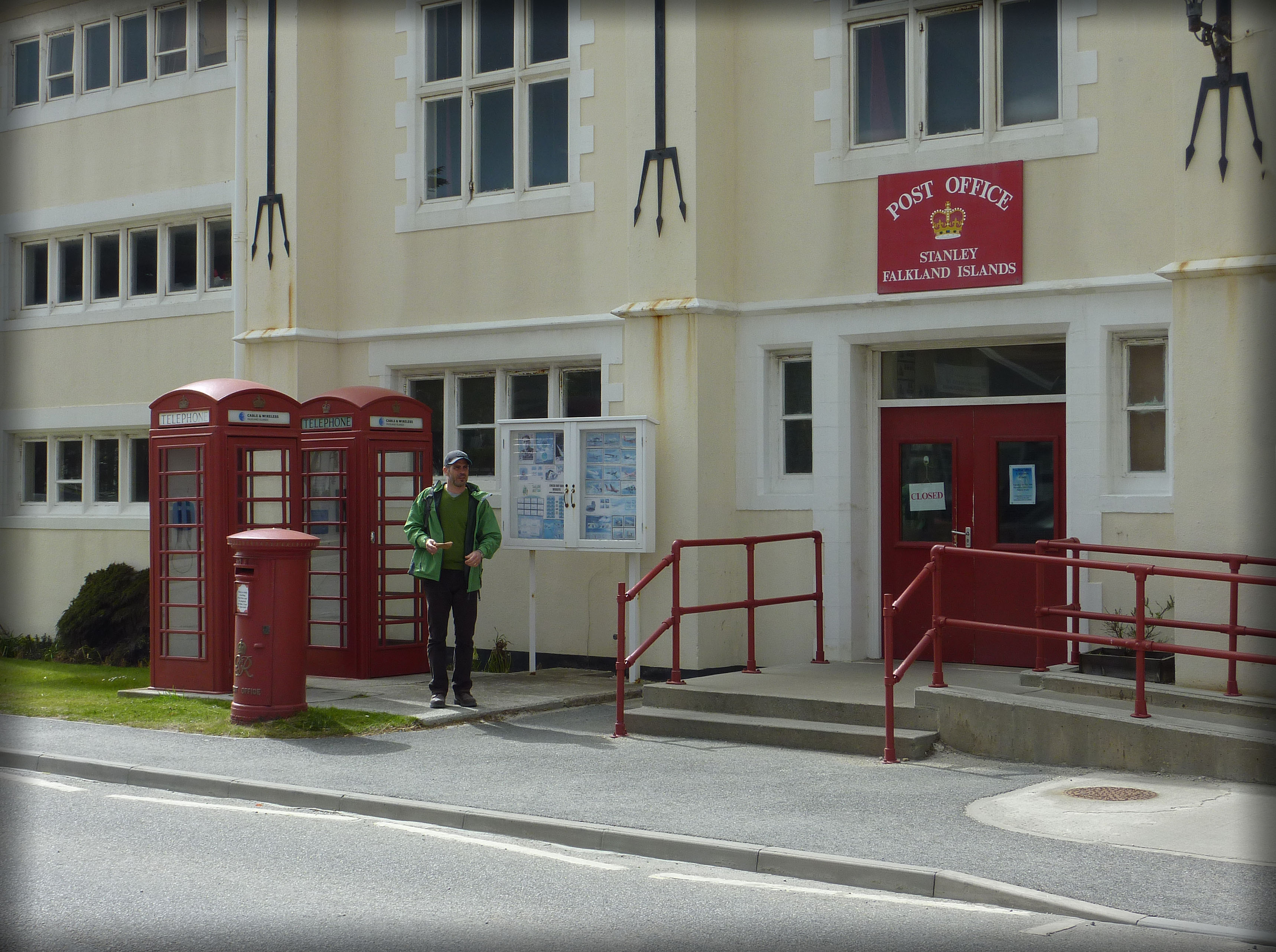
Stanley post office, with British red post and telephone boxes.

Stanley is the main shopping centre on the islands and the hub of East Falkland's road network. Attractions include the Falkland Islands Museum, Government House—built in 1845 and home to the Governor of the Falkland Islands—and a golf course, as well as a whale-bone arch, a totem pole, several war memorials and the shipwrecks in its harbour. The Falkland Islands Company owns several shops. Stanley has four pubs, 11 hotels and guesthouses, three restaurants, a fish and chip shop and the main tourist office. There are three churches, including the Anglican Christ Church Cathedral, the southernmost Anglican cathedral in the world, and the Roman Catholic St. Mary's Church. A bomb disposal unit in the town is a legacy of the Falklands War.

The town hall serves as a post office, philatelic bureau, law court, and dance hall. The police station also contains the islands' only prison, with capacity for 13 inmates.

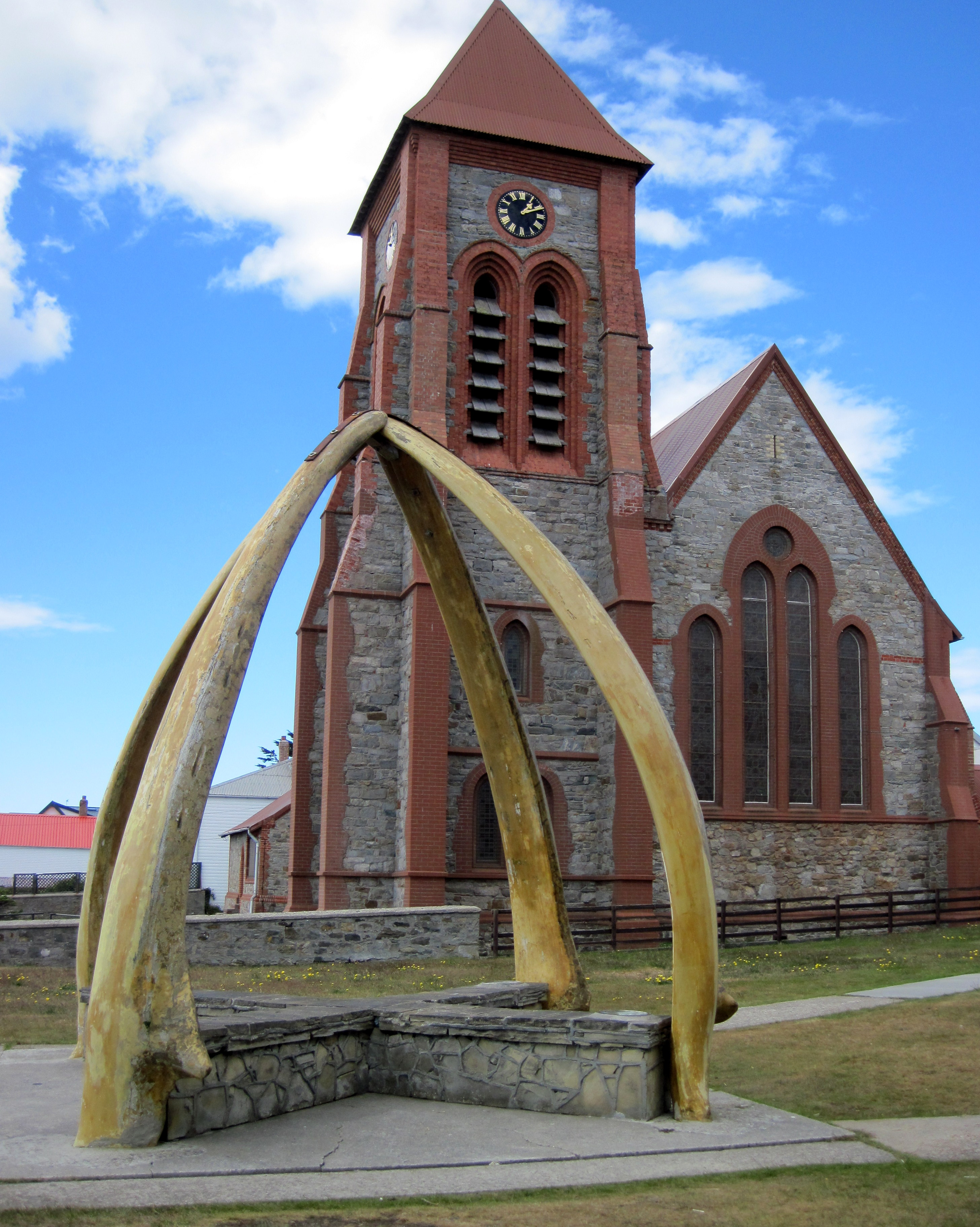
The cathedral and whalebone arch

The community centre includes a swimming pool (the only public one in the islands), a sports centre, and a school. A grass football pitch is located by the community centre. A separate building houses the college of further education and the library. A new sports centre is under construction to the south of the town centre, next to a newly-laid floodlit all-weather pitch.

Stanley Racecourse, located on the west side of Stanley, holds a two-day horse racing meeting every year on 26 and 27 December. The Christmas races have been held here for over 100 years.

Stanley Golf Course has an 18-hole course and a club house. It is also located to the west of Stanley.

King Edward VII Memorial Hospital is the islands' main hospital, with doctors' practice and surgery, radiology department, dental surgery and emergency facilities.

The Port Stanley Airport operates internal flights, and scheduled international passenger flights operate from the RAF Mount Pleasant military airbase.

Stanley is also home to the Falkland Islands Radio Station (FIRS), the Stanley office of the British Antarctic Survey, and the office of the weekly Penguin News newspaper.

== History ==
The original capital of the islands was at Port Louis to the north of the present site of Stanley, on Berkeley Sound. Captains Francis Crozier and James Clark Ross were recruited by Governor Richard Moody in his quest to find a new capital for The Falklands. Both Crozier and Ross (who are remembered in Crozier Place and Ross Road in Stanley) were among the Royal Navy's most distinguished seafarers. They spent five months in the islands with their ships Terror and Erebus, later lost looking for the Northwest Passage. Governor Moody (after whom Moody Brook is named), however, decided to move the capital to Port Jackson, which was renamed "Stanley Harbour", after a survey. Stanley Harbour was considered to have a deeper anchorage for visiting ships. Not all the inhabitants were happy with the change; a JW Whitington is recorded as saying, "Of all the miserable bog holes, I believe that Mr Moody has selected one of the worst for the site of his town."

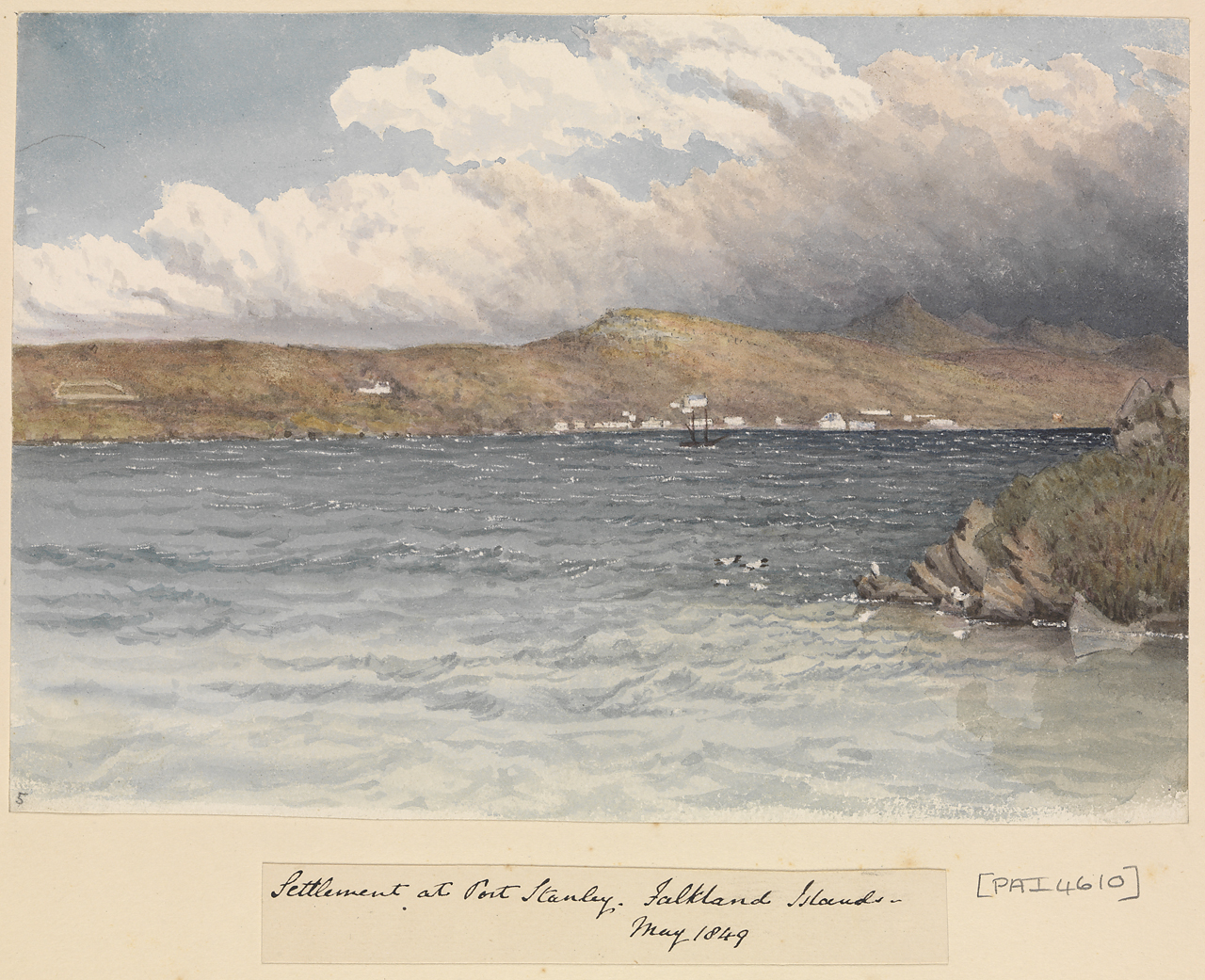
Settlement at Port Stanley, May 1849, by Edward Fanshawe

Work on the settlement began in 1843 and it became the capital in July 1845. It was named after Lord Stanley, Secretary of State for War and the Colonies at the time. In 1849, 30 married Chelsea Pensioners were settled there to help with the defence of the islands and to develop the new settlement.

The settlement soon grew as a deep-water port, specialising at first in ship repairs; before the construction of the Panama Canal, Port Stanley was a major repair stop for ships travelling through the Straits of Magellan. The rough waters and intense storms found at the tip of the continent forced many ships to Stanley Harbour, and the ship repair industry helped to drive the island economy. Later it became a base for whaling and sealing in the South Atlantic and Antarctic.

Later still it was an important coaling station for the Royal Navy. This led to ships based here being involved in the Battle of the Falkland Islands in the First World War, and the Battle of the River Plate in the Second World War.

Landslides caused by excessive peat cutting destroyed part of the town in 1879 and again in 1886, which killed two people. At about midnight on 29 November 1878 a black moving mass, several feet high, was moving forwards at a rate of 4 miles per hour (6.4 km/h) or 5 miles per hour (8.0 km/h). The next morning the town was cut in two; the only way to travel between the two parts was by boat.

During the Second World War, a hulk in Stanley Harbour was used for interning the British Fascist and Mosleyite Jeffrey Hamm. A minor figure in the British Union of Fascists (BUF) at the time, Hamm moved to the Falkland Islands in 1939 to work as a teacher. He was arrested there (under Defence Regulation 18B) in 1940 for encouraging fascist views among his pupils and his BUF membership and later transferred to a prison camp in South Africa.

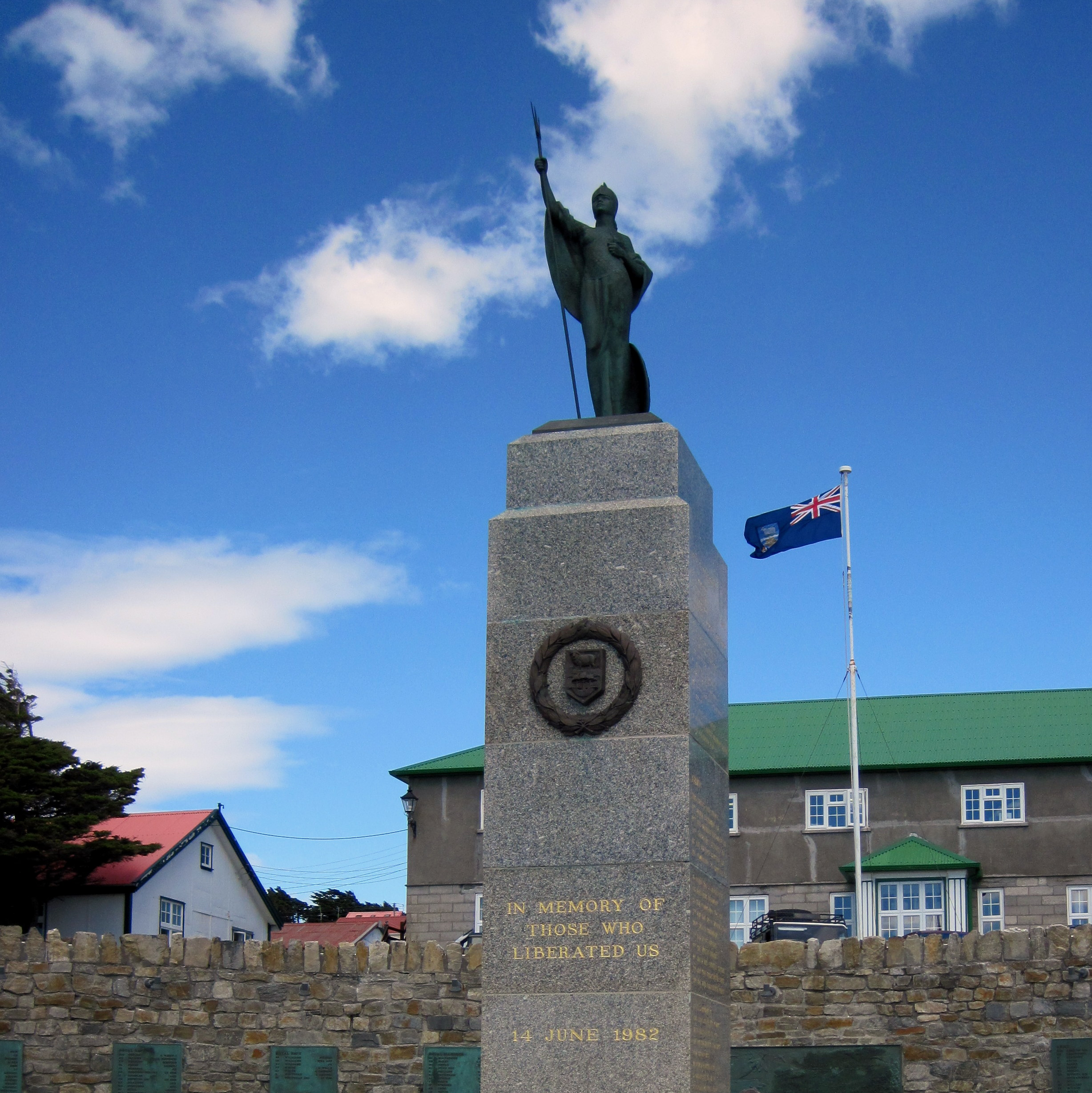
The 1982 Liberation Memorial, Stanley

Stanley Airport is used by internal flights and provides connections to British bases in Antarctica. Flights to Argentina ended after the 1982 conflict. A weekly flight to Punta Arenas in Chile commenced in 1993, which now operates out of RAF Mount Pleasant. Scheduled passenger flights between the Mount Pleasant airfield and the UK are also operated twice a week by a civilian airline contractor on behalf of the Royal Air Force.

Stanley was occupied by Argentine troops for about 10 weeks during the Falklands War in 1982. The Argentinians renamed the town Puerto Argentino, and although Spanish names for places in the Falklands were historically accepted as alternatives, this one is considered to be extremely offensive by many islanders. Stanley suffered considerable damage during the war, from both the Argentine occupation and the British naval shelling of the town, which killed three civilians. After the British secured the high ground around the town the Argentines surrendered with no fighting in the town itself. The beaches and land around it were heavily mined and some areas remain marked minefields.

Since the Falklands War, Stanley has benefited from the growth of the fishing and tourism industries in the Islands. Stanley itself has developed greatly in that time, with the building of a large amount of residential housing, particularly to the east of the town centre. Stanley is now more than a third bigger than it was in 1982.

In 2022, as part of Queen Elizabeth II's Platinum Jubilee Civic Honours, Stanley was one of the successful bids for city status, coinciding with the 40th anniversary of the invasion and liberation of the port. On 14 June 2022, Stanley received letters patent from the monarch awarding city status. The Governor of the Falkland Islands, Nigel Phillips, read out the document outside the town hall on the same day.

== Etymology ==
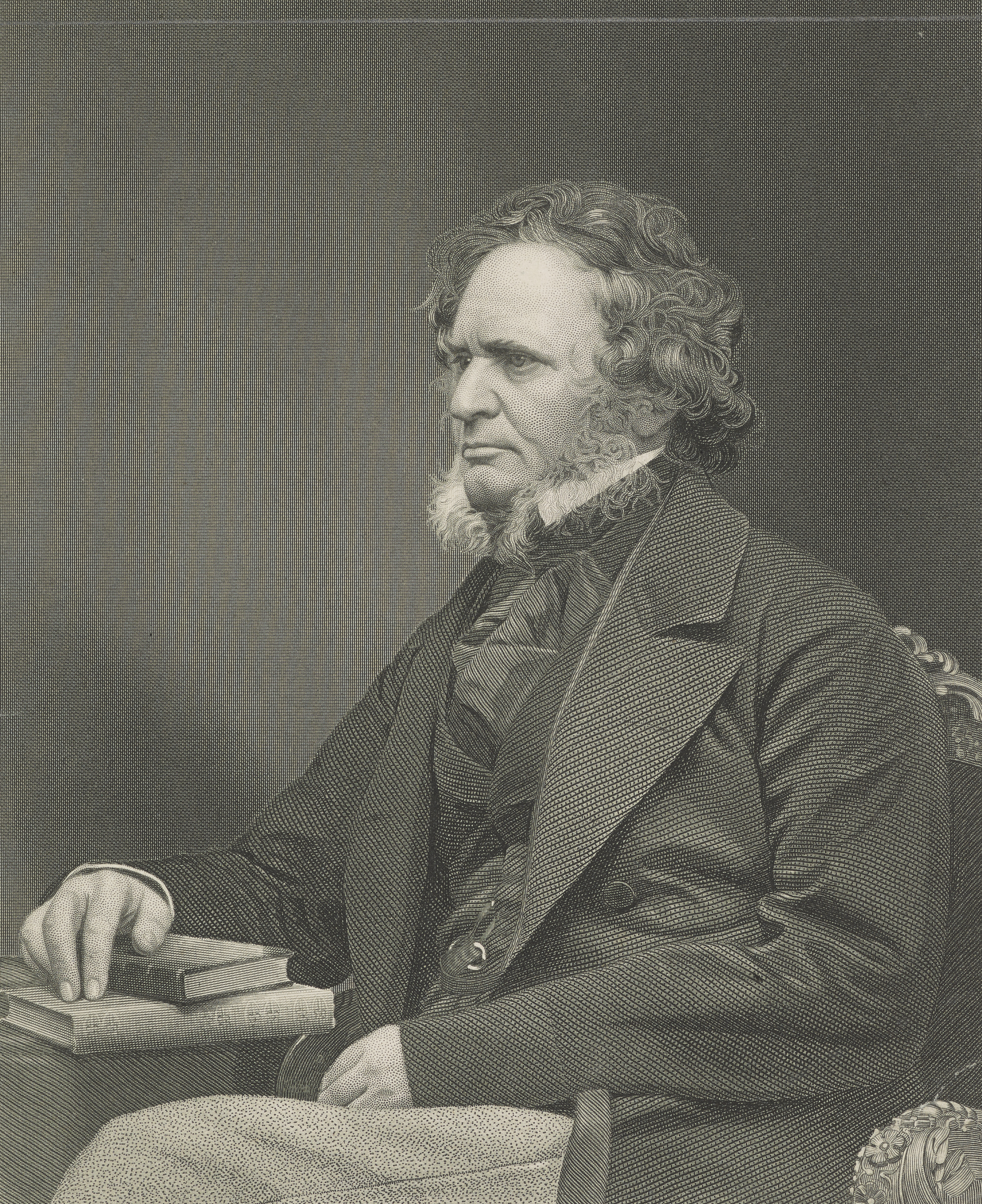
Stanley is named after The 14th Earl of Derby, who was known as Lord Stanley between 1834 and 1851.

A number of variants of the city's name have appeared in both English and Spanish. Stanley Harbour was originally known as "Port Jackson", and this name would have applied to the area before the town was built. Although the town is officially known as "Stanley", it is frequently referred to as "Port Stanley", especially in British reports about the Falklands War. This is in line with various other settlements around the islands, e.g. Port Howard and Port Stephens. However, "Stanley" without the "Port" prefix was established long before the war, and on 2 August 1956, the Officer Administering the Government of the Falkland Islands reported to the Secretary of State for the Colonies in London as follows:

There is some difficulty over the correct name of the capital. Early despatches contain reference to both Port Stanley and Stanley. Port Stanley was accepted by the Naming Commission set up in 1943 to consider the names then being included on the War Office maps. Local opinion differs on the matter, but there is no doubt that Stanley is now common usage and has been for some considerable time. The capital is defined as Stanley in the Interpretation and General Law Ordinance. In the circumstances I would advise that the correct name for the capital is Stanley.

=== Spanish and Argentine names ===
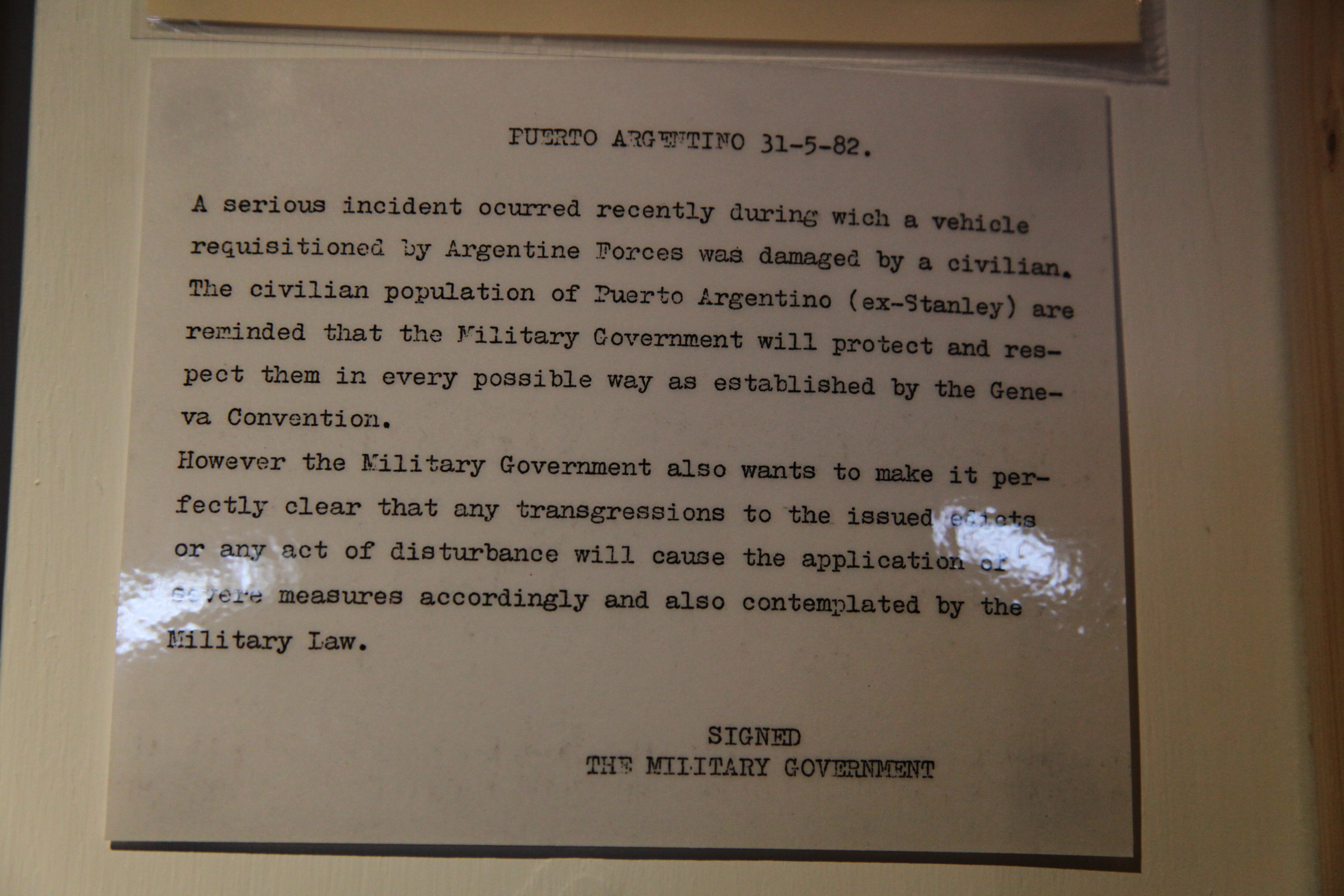
A message issued by the Argentine Military Governor during the occupation in which the capital is referred to as "Puerto Argentino (ex-Stanley)".

The situation with the Spanish version of the name is far more complicated. Stanley, unlike Port Louis, the former capital of the islands, was a new settlement founded by the British, and therefore did not have a Spanish name of its own. Many Spanish speakers use "Puerto Stanley", as a neutral translation of the British name, but it is disliked by supporters of Argentine sovereignty who refuse to recognise English language names. Supporters of the Argentine claim have used several different names, none of which are accepted by the islanders themselves:

- Puerto Soledad (the port of East Falkland, known in Spanish as Isla Soledad) – reported in 1965, but in fact the old Spanish name of Port Louis, the old capital, not Stanley.
- Puerto Rivero – a reference to Antonio Rivero, a controversial Argentine figure in the early history of the islands. Used by peronists and the hijackers of Aerolineas Argentinas Flight 648 who landed at Stanley in September 1966. It was also used on 3–4 April 1982 after the Argentine invasion.
- Puerto de la Isla Soledad – a variant on Puerto Soledad. Used 5 April 1982.
- Puerto de las Islas Malvinas (Port of the Malvinas/Falklands), used from 6–20 April 1982.
- Puerto Argentino (Port Argentine) – used ever since 21 April 1982 by the Argentines, although in 1994 the Argentine Government signed an undertaking to review toponymy relating to the Argentine occupation of the islands.

During the 1982 occupation, Patrick Watts of the islands' radio station used circumlocutions to avoid using Argentine names:

"It hurt me greatly to call it [the radio station] Radio Nacional Islas Malvinas, and I used to try to avoid referring to Port Stanley as Puerto Argentino. I called it 'the capital' or the 'largest settlement on the island'"

— Eyewitness Falklands: A personal account of the Falklands campaign

== Climate ==
The climate of Stanley is classified as a subpolar oceanic climate (Köppen Cfc), bordering very closely on a polar climate (ET). Nowadays it barely avoids classification as ET because the mean temperature is greater than 10 °C (50 °F) for two months of the year. Unlike typical tundra climates, however, the winters are very mild, and vegetation grows there that normally could not in a climate this close to a polar climate. Contrast this with Churchill, Manitoba, which also has a near-tundra climate but is much more continental in nature.

The Falkland Islands have displayed a warming trend in recent years; the mean daily January maximum for Mount Pleasant for the years 1999-2012 is 15.1 °C (59.2 °F) compared to Stanley's 1961-90 average of 14.1 °C (57.4 °F). Formerly, Stanley had a tundra climate (ET), due to cool summer temperatures (the mean temperature was less than 10 °C or 50 °F in the hottest month).

Like the rest of the archipelago, Stanley has more or less even temperatures through the year and strong westerlies. Precipitation, averaging 544 mm (21.42 in) a year, is nonetheless relatively low, and evenly spread throughout the year. Typically, at least 1 mm (0.039 in) of rain will be recorded on 125.2 days of the year. The islands receive 36.3% of possible sunshine, or around 1500–1600 hours a year, a level similar to southern parts of England. Daytime temperatures are similar to the Northern Isles of Scotland, though nights tend to be somewhat colder, with frost occurring on more than 1 in 3 nights (128.4 nights). Snow occurs in the winter. Light snowfall can occur at any time of year.

Stanley is a similar distance from the equator to British warm-summer climates like London, Cardiff and Bristol, illustrating the relative chilliness of the climate. In the northern hemisphere, lowland tundra areas are located at latitudes further from the tropics. Many European capitals are also located much farther from the tropics than Stanley is. The nearest larger city of Río Gallegos (the provincial capital of Santa Cruz) in Argentina has a slightly milder climate (annual mean temperature being 1.7 °C (3.1 °F) higher) due to its position on the South American mainland, although summers everywhere on this latitude in the southern hemisphere are very cool due to important marine effects.

Temperature extremes at Stanley vary from −11.1 °C (12.0 °F) to 26.1 °C (79.0 °F). More recently, on 23 January 1992, nearby Mount Pleasant Airport recorded 29.2 °C (84.6 °F).

Climate data for Stanley, 1961–1990 normals
Month	Jan	Feb	Mar	Apr	May	Jun	Jul	Aug	Sep	Oct	Nov	Dec	Year
Record high °C (°F)	24 (75)	23 (73)	21 (70)	17 (63)	14 (57)	11 (52)	10 (50)	11 (52)	15 (59)	18 (64)	22 (72)	22 (72)	24 (75)
Mean daily maximum °C (°F)	14.1 (57.4)	14.0 (57.2)	12.8 (55.0)	10.3 (50.5)	7.4 (45.3)	5.6 (42.1)	5.1 (41.2)	6.0 (42.8)	7.7 (45.9)	9.9 (49.8)	11.9 (53.4)	13.4 (56.1)	9.8 (49.6)
Daily mean °C (°F)	9.6 (49.3)	9.7 (49.5)	8.6 (47.5)	6.5 (43.7)	4.0 (39.2)	2.5 (36.5)	2.0 (35.6)	2.5 (36.5)	3.8 (38.8)	5.7 (42.3)	7.3 (45.1)	8.8 (47.8)	5.9 (42.6)
Mean daily minimum °C (°F)	5.1 (41.2)	5.4 (41.7)	4.5 (40.1)	2.7 (36.9)	0.7 (33.3)	−0.5 (31.1)	−1.2 (29.8)	−1.0 (30.2)	−0.2 (31.6)	1.5 (34.7)	2.7 (36.9)	4.4 (39.9)	2.0 (35.6)
Record low °C (°F)	−1 (30)	−1 (30)	−3 (27)	−6 (21)	−7 (19)	−11 (12)	−9 (16)	−11 (12)	−11 (12)	−6 (21)	−3 (27)	−2 (28)	−11 (12)
Average precipitation mm (inches)	63 (2.5)	45 (1.8)	52 (2.0)	50 (2.0)	48 (1.9)	45 (1.8)	41 (1.6)	38 (1.5)	34 (1.3)	36 (1.4)	39 (1.5)	52 (2.0)	544 (21.4)
Average rainy days	17	12	15	14	15	13	13	13	12	11	12	15	162
Average relative humidity (%)	78	79	83	87	88	89	90	87	84	80	74	76	83
Source: Climatic Research Unit, University of East Anglia

Climate data for RAF Mount Pleasant, 1999–2012
Month	Jan	Feb	Mar	Apr	May	Jun	Jul	Aug	Sep	Oct	Nov	Dec	Year
Mean daily maximum °C (°F)	15.1 (59.2)	14.7 (58.5)	13.0 (55.4)	9.8 (49.6)	7.0 (44.6)	4.9 (40.8)	4.3 (39.7)	5.5 (41.9)	7.4 (45.3)	10.1 (50.2)	12.0 (53.6)	14.0 (57.2)	9.8 (49.6)
Daily mean °C (°F)	10.9 (51.6)	10.6 (51.1)	9.3 (48.7)	6.8 (44.2)	4.5 (40.1)	2.7 (36.9)	2.2 (36.0)	3.0 (37.4)	4.4 (39.9)	6.4 (43.5)	7.9 (46.2)	9.7 (49.5)	6.5 (43.7)
Mean daily minimum °C (°F)	6.6 (43.9)	6.6 (43.9)	5.5 (41.9)	3.7 (38.7)	2.1 (35.8)	0.5 (32.9)	0.1 (32.2)	0.5 (32.9)	1.3 (34.3)	2.7 (36.9)	3.9 (39.0)	5.5 (41.9)	3.3 (37.9)
Average precipitation days	23	21	23	24	26	26	25	24	21	21	23	23	280
Source: WeatherSpark

== Education ==
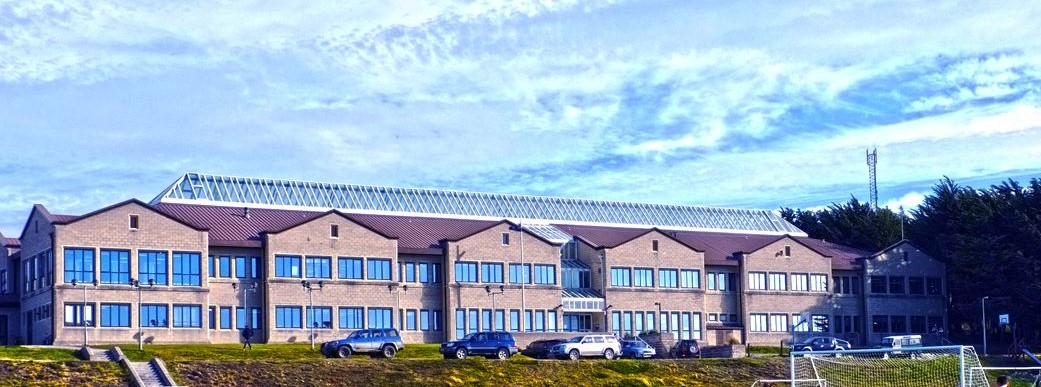
Falkland Islands Community School

The Stanley Infant & Junior School (IJS) is located along John Street at the intersection with Villiers Street in Stanley. The school first opened in 1955 and has about 250 students between the ages of four and 11.

The Falkland Islands Community School (FICS) is located on Reservoir Road in Stanley. It has approximately 220 students between 11 and 16.

== Economy ==
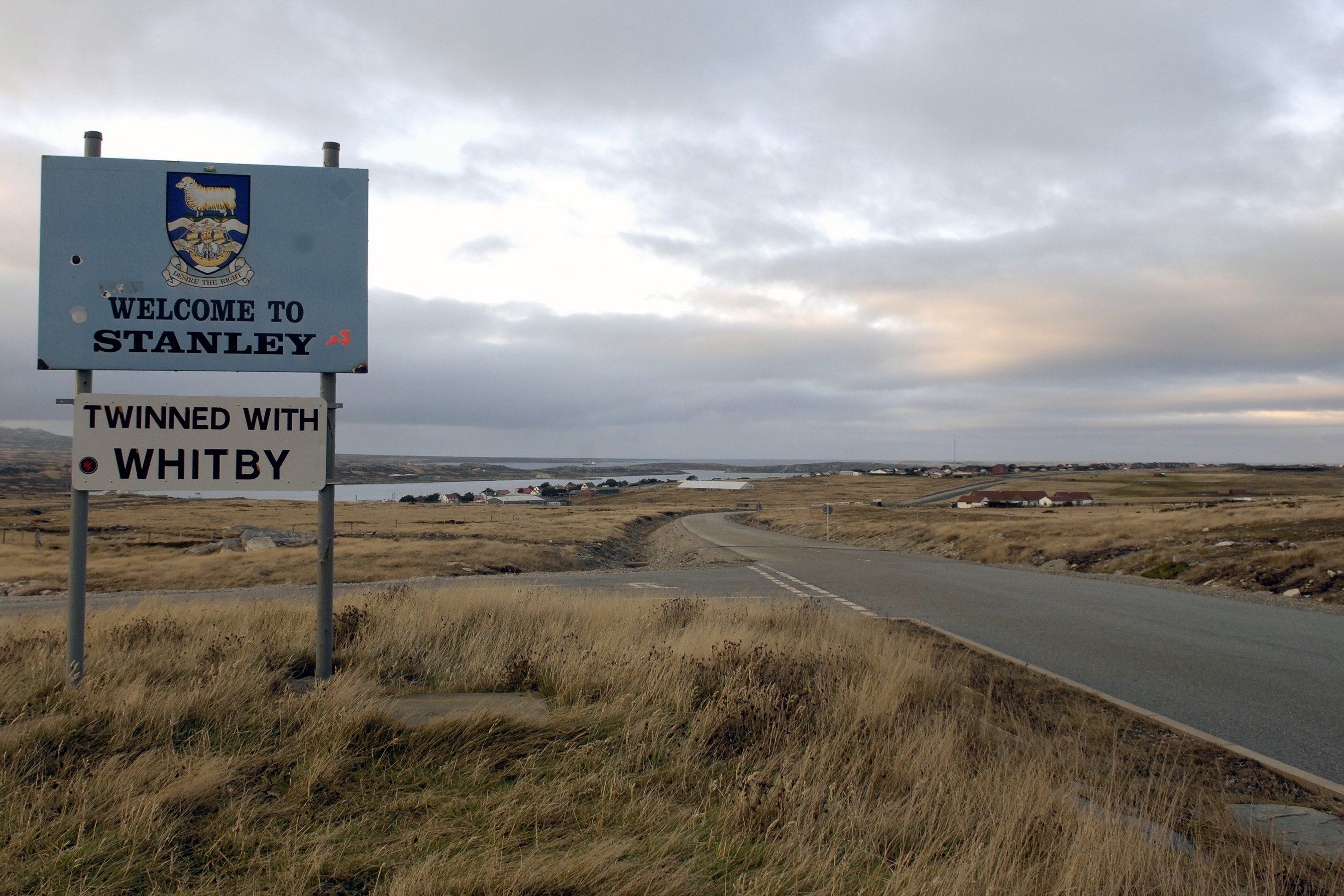
'Welcome to Stanley' sign, with Stanley in the background

Today, roughly one third of the city's residents are employed by the government, and tourism is also a major source of employment. On days when two or more large cruise ships dock in the town, tourists frequently outnumber the local residents.

Peat was once a prominent heating/fuel source in Stanley, and stacks of drying peat under cover can still be seen by the occasional house.

== Nearby points of interest ==
Gypsy Cove, known for its Magellanic penguins, and Cape Pembroke, the easternmost point of the Falklands, lie nearby. Gypsy Cove is four miles (6 km) from Stanley and can be reached by taxi or on foot.

== Notable people associated with Stanley ==
- George Rennie (1801 or 1802 in Phantassie, East Lothian – 1860 in London), sculptor, politician and governor
- Mary Ellaline Terriss, Lady Hicks (1871 in Stanley – 1971 (aged 100) in Hampstead, London), known professionally as Ellaline Terriss, a popular English actress and singer, best known for her performances in Edwardian musical comedies
- Edward Binnie (1884 in Stanley – 1956 in Sandefjord, Norway), the second resident magistrate of South Georgia, serving from October 1914 to April 1927, when he resided at King Edward Point; previously served as customs officer on East Falkland Island
- McDonald Hobley (1917 in Stanley – 1987), one of the first BBC Television continuity announcers from 1946 to 1956
- Sir Rex Hunt CMG (1926 in Redcar – 2012 in Stockton on Tees), Governor during the Falklands War
- Gerald Reive (born 1937 in the Falkland Islands), a New Zealand-based athlete, a lawn bowler at the 2010 Commonwealth Games
- Terry Peck MBE, CPM (1938 – 2006 both in Stanley), soldier, policeman and legislator
- Edward Neill "Ted" Baker CNZM (born 1942 in Stanley), a New Zealand scientist specialising in protein purification and crystallization and bioinformatics
- Alejandro Betts (1947 – 2020), a Falklands-born Argentine air-traffic controller, notable for being the only Falkland Islander to support Argentina's claim to the Falkland Islands
- Mensun Bound (born 1953 in Port Stanley) is a British marine archaeologist, based in Oxford, Triton Senior Research Fellow in Marine Archaeology at Oxford University
- James Peck (born 1968 in Stanley), an artist and writer who at one time held both Argentine and British citizenship but has since renounced his Argentine citizenship.

=== Modern-day politicians ===
- Janet Lynda Cheek (born 1948 in Stanley) is a politician, served as a MLA for the Stanley constituency from 1997 to 2005 and from 2009 to 2017
- Mike Summers OBE (born 1952 in Stanley) is a politician, served as a MLA for the Stanley constituency from 2011 to 2017
- Sharon Halford (born 1953 in Stanley) is a politician, served as a MLA for the Camp constituency from 1993 to 2001 and from 2009 until 2013
- Glenn Ross (born 1964 in Stanley) is an engineer and politician, served as a MLA for the Stanley constituency from 2009 to 2011
- Michael Poole (born 1984 in Falkland Islands) is a politician, served as a MLA for the Stanley constituency from 2013 to 2017
- Gavin Short (born 1962 in Falkland Islands) is a politician and served as a MLA for the Stanley constituency between 2009 and 2017. He is currently a senior news reporter with FIRS and was re-elected in the 2021 elections.

== Twin towns ==
Stanley is twinned with Whitby in North Yorkshire, and Portsmouth in Hampshire, both in the United Kingdom.

== See also ==
- Falklands War
- Battle of Wireless Ridge
- RAF Mount Pleasant

== Bibliography ==
- Wagstaff, William Falkland Islands: The Bradt Travel Guide
- Patrick Watts quoted in Fox, Robert Eyewitness Falklands: A personal account of the Falklands campaign, 1982, p309.
- The Toponymy of the Falkland Islands as recorded on Maps and in Gazetteers The Permanent Committee on Geographical Names for British Official Use.
- Southby-Tailyour, Ewen – Falkland Island Shores
- The European (pub by British Union of Fascists), vol 8, issue 5 (January 1957 p 313-9)
- PRO HO 45/25740 "Jeffrey Hamm" (British Public Records)
