= List of Falkland Islands–related topics =

The location of the British Overseas Territory of the Falkland Islands

Duplicate: Index of Falkland Islands–related articles

The following is an outline of topics related to the British Overseas Territory of the Falkland Islands.

== Falkland Islands ==
- Falkland Islands
- Template:Falkland Islands topics
- Bodie Suspension Bridge
- Falkland Islands at the 2006 Commonwealth Games
- Anthony Cary, 5th Viscount of Falkland
- Geology of the Falkland Islands
- List of fish on stamps of the Falkland Islands
- Port Stanley Airport
- Chris Simpkins
- Transport in the Falkland Islands

== Communications in the Falkland Islands ==
- Communications in the Falkland Islands

== Economy of the Falkland Islands ==
- Economy of the Falkland Islands
- Coins of the Falkland Islands pound
- Falkland Islands Holdings
- Falkland Islands pound

== Falkland Islander culture ==
- Culture of the Falkland Islands
- Camp (Falkland Islands)
- Coat of arms of the Falkland Islands
- Flag of the Falkland Islands

== Fauna of the Falklands Islands ==
- Black-necked swan
- Falkland Island fox

== Geography of the Falkland Islands ==
- Warrah River
- Chartres River
- Murrell River
- Cape Meredith
- Calm Head
- MacBride Head
- Volunteer Point

=== Straits, inlets and sounds ===
- Choiseul Sound
- Engle Passage
- Falkland Sound
- King George Bay
- Byron Sound
- Gypsy Cove
- Keppel Sound

=== Islands of the Falkland Islands ===
- Barren Island (Falkland Islands)
- Beauchene Island
- Beaver Island (Falkland Islands)
- Bleaker Island
- Carcass Island
- East Falkland
- Lafonia (peninsula)
- George Island
- Golding Island
- Grand Jason Island
- Jason Islands
- Keppel Island
- Lively Island
- New Island
- Passage Islands
- Pebble Island
- Saunders Island (Falkland Islands)
- Sea Lion Island
- Speedwell Island
- Staats Island
- Steeple Jason Island
- Swan Islands
- Weddell Island
- West Falkland
- West Point Island

=== Mountains of the Falkland Islands ===
- Hornsby Mountains
- Mount Maria
- Mount Usborne
- Storm Mountain
- Jack's Mountain
- Wickham Heights

=== Landforms of the Falkland Islands ===
- Stone run

== Governors of the Falkland Islands ==
- Governor of the Falkland Islands
- List of governors of the Falkland Islands
- William Lamond Allardyce
- Roger Goldsworthy
- Nigel Haywood
- Arnold Weinholt Hodson
- Alan Huckle
- Rex Masterman Hunt
- John Middleton (administrator)
- Howard Pearce
- Nigel Phillips
- George Rennie (sculptor and politician)
- Colin Roberts
- William Cleaver Francis Robinson
- Luis Vernet

== History of the Falkland Islands ==
- History of the Falkland Islands
- Timeline of the history of the Falkland Islands
- Re-establishment of British rule on the Falklands (1833)
- Battle of the Falkland Islands
- British Nationality (Falkland Islands) Act 1983
- Operation Journeyman
- Postage stamps and postal history of the Falkland Islands
- Puerto Soledad
- 1966 Aerolineas Argentinas DC-4 hijacking

=== Falklands War ===
- Falklands War
- 1982 invasion of the Falkland Islands
- 1982 Liberation Memorial
- Argentine air forces in the Falklands War
- Argentine ground forces in the Falklands War
- Argentine naval forces in the Falklands War
  - ARA Almirante Domecq Garcia (D23)
  - ARA Almirante Irízar (Q-5)
  - ARA Bahía Buen Suceso
  - ARA General Belgrano
  - ARA Isla de los Estados
  - ARA San Luis]
  - ARA Santa Fe (S-21)
- British air services in the Falklands War
- British ground forces in the Falklands War
- British naval forces in the Falklands War
  - Atlantic Conveyor
  - HMS Antelope (F170)
  - HMS Ardent (F184)
  - HMS Cardiff (D108)
  - HMS Conqueror (S48)
  - HMS Coventry (D118)
  - HMS Endurance (1967)
  - HMS Exeter (D89)
  - HMS Glamorgan (D19)
  - HMS Glasgow (D88)
  - HMS Sheffield (D80)
- Casualties of the Battle of Bluff Cove
- Cultural impact of the Falklands War
- Escuadrón Fénix
- Events leading to the Falklands War
- USS Salish (ATA-187)
- History of South Georgia and the South Sandwich Islands
- Malvinas 2032
- No 6 mine
- Norland
- Oerlikon 35 mm twin cannon
- Operation Algeciras
- Operation Azul
- Operation Black Buck
- Operation Corporate
- Operation Keyhole
- Operation Paraquat
- Operation Purple Warrior
- Operation Rosario
- Operation Sutton
- The Falklands Play
- Weapons of the Falklands War

==== Battles of the Falklands War ====
- Battle of Goose Green
- Battle of Mount Harriet
- Battle of Mount Longdon
- Battle of Mount Tumbledown
- Battle of Two Sisters
- Battle of Wireless Ridge

==== Falklands War media ====
- Cultural impact of the Falklands War
- Harrier Attack
- Tumbledown
- Yomp (computer game)

==== Falklands War people ====
- Jorge Anaya
- Peter Carington, 6th Baron Carrington
- Tam Dalyell
- Leopoldo Galtieri
- Max Hastings
- H. Jones
- Ian John McKay
- Ewen Southby-Tailyour
- Margaret Thatcher
- 'Sharkey' Ward
- Simon Weston
- Sandy Woodward

==== Falklands War military equipment ====
===== Falklands War guided missiles =====
- Aerospatiale SS.12/AS.12

== Maps of the Falkland Islands ==
- Maps of the Falkland Islands

== Maps of the history of the Falkland Islands ==
- Maps of the Falkland Islands

== Military of the Falkland Islands ==
- Military of the Falkland Islands
- Falkland Islands Defence Force
- RAF Mount Pleasant

== Politics of the Falkland Islands ==
- Politics of the Falkland Islands
- Government House (Falkland Islands)
- Governor of the Falkland Islands
- List of governors of the Falkland Islands
- Executive Council of the Falkland Islands
- Chief Executive of the Falkland Islands
- Director of Finance of the Falkland Islands
- Legislative Assembly of the Falkland Islands
- Speaker of the Legislative Assembly of the Falkland Islands
- Legislative Council of the Falkland Islands
- Supreme Court of the Falkland Islands
- Advisory Committee on the Prerogative of Mercy
- Attorney General of the Falkland Islands

=== Elections in the Falkland Islands ===
- Elections in the Falkland Islands
- List of Falkland Islands by-elections
- 1949 Falkland Islands general election
- 1952 Falkland Islands general election
- 1956 Falkland Islands general election
- 1960 Falkland Islands general election
- 1964 Falkland Islands general election
- 1968 Falkland Islands general election
- 1971 Falkland Islands general election
- 1976 Falkland Islands general election
- 1977 Falkland Islands general election
- 1981 Falkland Islands general election
- 1985 Falkland Islands general election
- 1989 Falkland Islands general election
- 1993 Falkland Islands general election
- 1997 Falkland Islands general election
- 2001 Falkland Islands general election
- 2005 Falkland Islands general election
- 2009 Falkland Islands general election
- 2013 Falkland Islands general election
- 2017 Falkland Islands general election
- 2021 Falkland Islands general election
- Next Falkland Islands general election

=== Referendums in the Falkland Islands ===
- 1986 Falkland Islands status referendum
- 2001 Falkland Islands electoral system referendum
- 2011 Falkland Islands electoral system referendum
- 2013 Falkland Islands sovereignty referendum
- 2020 Falkland Islands electoral system referendum

== Religion in the Falkland Islands ==
- Roman Catholicism in the Falkland Islands
- Anglican Bishop for the Falklands Islands

== Settlements in the Falkland Islands ==
- List of settlements in the Falkland Islands
- List of Argentine names for the Falklands Islands
- Darwin, Falkland Islands
- Goose Green
- Port Egmont
- Port Howard
- Port Louis, Falkland Islands
- Port San Carlos
- Salvador Settlement
- San Carlos, Falkland Islands
- Stanley, Falkland Islands
- Fox Bay
- Ajax Bay
- Port Albemarle
- Walker Creek
- Johnson's Harbour
- Hoste Inlet
- Port Stephens
- Roy Cove
- Hill Cove

== Demographics of the Falkland Islands ==
- Falkland Islanders
- Origins of Falkland Islanders

== See also ==
- List of international rankings
- Lists of country-related topics
- Outline of geography
- Outline of South America
