= Bird Island, Falkland Islands =

Island of the Falkland Islands

Bird Island
- Island
- Bird Island shown within the Falkland Islands
- Coordinates: 52.17°S 60.93°W
- Country: Falkland Islands
- Island group: Falkland Islands

Area
  - Total: 1.2 km^{2} (0.46 sq mi)
- Highest elevation: 107 m (351 ft)
- Time zone: UTC−3 (FKST)
- If shown, area and population ranks are for all islands and all inhabited islands in the Falklands respectively.

Bird Island (Spanish: Isla Pájaro) is one of the Falkland Islands. It lies due south of West Falkland, near Port Stephens and Calm Head. It has been identified as an Important Bird Area (IBA) by BirdLife International.

According to Ian Strange "Such offshore islands [as Bird Island] are the remaining strongholds of a large percentage of bird life".

== Geography ==
Bird Island is located 4.5 km off the south-western coast of West Falkland and is roughly triangular in shape. The western half of the southern coast has sheer cliffs reaching at least 70 m and the plateau above slopes gently to the north and west. In the centre of the island there is a large seasonal pool to the west of a small inlet. The eastern promontory has two domed peaks reaching to at least 110 m with sheer southern cliffs of 30 m and very steep slopes in the north. Access by boat is difficult, except at the small north-east-facing inlet between the northern and eastern promontories, and the terrain is difficult to cross, with dense growth of Tussac above thick, soft peat and Tussac overhanging deep gulches.

== Wildlife ==
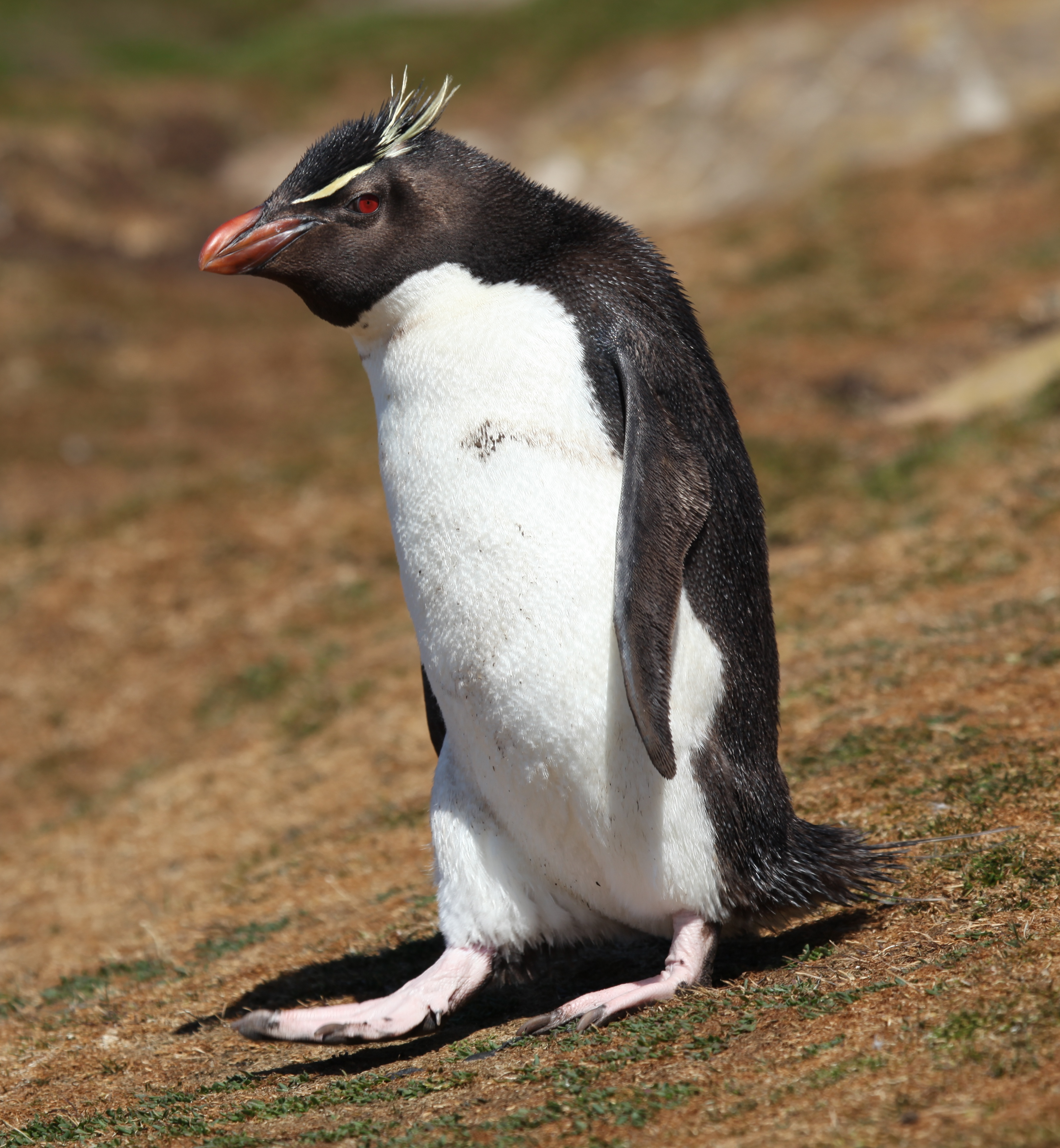
Rockhopper penguin (Eudyptes sp.) in the Falkland Islands

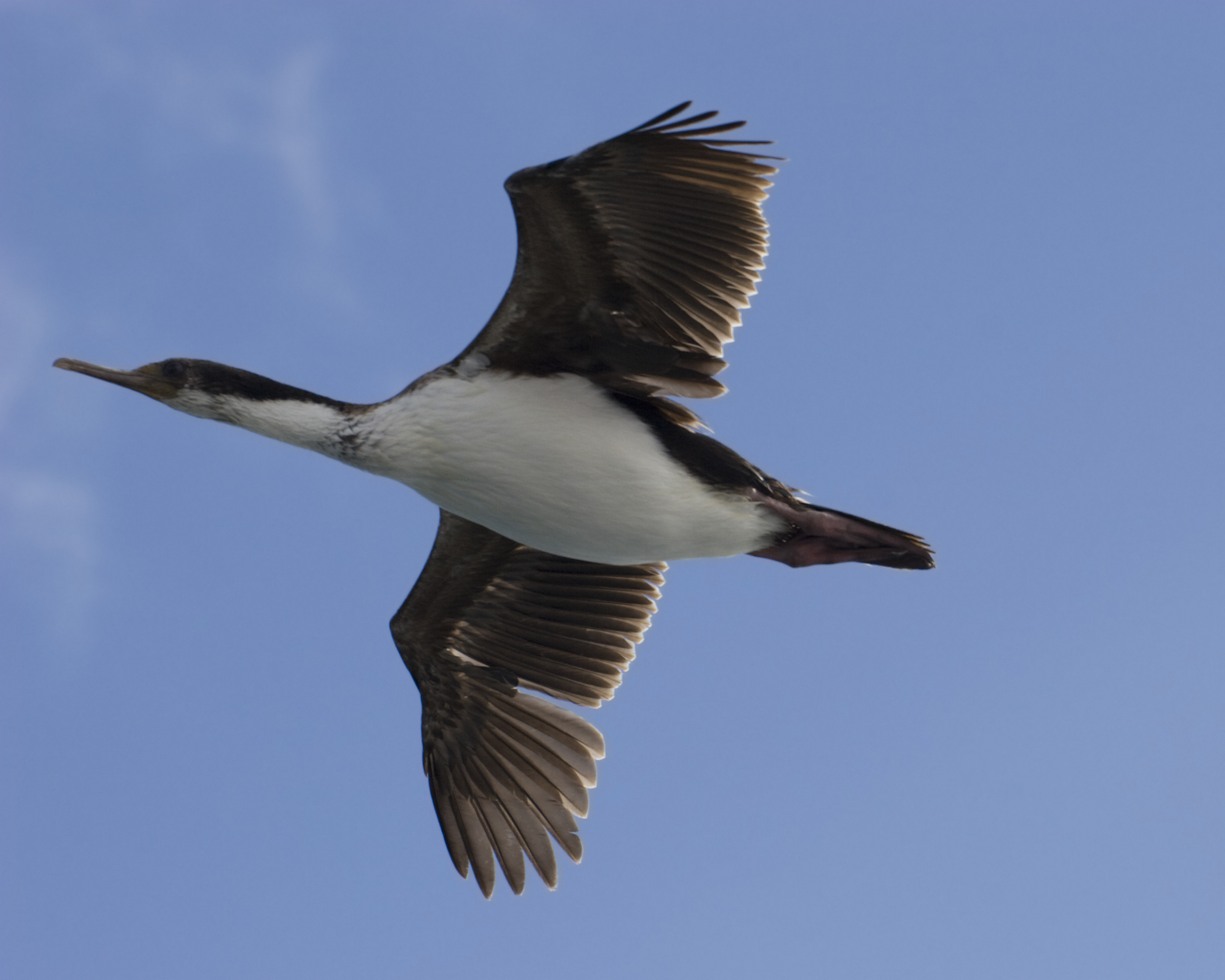
King shag (Phalacrocorax albiventer) in the Falkland Islands

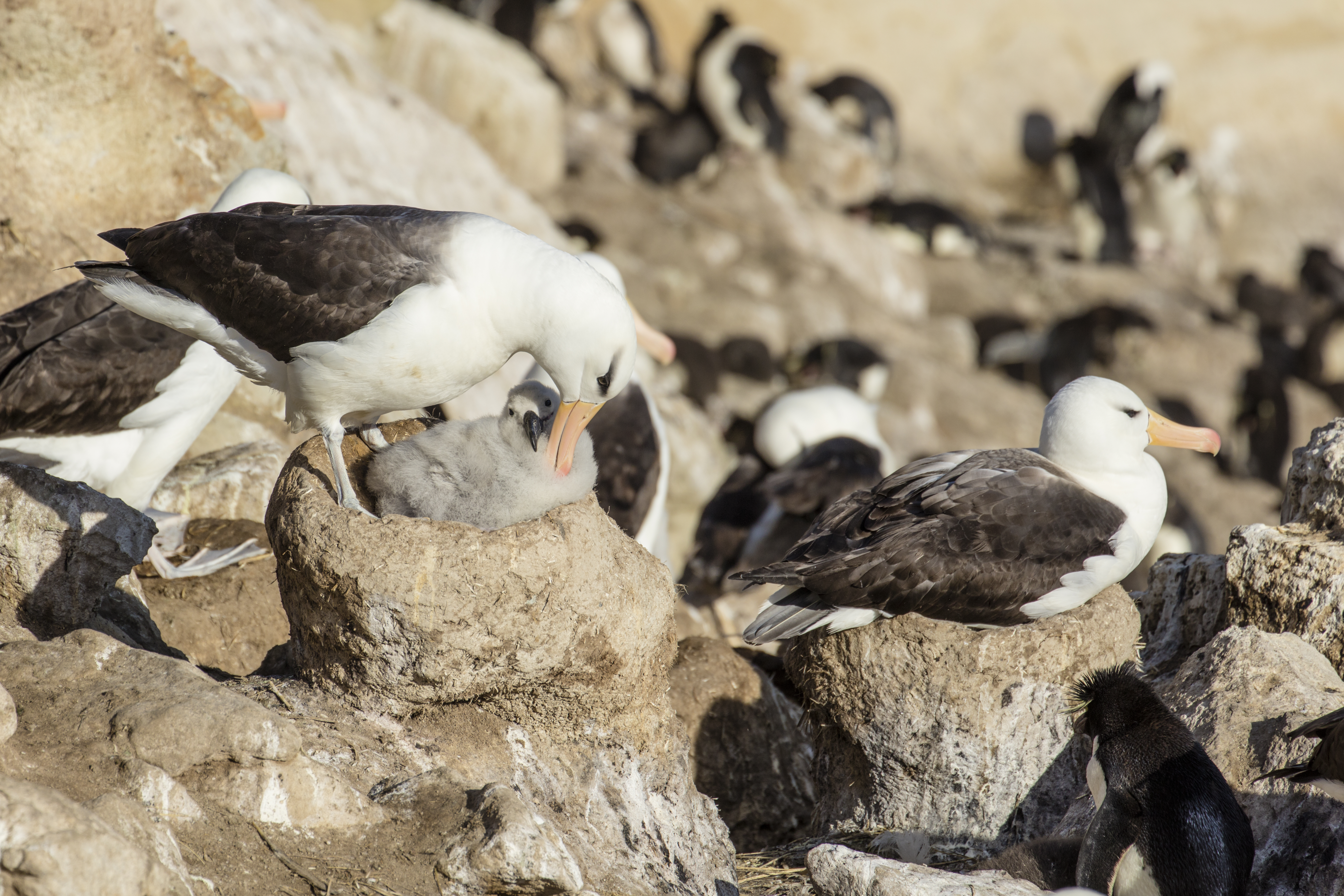
Black-browed albatross (Thalassarche melanophrys) in the Falkland Islands

Amongst the birds which breed here are rockhopper penguins, king shags, petrels and black-browed albatrosses.

The total number of species recorded on Bird Island in November 1998 was 27, of which 25 bred or were probably breeding. Macaroni penguin, ruddy-headed goose, canary-winged finch, black-throated finch and Falkland steamer duck are present but their status is uncertain or populations are too small to qualify. The congregation of seabirds on this island exceeds 10,000 breeding pairs, making the site classifiable under the A4iii criterion. Bird Island is one of the most important breeding sites for the striated caracara and it is considered that the population here is at least as dense as on any offshore island around the Falklands, possibly due to the very large population of thin-billed prions, an important prey species.

Deep Tussac cover over most of Bird Island makes it comparable to Beauchene Island for the density of burrowing petrels. Other species that should be investigated include sooty shearwater, grey-backed storm petrel, which is thought to be numerous, rock shag, imperial shag and dolphin gull. Endemic races present include the dark-faced ground-tyrant, Falkland thrush, long-tailed meadowlark and common diving petrel.
