= West Falkland (constituency) =

Constituency of the Falkland Islands (1949–1985)

- Former Falkland Islands Legislative Council constituency
- Location of West Falkland within the Falkland Islands
- Major settlements: Port Howard, Port Albemarle, Chartres, Dunnose Head, Fox Bay, Fox Bay West, Hill Cove, Port Stephens, Roy Cove

Former constituency
- Created: 1949
- Abolished: 1985
- Number of members: One
- Replaced by: Camp

West Falkland was a constituency of the Legislative Council of the Falkland Islands which was in existence from the first elections in the Falklands in 1949 until the 1985 election when the Falkland Islands Constitution came into force, abolishing the constituency. The constituency of West Falkland elected one member to the Legislative Council and consisted of the island of the same name and some neighbouring islands. West Falkland is now part of the Camp constituency.

== Members ==
| Election | Member |
|---|---|
| 1949 | Keith William Luxton |
| 1952 | Keith William Luxton |
| 1956 | Sydney Miller |
| 1960 | Lewis Arnold Charles Bedford |
| 1964 | Sydney Miller |
| 1968 | Sydney Miller |
| 1971 | Lionel Geoffrey Blake |
| 1976 | Lionel Geoffrey Blake |
| 1977 | Derek Stanley Evans |
| 1980 by-election | Lionel Geoffrey Blake |
| 1981 | Lionel Geoffrey Blake |
| 1985 | Constituency abolished. |
