= Events leading to the Falklands War =

There were many events leading to the 1982 Falklands War (Guerra de las Malvinas in Spanish) between the United Kingdom and Argentina over possession of the Falkland Islands and South Georgia.

== Background ==
The Falkland Islands had been the subject of a sovereignty dispute almost since they were first settled in 1764, between Great Britain and the later United Kingdom on one side, and successively France, Spain, and the United Provinces of the River Plate (later Argentina) on the other.

Britain made diplomatic protests when Luis Vernet was appointed Governor by the United Provinces and both Britain and the United States made diplomatic protests over the attempt to curtail rights to sealing on the islands. After Vernet seized American ships sealing in the islands and confiscated their catch, the United States dispatched a warship to the islands, resulting in the abandonment of Puerto Luis (previously known as Puerto Soledad) and the voluntary repatriation of many of the settlers. Subsequently, the United Provinces tried to re-establish the settlement at Puerto Soledad as a penal colony, but a mutiny resulted in the murder of one Governor.

Shortly after that mutiny had been quelled, in January 1833, a British naval task force arrived which was charged with the re-establishment of British rule on the islands. The British requested that the Argentine administration leave the islands, who complied with that request without a shot being fired. Contrary to popular belief, the settlers on the island were not expelled at the same time, but were encouraged by the British to remain. The islands remained continuously in British possession from then until 1982.

== Build-up ==
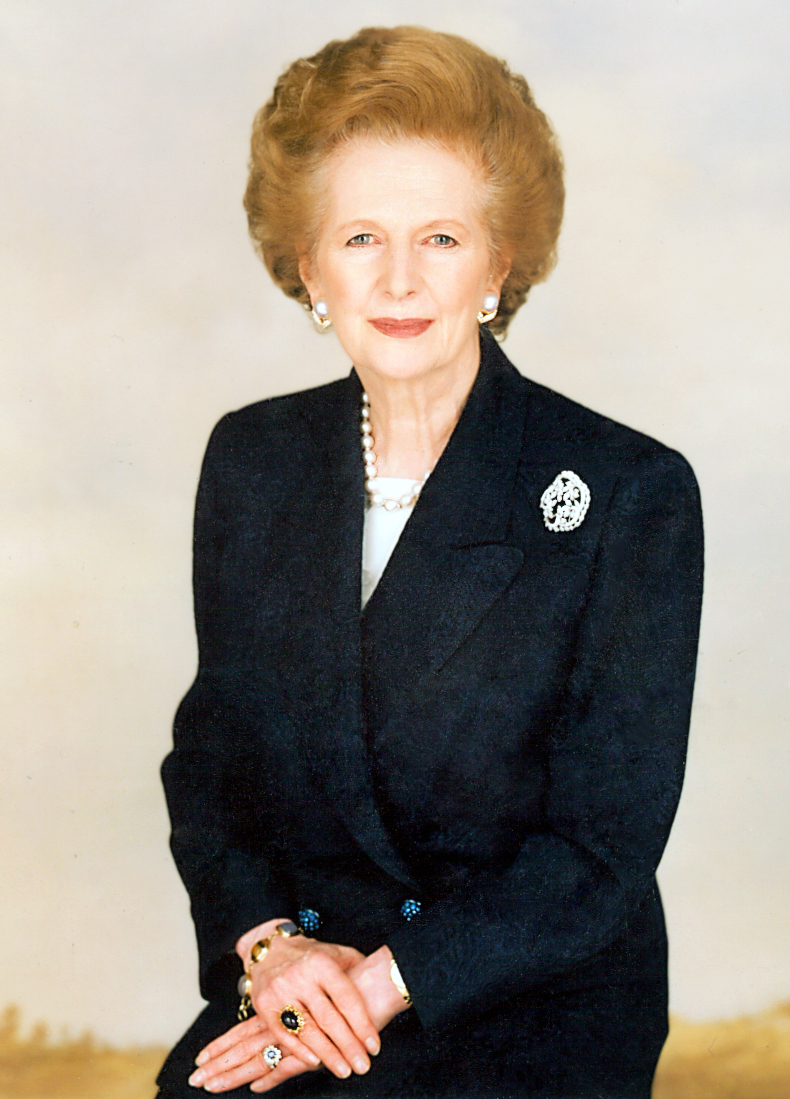
Margaret Thatcher

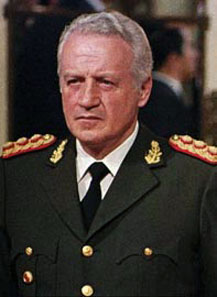
Leopoldo Galtieri

From 1976 to 1983, Argentina was under the control of a military dictatorship, and in the midst of a devastating economic crisis. The National Reorganization Process, as the junta was known, had killed thousands of Argentine citizens for their political opposition to the government. The era was known as the Dirty War.

The military staged a coup against the government of President Isabel Perón and put General Jorge Videla in power. He was succeeded by General Roberto Viola and then General Leopoldo Galtieri for a short while. Before he started the Falklands War, Galtieri was subject to growing opposition from the people. The actual rule of General Galtieri lasted eighteen months. In the course of 1981, Argentina saw inflation climb to over 600%; simultaneously, the GDP fell by 11.4%, manufacturing output by 22.9% and real wages by 19.2%. The trade unions were gaining more support for a general strike every day, and (most ominously for the dictatorship) popular opposition to the junta was growing rapidly.

President Galtieri, as head of the junta, aimed to counter public concern over economic and human rights issues by means of a speedy victory over the Falklands which would appeal to popular nationalistic sentiment. Argentine intelligence officers had been working with the Central Intelligence Agency (CIA) to help fund the Contras in Nicaragua, and the Argentine government believed it might be rewarded for this activity by non-interference on the part of the United States if it invaded the Falklands. The Argentine leadership had noticed that during the Suez Crisis in 1956, the US had objected to the British use of force, that in 1981 the UK reached agreement with the former colony Rhodesia and that the 1961 Indian Annexation of Goa was initially condemned by the international community and then accepted as a fait accompli.

Argentina exerted pressure at the United Nations by raising hints of a possible invasion, but the British either missed or ignored this threat and did not react. The Argentines assumed that the British would not use force if the islands were invaded.

According to British sources, the Argentines interpreted the failure of the British to react as a lack of interest in the Falklands due to the planned withdrawal (as part of a general reduction in size of the Royal Navy in 1981), including the last of the Antarctic Supply vessels, HMS Endurance, and by the British Nationality Act of 1981, which replaced the full British citizenship of Falkland Islanders with a more limited version.

Operation Sol in 1976 had secretly landed a force of 50 men from the Argentine military under the command of Captain César Trombetta on the unoccupied Southern Thule, which belonged to the British South Sandwich Islands, where they established the military outpost of Corbeta Uruguay. This led to a formal protest from the United Kingdom, and an effort to resolve the issue through diplomatic rather than military means. (The United Kingdom's ultimate response was Operation Journeyman, an armed force commanded by Captain Hugh Balfour, the commanding officer of the frigate HMS Phoebe, and accompanied by the nuclear submarine HMS Dreadnought, the frigate HMS Alacrity, and two auxiliaries, RFA Resurgent and RFA Olwen in support.)

Reports from the Joint Intelligence Committee (JIC) in 1977, 1979 and 1981 suggested that "as long as Argentina calculated that the British Government were prepared to negotiate seriously on sovereignty, it was unlikely to resort to force." However, if "... negotiations broke down, or if Argentina concluded from them that there was no prospect of real progress towards a negotiated transfer of sovereignty, there would be a high risk of its then resorting to more forceful measures, including direct military action."

== Preparation ==
=== First moves ===
At a lunch between Admiral Jorge Isaac Anaya (another member of the junta) and General Leopoldo Fortunato Galtieri on 9 December 1981, in the main army barracks at Campo de Mayo, the two discussed how and when to overthrow President Roberto Viola. Anaya offered the navy's support on the understanding that the navy would be allowed to occupy the Falkland Islands and South Georgia. Galtieri appears to have hoped that public opinion would reward a successful occupation by affording him power for at least ten years. They believed that the flying of the Argentine flag in Port Stanley on the 150th anniversary of Britain's "illegal usurpation of Las Malvinas" would lead to a neo-Perónist era of national pride.

On Tuesday 15 December, Anaya flew from Buenos Aires to the main Argentine naval base at Puerto Belgrano. He travelled there to install Vice-Admiral Juan Lombardo officially as the new Chief of Naval Operations. After the ceremony, Anaya surprised Lombardo by telling him to prepare a plan for the occupation of the Falkland Islands. Lombardo later told the author Martin Middlebrook in an interview that Anaya told him to "take them but not necessarily to keep them". The conversation between Anaya and Lombardo was short and concluded with Anaya stressing the need for absolute secrecy.

Shortly after this initial order, Lombardo flew to Buenos Aires to ask Anaya for clarification of his orders. Lombardo recalled later:

I set out my questions in a handwritten document to make sure they were on the record, but no copies were made. I asked these questions: Was the operation to be purely naval, or joint with other services? Was the intention to take and keep the islands, or take them and then hand them over to someone else, and, if so, would this be an Argentine force or a world force, that is, the United Nations. Could he guarantee that the secret nature of the planning be maintained? These were the answers I was given: It was to be a joint operation, but nobody else had yet been informed. I didn't know at the time whether Galtieri and [sic] Lami Dozo were aware of Admiral Anaya's orders to me, but it was confirmed a few days later that they were. It was to plan a take-over; but not to prepare the defence of the islands afterwards. About secrecy, he said that I would only be working with three other Admirals – Allara, Busser of the Marines and Garcia Bol of the Naval Air Arm; these were all near me at Puerto Belgrano. I started talks with those three, and they all asked the same or similar questions.

So I went back to Buenos Aires to insist that, if the operation was to be joint, co-operation with the other services would be essential. Anaya agreed that General Garcia of the Army was in mind but had not yet been informed. He repeated that it was a Navy task to take over the Malvinas; what followed was for the junta to decide. They did not think there would be any military reaction from the British.

The Air Force's Brigadier Basilio Lami Dozo was not informed of the decision before 29 December and even Foreign Minister Costa Méndez was unaware of the planning while he prepared his diplomatic initiative in January 1982.

=== Planning ===
Detailed planning began in early January 1982. It was headed by Vice Admiral Juan José Lombardo (Commander-in-Chief Fleet) and included General Osvald Garcia (commander of the Fifth Army Corps) and Brigadier Sigfrido Plessel, (member of the Air Force Staff). The operation would be an amphibious landing of 3,000 troops en masse to minimise bloodshed. The contingent of Royal Marines, British civil service officials and the more anti-Argentine among the Falklanders would be deported and the bulk of the invasion force would return to their bases within 48 hours. A military governor and a gendarmerie of about 500 would be left to keep the Falklanders in line. Anaya's draft planned to replace the entire island population with Argentine settlers, but Lombardo believed that such a step would outrage the international community. Instead the Falklanders should be offered financial compensation if they wished to emigrate.

Commissioned by the British, an Argentine firm had constructed a temporary runway near Stanley in advance of the building of a main runway at Stanley airport. The military Líneas Aéreas del Estado (LADE) airline flew regularly to the Falkland Islands. LADE was represented by Vice-Commodore Hector Gilobert in Port Stanley and he had been gathering intelligence for four years. The cargo ship ARA Isla de los Estados was hired for commercial purposes by the island administration, and her captain Capaglio had detailed information on the Falkland coast, beaches and inner waters.

In an atmosphere of arms selling (for example, the Iran-Iraq war was occurring, with both countries buying massive amounts of arms) the United Kingdom was very forthcoming to the Argentine naval attaché in London, Rear-Admiral Walter Allara. He was invited on board HMS Invincible and had conversations with British naval personnel about the shortcomings of the Royal Navy.

In January 1982, diplomatic talks over sovereignty ceased. Although it is often thought that the Falklands invasion was a long-planned action, it became clear after the war that the subsequent defence of the islands had been largely improvised; for example, sea mines were not deployed at strategic landing locations, and a large part of the infantry forces sent to the Falklands consisted of the current intake of conscripts, who had only begun their training in January/February of that year. Arguments that the war was a last-minute decision are bolstered by the fact that the Argentine Navy would have received, at the end of the year, additional French Exocet airborne anti-ship missiles, Super Étendards (French fighter aircraft capable of carrying the Exocet) and new ships being built in West Germany.

=== Argentine intentions ===
The Argentine Navy possessed modern British-built Type 42 air-defence destroyers of the type forming the bulk of the British Task Force's anti-air umbrella. Training attacks on these revealed that over half of Argentine aircraft might be lost in the process of destroying only a few British warships if they attacked at the medium to high altitudes at which the Sea Dart missile was designed to engage; hence the Argentine Air Force's employment of low-level stand-off Exocet attacks in blue-water combat, and over-land approaches when in the littoral.

The overall lack of readiness for the Falklands adventure was likely to have been due to the invasion being a last-minute decision taken as a consequence of the South Georgia crisis (see below). Furthermore, for several years, Argentina had been on the brink of war with Chile. Argentina's military strategists feared that Chile would take advantage of the Falklands crisis and attempt to seize part of Argentine Patagonia. In 2009 Basilio Lami Dozo, the commander-in-chief of the Argentine Air Force during the war, disclosed that Leopoldo Galtieri announced to him that Chile would be the next invasion target.

Consequently, a significant part of Argentina's limited forces and equipment were kept on the mainland – and during the war, Chile, perhaps suspecting an Argentine invasion, did indeed deploy forces in border regions in what looked like mobilization for a possible invasion (it is still unclear whether this was defensive, offensive or merely a diversion prompted by its British allies).

== Landings on South Georgia ==
In 1980, Admiral Edgardo Otero (formerly the notorious commander of the Navy Petty-Officers School of Mechanics, where hundreds of the 'disappeared' were tortured and executed) was the head of the navy's Antarctic operations and sought to repeat Operation Sol in South Georgia by establishing a military base (Operation Alpha). Admiral Lombardo feared that Operation Alpha would jeopardise the secret preparations for the Falkland landings, but Admiral Otero had close links to Admiral Anaya who approved Operation Alpha despite promising Admiral Lombardo he would cancel the operation.

The Argentine entrepreneur Constantino Davidoff had a two-year-old contract regarding scrapping an old whaling station on South Georgia. In December 1981, he was transported by the icebreaker ARA Almirante Irizar, commanded by Captain Trombetta, to South Georgia for an initial survey of the work. The party was landed without the customary call to the British Antarctic Survey (BAS) base at Grytviken, which led to formal diplomatic protests by the British Government.

Davidoff personally called the British Embassy in Buenos Aires to apologise, and promised that his men would follow the correct protocols on landing in future. He received permission to continue with his venture, and on 11 March the naval transport ARA Bahía Buen Suceso set sail, carrying Davidoff's party of scrap workers. The party was, however, infiltrated by Argentine marines posing as civilian scientists. Operation Alpha had begun.

Arriving on 19 March, the party failed once again to follow the correct protocol and proceeded directly to Leith Harbour. The BAS party sent to investigate found that the Argentinian scrap metal workers had established a camp, defaced British signs, broken into the BAS hut and removed emergency rations, and had shot reindeer in contravention of local conservancy measures (landing with firearms without permission was of itself illegal). The BAS party also reported a number of men in military uniform and that the Argentine flag had been raised.

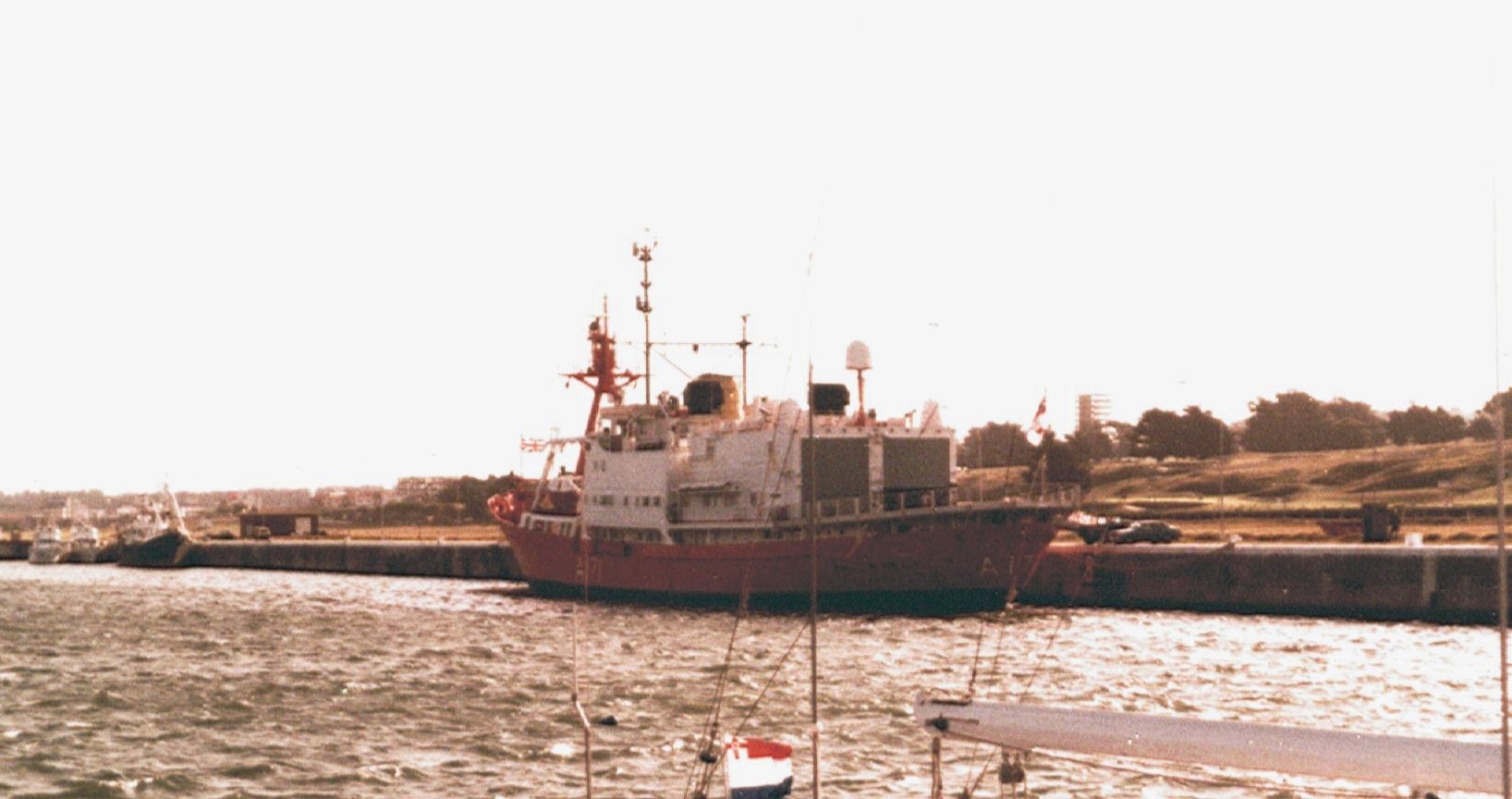
HMS Endurance at Mar del Plata naval base, during her trip to the Falklands in February 1982

A series of diplomatic exchanges then took place. The Falkland Islands Governor and subsequently the Foreign Office passed a message back to the BAS team for passing to the captain of the ARA Bahia Buen Suceso. This was to the effect that the Argentine flag must be taken down and that they must report to the British administrator (Mr Stephen Martin, commander of the British Antarctic Survey Base) at Grytviken, to have their passports stamped (which they refused to do as it would acknowledge British sovereignty over the islands). Although the flag was lowered and the Bahía Buen Suceso departed, a party of men were left behind. On 21 March, HMS Endurance set sail with a party of 22 Royal Marines to expel the men who remained at Leith, but to avoid further tensions, the Foreign and Commonwealth Office (FCO) ordered Endurance to hold off.

Taking advantage of the British pause, the Argentine Junta then ordered the ARA Bahía Paraíso to land a party of Buzos Tacticos (special forces) led by Lieutenant Alfredo Astiz ("the blond angel of death"). Rather than force a confrontation, the Royal Marines were ordered to set up an observation post to monitor the situation at Leith. The full party of Royal Marines was not landed until 31 March when it became apparent that Argentine forces intended to seize the Falkland Islands. The Grytviken Base was actually assaulted the day after the Falklands, since bad weather prevented an attack on the same day.

== Failed diplomacy ==
During the conflict, there were no formal diplomatic relations between the United Kingdom and Argentina, so negotiations were carried out in a rather indirect way, via third parties who spoke with one then with the other belligerent ("shuttle diplomacy"). The Secretary-General of the United Nations, Javier Pérez de Cuéllar of Peru, announced that his efforts in favour of peace were futile.

Although Peru (which represented Argentina's diplomatic interests in Britain) and Switzerland (which represented Britain's diplomatic interests in Argentina) exerted great diplomatic pressure to avoid war, they were unable to resolve the conflict, and a peace plan proposed by Peruvian president Fernando Belaúnde Terry on 1 May, was rejected by Argentina after the sinking of the cruiser ARA Belgrano on 2 May.

== Invasion ==
The British Government warned Rex Hunt, the Governor of the Falkland Islands, of a possible Argentine invasion on 1 April. Hunt then organised a defence, and gave military command to Major Mike Norman RM, who managed to muster a small force of Royal Marines. The Argentine Lieutenant-Commander in charge of the invasion, Guillermo Sanchez-Sabarots, landed his special forces at Mullet Creek.

He proceeded to attack the buildings in and around Port Stanley, including Government House and the Moody Brook Barracks until the Falkland Islands government at Government House surrendered on 2 April. One Argentine was killed in the main invasion; a further three Argentines died in the fighting to take control of South Georgia.

== Task force ==
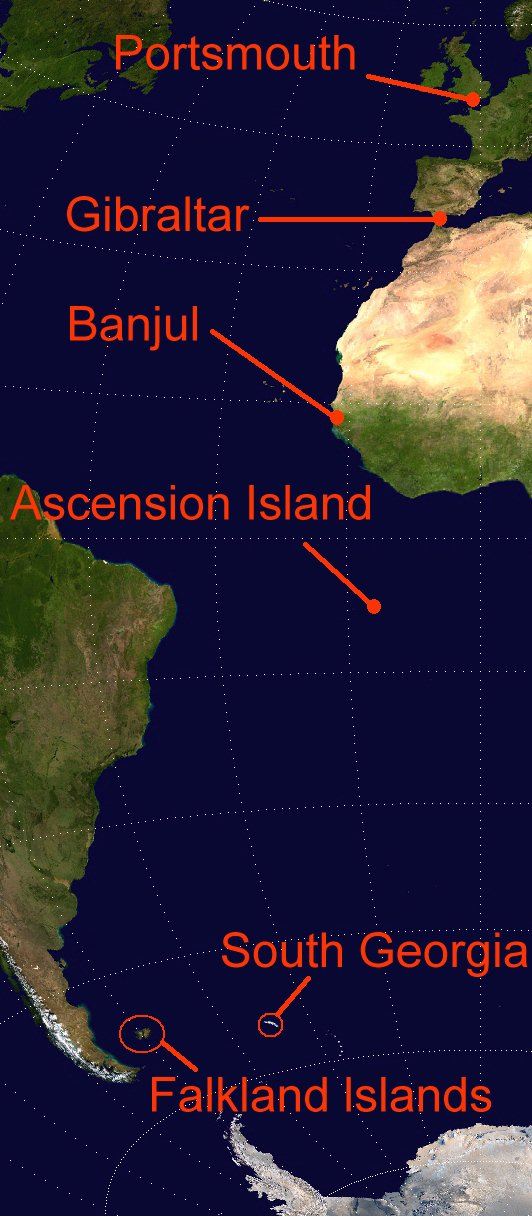
The key locations in the Task Force's logistics chain

The British were quick to organise diplomatic pressure against Argentina. Because of the long distance to the Falklands, Britain had to rely on a naval task force for military action. The overall naval force was commanded by the Commander-in-Chief Fleet, Admiral Sir John Fieldhouse, who was designated Commander Task Force 317, and had three to four subordinate task groups, depending on the stage of the war. Rear Admiral John “Sandy” Woodward’s Task Group 317.8 was centred around the aircraft carriers HMS Hermes and the newly commissioned HMS Invincible carrying only 20 Fleet Air Arm (FAA) Sea Harriers between them for defence against the combined Argentinian air force and naval air arm. The task force would have to be self-reliant and able to project its force across the littoral area of the Islands.

A second component was the Amphibious Group, Task Group 317.0, commanded by Commodore Michael Clapp RN. The embarked force, the Landing Group or Task Group 317.1, comprised 3 Commando Brigade, Royal Marines (including units attached from the British Army's Parachute Regiment and a number of units under the Royal Armoured Corps cap badge (The Blues and Royals)), under the command of Brigadier Julian Thompson RM to bring it up to its wartime strength. Most of this force was aboard the hastily commandeered cruise liner Canberra.

A third was Submarine Group (TG 320.9) of three to four submarines under Flag Officer Submarines. The UK declared a 'total exclusion zone' of 200 nmi (370 km) around the Falkland Islands before commencing operations, excluding all nations' vessels.

Throughout the operation, 43 British merchant ships (ships taken up from trade, or STUFT), served with or supplied the task force. Cargo vessels and tankers for fuel and water formed an 8,000-mile (13,000 km) logistics chain between Britain and the South Atlantic.

During the journey and up to the war beginning on 1 May, the Task Force was shadowed by Boeing 707 aircraft of the Argentine Air Force. One of these flights was intercepted outside the exclusion zone by a Sea Harrier, but the unarmed 707 was not attacked because diplomatic moves were still in progress and the British had not yet decided to commit themselves to war.

Andrew Mountbatten Windsor, then second in line to the British throne, served as a Sea King helicopter co-pilot for No.820 Naval Air Squadron on HMS Invincible during the war, flying antisubmarine and anti-surface patrols. His helicopter also acted as an improvised airborne early warning platform, helped in casualty evacuation, transport and search and rescue.

The British called their counter-invasion Operation Corporate. When the task force sailed from Britain, the American news magazine Newsweek cover headline proclaimed "The Empire Strikes Back", which was the name of a recent Star Wars film, a humorous reference to the old British Empire.

== Public opinion ==
The public mood in the United Kingdom was to support an attempt to reclaim the islands. International opinion was divided. To some, Britain was a former colonial power seeking to reclaim a lost colony from a local power, and this was a message that the Argentines initially used to garner support (this was the prevailing international opinion in which India annexed Goa in 1961; see also decolonization). Others supported Britain under the premise that it was a stable democracy invaded by a military dictatorship, along with the concept of the self-determination of the islanders, who wished to remain British. Whilst remaining diplomatically neutral, most European countries, members of the Commonwealth, and eventually the United States, supported Britain.

In nearby Uruguay, traditionally a brother country of Argentina, public mood was supportive of the Argentine people. Nevertheless, its civic-military dictatorship, with foreign relations led by Estanislao Valdés Otero, was conscious of the dangers of entering a war, so officially the country remained neutral.

== The United Nations ==
British diplomacy centred on arguing that the Falkland Islanders were entitled to use the United Nations (UN) principle of self-determination and on showing a willingness to compromise. The UN Secretary-General said that he was amazed at the compromise that the British had offered. Nevertheless, Argentina rejected it, the Junta being encouraged by massive popular support for the invasion at home and thus unable to backtrack; they based their arguments on rights to territory based on actions before 1945 and the creation of the UN.

On 3 April, the UN Security Council passed Resolution 502, calling for the withdrawal of Argentine troops from the islands and the cessation of hostilities. On 10 April, the European Community approved trade sanctions against Argentina. President Ronald Reagan and the United States’ administration did not issue direct diplomatic condemnations, instead providing intelligence support to the British armed forces.

== Shuttle diplomacy and US involvement ==
At first glance, it appeared that the US had military treaty obligations to both parties in the war, bound to the UK as a member of NATO and to Argentina by the Inter-American Treaty of Reciprocal Assistance (the "Rio Pact"). However, the North Atlantic Treaty only obliges the signatories to give support if the attack occurs in Europe or North America north of the Tropic of Cancer, and the Rio Pact only obliges the US to intervene if one of the adherents to the treaty is attacked—the UK never attacked Argentina.

In March, Secretary of State Alexander Haig, directed the US Ambassador to Argentina Harry W. Shlaudeman, to warn the Argentine government away from any invasion. President Reagan requested assurances from Galtieri against an invasion and offered the services of his Vice-President, George H. W. Bush, as mediator, but was refused.

In fact, the Reagan Administration was sharply divided on the issue. Meeting on 5 April, Haig and Assistant Secretary of State for Political Affairs Lawrence Eagleburger favoured backing Britain, concerned that equivocation would undermine the NATO alliance. Assistant Secretary of State for Inter-American Affairs Thomas Enders, however, feared that supporting Britain would undermine US anti-communist efforts in Latin America. He received the firm backing of United States Ambassadors to the UN Ambassador Jeane Kirkpatrick, Haig's nominal subordinate and political rival. Kirkpatrick was guest of honour at a dinner held by the Argentine ambassador to the United States, on the day that the Argentine armed forces landed on the islands.

The White House continued its neutrality; Reagan famously declared at the time that he could not understand why two allies were arguing over "that little ice-cold bunch of land down there". But he assented to Haig and Secretary of Defense Caspar Weinberger's position. Haig briefly (8–30 April) headed a "shuttle diplomacy" mission between London and Buenos Aires. According to a BBC documentary titled "The Falklands War and the White House", Caspar Weinberger's Department of Defense began a number of non-public actions to support and supply the British military while Haig's shuttle diplomacy was still ongoing. Haig's message to the Argentines was that the British would indeed fight, and that the US would then support Britain, but at the time he was not aware that America was already providing support.

== The US officially comes down on the side of the British ==
At the end of the month, Reagan blamed Argentina for the failure of the mediation, declared US support for Britain, and announced the imposition of economic sanctions against Argentina.

In a notorious episode in June, US ambassador to the United Nations Jeane Kirkpatrick cast a second veto of a Security Council resolution calling for an immediate cease-fire, then announced minutes later that she had received instructions to abstain from voting. The situation was blamed on a delay in communications, but it was perceived by many to be part of an ongoing power struggle between Haig and Kirkpatrick.

Galtieri and a fair proportion of his government thought that the UK would not react. Margaret Thatcher declared that the democratic rights of the Falkland Islanders had been assaulted and would not surrender the islands to the Argentinian "jackboot". This stance was aided, at least domestically, by the mostly supportive British press.

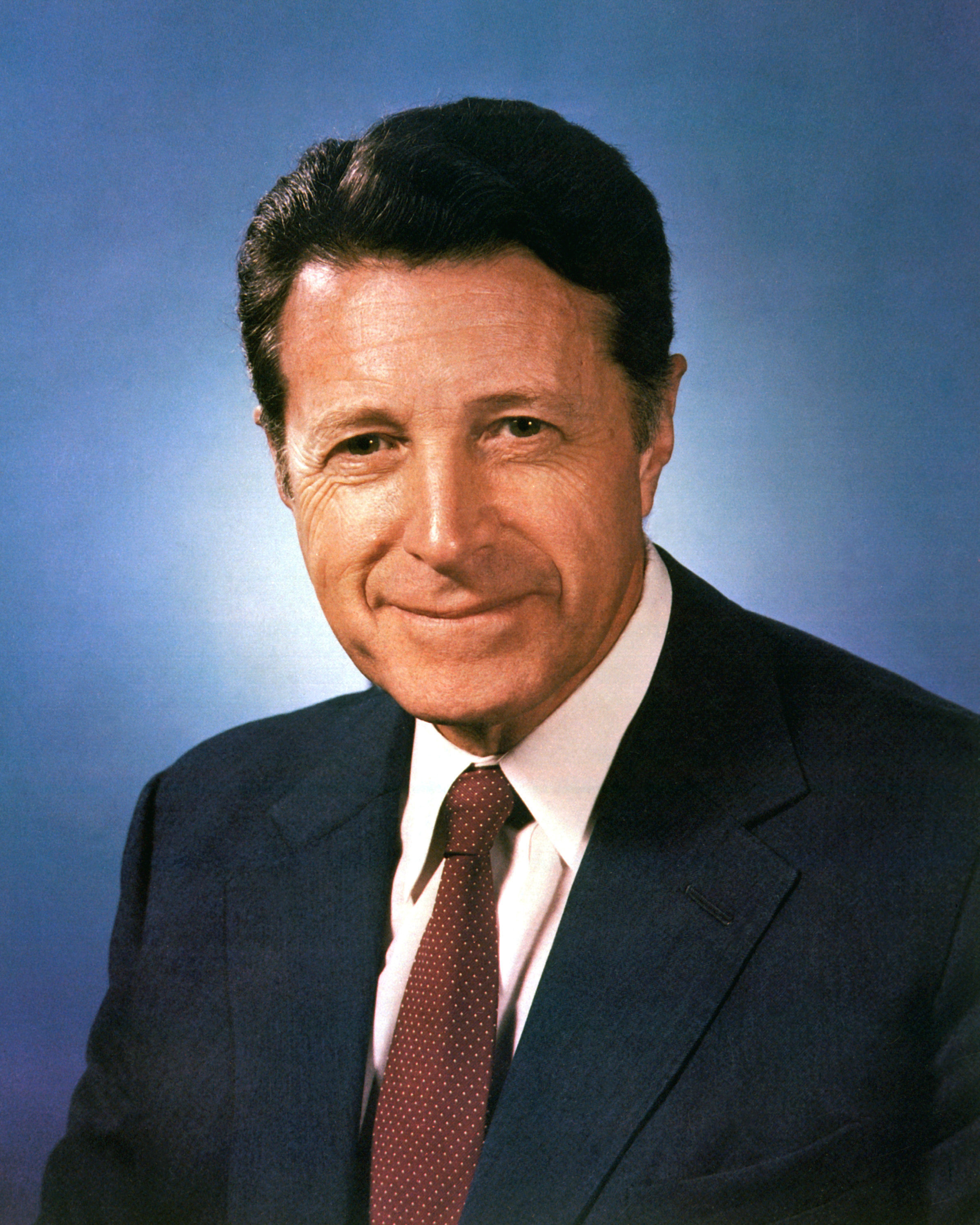
Caspar Weinberger, United States Secretary of Defense between 1981 and 1987

The Argentine junta felt that the United States would, even in a worst-case scenario, remain completely neutral in the conflict (based upon the support that Argentina had given to the Reagan administration in Central America, training Contras). This assumption underestimated the reality of the US-UK special relationship.

To some extent, the Argentine military junta was misled by its own opinion of democracies as being weak, inefficient talking-shops, afraid of taking risks. Indeed, in Britain there was much debate about the rights and wrongs of war. However, regardless of their own policies and opinions, opposition parties firmly backed the government during the crisis, in order to present a single united front.

An American fear of the perceived threat of the Soviet Union and the spread of communism, along with the certainty that Britain could handle the matter on its own, may have influenced the US to take a position of non-interference (the Soviet-Afghan War was now in its second year; the US had also relatively recently lost Vietnam and its surrounding countries to communism). During the Cold War, with the performance of forces being watched closely by the Soviet Union, it was considered preferable for the UK to handle without assistance a conflict within its capabilities.

American non-interference was vital to the US-British relationship. Ascension Island, a British possession, was vital to the long term supply of the Task Force South; however, the airbase stationed on it was run and operated by the US. The American commander of the base was ordered to assist the British in any way and for a brief period Ascension Air Field was one of the busiest airports in the world.

The most important NATO contributions were intelligence information and the rescheduled supply of the latest model of AIM-9L Sidewinder all-aspect infra-red seeking missiles, which allowed existing British stocks to be employed.

Margaret Thatcher stated that "without the Harrier jets and their immense manoeuvrability, equipped as they were with the latest version of the Sidewinder missile, supplied to us by US Secretary of Defense Caspar Weinberger, we could never have got back the Falklands." This is not only politically but militarily questionable, however, as all the Fleet Air Arm Sidewinder engagements proved to be from the rear.

In early May, Caspar Weinberger offered the use of an American aircraft carrier. This seemingly extremely generous offer was seen by some as vital: it was noted by Rear Admiral Woodward that the loss of Invincible would have been a severe setback, but the loss of Hermes would have meant an end to the whole operation. Weinberger admitted that there would have been many problems if a request had ever been made. Foremost, it would have meant US personnel becoming directly involved in the conflict, as training British forces to crew the vessel would have taken years.

Both Weinberger and Reagan were later awarded the British honour of Knight Commander of the Order of the British Empire (KBE). American critics of the US role claimed that, by failing to side with Argentina, the US violated its own Monroe Doctrine.

In September 2001, the President of Mexico, Vicente Fox, cited the conflict as proof of the failure of the Inter-American Treaty of Reciprocal Assistance since the treaty provides for mutual defence. However, in this conflict, Argentina was the aggressor.

== Soviet non-involvement ==
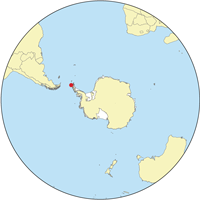
Location of the Soviet Bellingshausen Station in the South Shetlands, relative to the Falkland Islands, South Georgia and Argentina

In general, the Soviet Union stayed aloof from the situation. Both NATO member UK and the proactively anti-Communist regime in Argentina at the time were enemies of the USSR.

The USSR maintained a number of Antarctic bases, some not far from the area of conflict, such as Bellingshausen Station in the South Shetlands, an area claimed by both Argentina and the UK. The USSR had opened a new Antarctic base two years before — Russkaya Station — albeit on the other side of Antarctica. Warsaw Pact member Poland also operated the Henryk Arctowski base not far from Bellinghausen. In addition, the USSR had a number of fishing boats and "research vessels" in the region which were "multipurpose".

Hugh Bicheno continues that after Argentina, the UK and the USA:

"There was a fourth party involved — the Soviet electronic intelligence ships that maintained constant surveillance of the [British] task force. US goodwill did not extend to giving the Soviets insight into NSA eavesdropping capability, or a windfall mass of encrypted traffic for their super-computers to play with."

== European support ==
The European Community, of which the United Kingdom was a member, fully supported the UK's position and opposed the Argentinian invasion of the Falklands; the community also supported the United Nations Resolution requesting that Argentina withdraw from the islands. When Argentina refused, the community announced sanctions against Argentina. Today, the present European Union recognises the UK's sovereignty as the only legitimate claim and this is recognised in the Treaty of Lisbon, with all member states (apart from Spain which is neutral), individually recognising it.

=== French involvement ===
The President of France, François Mitterrand, gave full support to the UK in the Falklands war. Sir John Nott, the British Secretary of State for Defence during the conflict, has acknowledged in his memoirs that "in so many ways Mitterrand and the French were our greatest allies".

A large part of Argentina's military equipment was French-made, so French support was crucial. Sir John has revealed that France provided Mirage and Etendard aircraft, identical to the ones that the country had supplied to Argentina, for British pilots to train against. It is also disclosed in Sir John's memoirs that France provided intelligence to help fight the Exocet missiles that they had sold to Argentina, including details of special electronic countermeasures that at the time were only known to the French armed forces. In her memoirs, Margaret Thatcher says of Mitterrand that "I never forgot the debt we owed him for his personal support...throughout the Falklands Crisis". As France had recently sold Super Etendard aircraft and Exocet missiles to the Argentine Navy, there was still a French team in Argentina helping to fit out the Exocets and aircraft for Argentine use at the beginning of the war. Argentina claims that the team left for France soon after 2 April invasion, but according to James Corum, the French team apparently continued to assist the Argentines throughout the war in spite of the NATO embargo and official French government policy.

== Latin American involvement ==
Argentina received military assistance only from Peru – despite receiving cursory support from the Organisation of American States in a resolution supporting Argentina's sovereignty and deploring European Community sanctions (with Chile, Colombia, Trinidad and Tobago, and the United States attending but abstaining), and Peruvian President Belaunde announced that his country was "ready to support Argentina with all the resources it needed." This came in the form of aircraft supplies, such as long range air fuel (drop) tanks and spare parts.

Cuba and Bolivia offered ground troops, but their offers were seen as political posturing and not accepted. At this point in time, Cuba was also heavily involved in the war in Angola across the South Atlantic, and had 36,000 troops there.

K. J. Holsti presents a different sight of the South American dilemma:

"While South American governments (except Chile and Colombia) publicly supported Argentina in its conflict with Great Britain, in private many governments were pleased with the outcome of the war. Argentina's bellicosity against Chile over the Beagle Channel problem ... [its] foreign intervention ([in] Bolivia and Nicaragua) ... and [its] propounded geopolitical doctrines that were seen in other countries as threatening to them."

=== Chilean involvement ===
Neighbouring Chile, under Augusto Pinochet's regime, became one of the major Latin American countries (the other being Colombia), to support Britain (and then only indirectly) by providing a military and naval diversion. In 1978 Argentina initiated Operation Soberania in order to invade the islands around Cape Horn, but stopped the operation a few hours later for military and political reasons.

The Argentine government planned to seize the disputed Beagle Channel islands after the occupation of the Falklands. Basilio Lami Dozo disclosed that Leopoldo Galtieri announced to him, "Let [Chile] take note of what we’re doing now, because they will be next." Also Óscar Camilión, the last Argentine Foreign Minister before the war (29 March 1981 to 11 December 1981) stated that "The military planning was, after the solution of the Falklands case, to invade the disputed islands in the Beagle. That was the determination of the Argentine Navy."

Such preparations were made public. On 2 June 1982 an article was published in the Buenos Aires newspaper La Prensa concerning Manfred Schönfeld's answer to the question as to what to do after the expected Argentine victory in the Falklands : "The war will not be finished for us, because after the defeat of our enemies in the Falklands, they must be blown away from South Georgia, the South Sandwich Islands, and all Argentine Austral archipelagos."

This intention was probably known by the Chilean government that provided the United Kingdom with 'limited, but significant information'.

In her book Statecraft, Margaret Thatcher claims that General Pinochet gave Britain "vital" support during the war, most notably in intelligence, which saved British lives. Thatcher claims that the Chilean Air Force often provided Britain with early warning of impending Argentine Air Force attacks. When, at one point, the Chilean long-range radar was switched off for 24 hours for maintenance work, the Argentinian Air Force was able to bomb the Royal Navy ships Sir Galahad and Sir Tristram, causing many casualties. The Chilean Connection is described in detail by Sir Lawrence Freedman in his book The Official History of the Falklands Campaign.

=== Colombian support ===
Although retaining positive relations with Argentina, Colombia sided with the United Kingdom. At the Organisation of American States' resolution supporting Argentina's claim, it cast an abstaining vote, along with fellow American countries Chile, Trinidad and Tobago and the United States.

== Commonwealth support ==
The Commonwealth of Nations, of which the United Kingdom is also a member, condemned the invasion of the Falklands and publicly supported the UK, which they recognised as the rightful owner of the islands. Of the Commonwealth nations, New Zealand made available the frigates HMNZS Canterbury and HMNZS Waikato as replacements for British ships in the Indian Ocean, freeing British vessels for deployment to the Falklands. In addition, New Zealand and South Africa severed diplomatic relations with Argentina. Australia and New Zealand imposed economic sanctions against Argentina.
