= Argentina–Cuba relations =

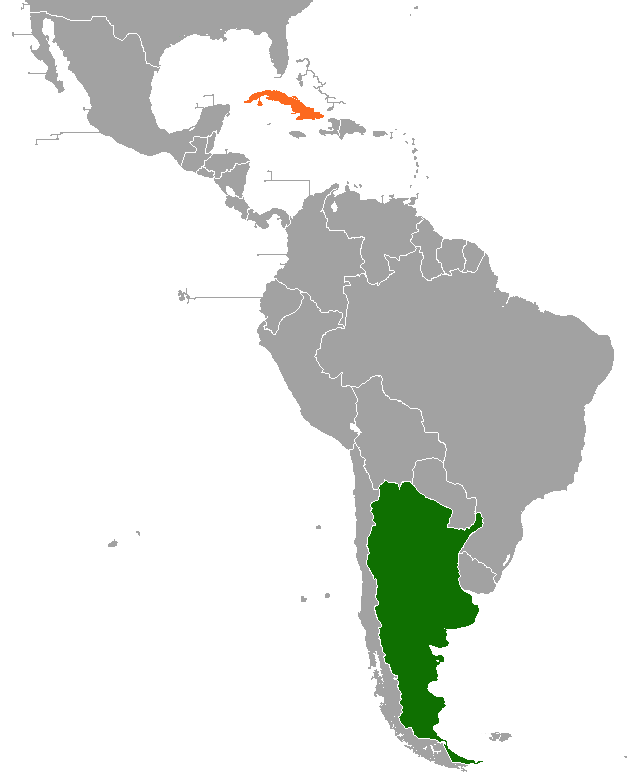

- Argentina: Cuba

Argentina–Cuba relations are the historical ties between the Argentine Republic and the Republic of Cuba that have existed for over a century. Argentina has an embassy in Havana, while Cuba has an embassy in Buenos Aires. Both nations are members of the Community of Latin American and Caribbean States, Latin American Integration Association, Organization of American States, Organization of Ibero-American States and the United Nations.

== History ==
Argentina and Cuba share a common history in the fact that both nations were once part of the Spanish Empire. In 1816, Argentina obtained its independence and in 1902, Cuba obtained its independence after the Spanish–American War. On 12 May 1909, Argentina and Cuba officially established diplomatic relations. Initially, relations were limited between both nations due to their geographic distances.

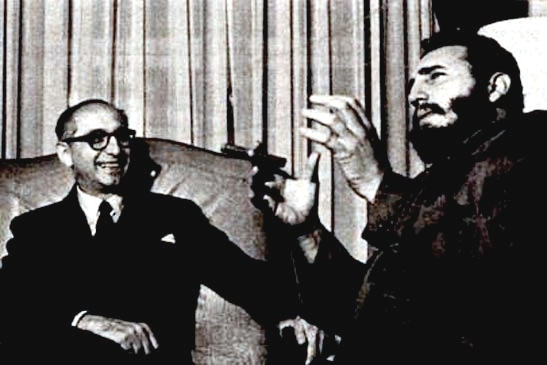
Argentine President Arturo Frondizi meeting with Cuban President Fidel Castro in Buenos Aires, 1959.

In January 1959, Cuban revolutionary leader, Fidel Castro entered Havana and took control of the country. After the revolution, Argentina maintained relations with the new Cuban government and in May 1959, Castro paid a visit to Argentina and met with Argentine President Arturo Frondizi. In August 1961, Argentine born Cuban revolutionary commander, Ernesto "Che" Guevara secretly returned to Argentina for a few hours and met with President Arturo Frondizi and an aunt of his before leaving the country.

In December 1961, Cuba declared itself Marxist and socialist, and aligned with the Soviet Union. As a result, and by U.S. pressure, on 21 January 1962, Cuba was expelled from the Organization of American States (OAS) and by September 1962, the United States imposed a full embargo on Cuba. That same year, by U.S. insistence, Argentina and all Latin American nations (with the exception of Mexico) broke diplomatic relations with Cuba in an effort to isolate the Castro government.

On 28 May 1973, under President Héctor Cámpora, Argentina became the third nation (after Chile and Peru) to re-establish diplomatic relations with Cuba. Former Cuban President Osvaldo Dorticós Torrado became ambassador to Argentina. Relations between both nations greatly improved under the presidency of Juan Perón. Argentina granted Cuba a credit for US$200 million per year for six years. During the Argentine military dictatorship (1976–1983), Cuba maintained relations with Argentina. During the Falklands War between Argentina and the United Kingdom in April–June 1982; Cuba supported Argentina's rights over the Falkland Islands (Islas Malvinas) and funneled weapons to Argentina from Libya via Brazil.

In October 1986, Argentine President Raúl Alfonsín paid an official visit to Cuba, becoming the first Argentine President to do so. In 1995, Castro returned to Argentina to attend the 5th Ibero-American Summit in Bariloche where he met with Argentine President Carlos Menem. Relations between both nations became tense when in 1997, during the 7th Ibero-American Summit in Isla Margarita, Venezuela, President Menem called for democracy in Cuba and for the end of human rights violations on the island. In November 1999, President Menem declined to attend the 9th Ibero-American Summit being held in Havana.

Relations between Argentina and Cuba improved during the presidency of Néstor Kirchner. In 2003, Fidel Castro returned to Argentina to attend the inauguration of President Kirchner. Castro returned one last time to Argentina in 2006 to attend a Mercosur summit in Córdoba. In July 2006, Fidel's younger brother, Raúl Castro, took over as acting President of Cuba and in 2008, Raúl became official President of Cuba. In 2009, Argentine President Cristina Fernández de Kirchner paid a visit to Cuba and visited with both Fidel and Raúl Castro. President Fernández de Kirchner would re-visit Cuba in 2013.

In December 2015 Mauricio Macri became President of Argentina. In October 2016, Presidents Raúl Castro and Mauricio Macri met in Cartagena, Colombia; both leaders attending as witnesses to the signing of the peace treaty between the Colombian Government and the FARC. During their reunion, both Presidents announced that the two governments hope to reach an agreement on Cuba's outstanding debt to Argentina of US$11 billion from its original debt of US$1.3 billion which Cuba borrowed in 1973 (plus unpaid interest).

Presidency of Javier Milei since 2023 meant a significant change in Argentina’s foreign policy toward Cuba. Argentina voted at the United Nations (UN) General Assembly in favour of the embargo that the United States has maintained on Cuba since 1960, meaning Argentina was one of only seven countries that backed the embargo, alongside Hungary, Israel, North Macedonia, Paraguay, Ukraine, and the United States. President Milei released a statement stating that Argentina "categorically opposes the Cuban dictatorship."

== High-level visits ==
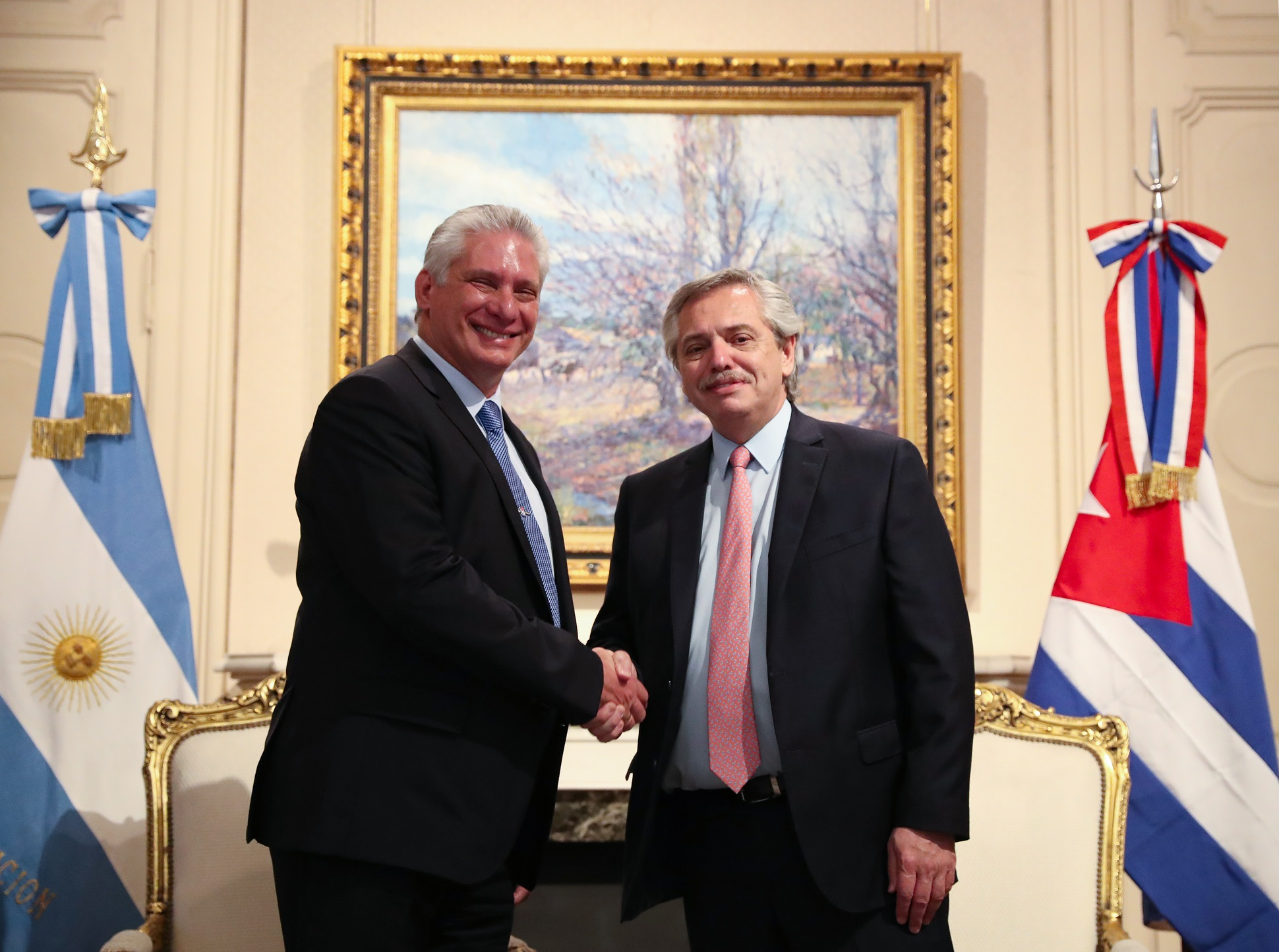
Argentine President Alberto Fernandez with Cuban President Miguel Díaz-Canel in Buenos Aires, 2019.

High-level visits from Argentina to Cuba

- President Raúl Alfonsín (1986)
- President Cristina Fernández de Kirchner (2009, 2013)

High-level visits from Cuba to Argentina

- President Fidel Castro (1995, 2003, 2006) (Note: Fidel Castro also visited the country in 1959, although at the time of the visit he held the office of Prime Minister of Cuba.)
- President Miguel Díaz-Canel (2019)

== Tourism and Transportation ==
In 2013, 84,000 Argentine tourists visited Cuba, making Argentina the largest tourist provider to Cuba from Latin America and the 5th largest globally. There are direct flights between Argentina and Cuba with Cubana de Aviación.

== Trade ==
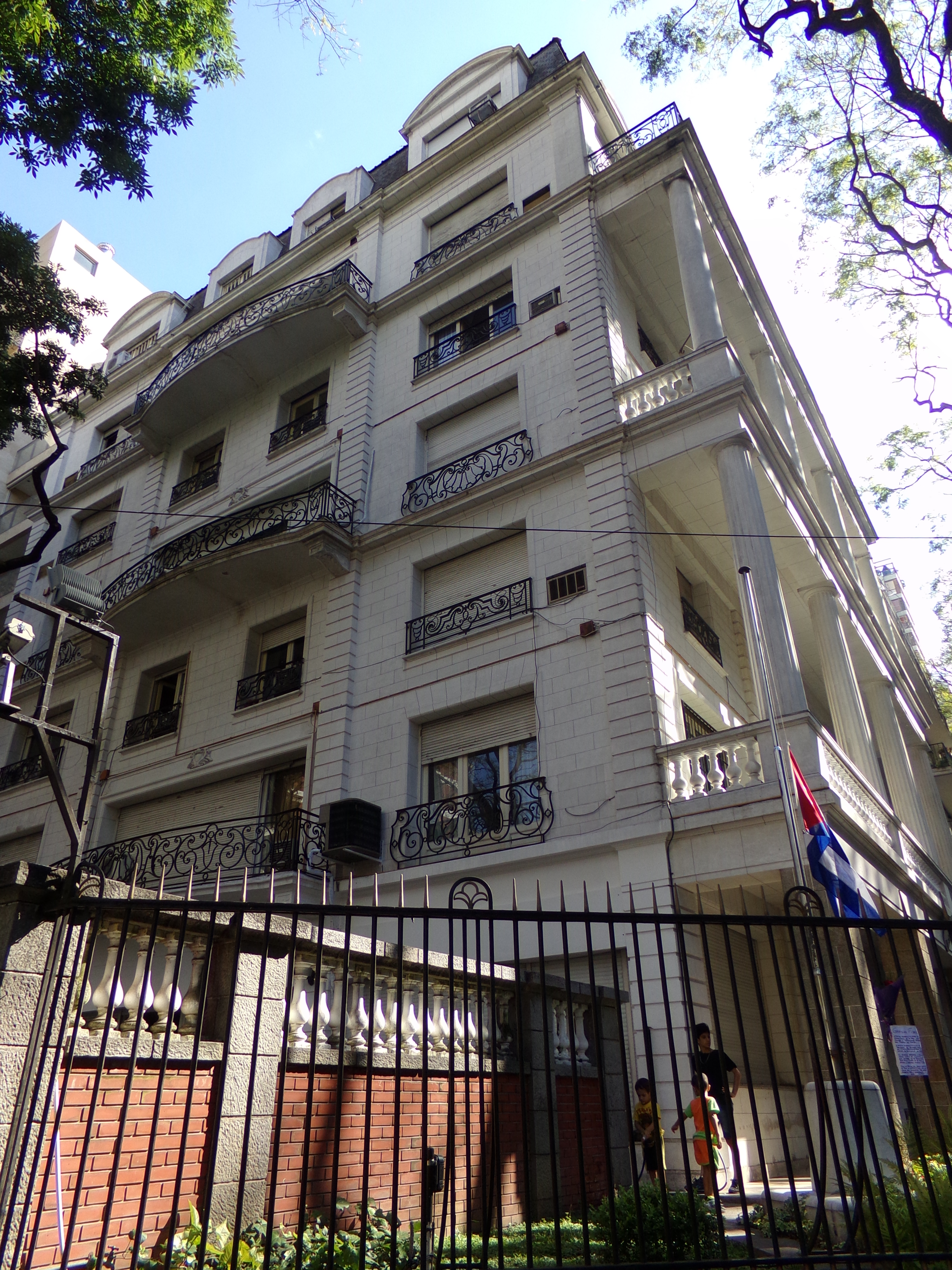
Embassy of Cuba in Buenos Aires

In 2017, trade between Argentina and Cuba totaled US$200 million. Argentina's exports to Cuba are mainly food based while Cuban exports to Argentina are mainly pharmaceutical products and medicine.

== Resident diplomatic missions ==
- Argentina has an embassy in Havana.
- Cuba has an embassy in Buenos Aires.

== See also ==
- Ernesto "Che" Guevara
- Events leading to the Falklands War
