= West Stanley (constituency) =

Falkland Islands constituency

- Former Falkland Islands Legislative Council constituency
- Location of West Stanley within the Falkland Islands
- Major settlements: Stanley (partly)

Former constituency
- Created: 1977
- Abolished: 1985
- Number of members: One
- Replaced by: Stanley

West Stanley was a constituency of the Legislative Council of the Falkland Islands which existed from 1977 until 1985. The constituency was created in 1977 with the implementation of the Falkland Islands (Legislative Council) Order 1977 – which created six constituencies – and was abolished just eight years later when the Falkland Islands Constitution came into force in 1985. The constituency of West Stanley elected one member to the Legislative Council and consisted of the westerly area of the capital city. West Stanley is now part of the Stanley constituency.

== Members ==
Election	Member
1977	Stuart Barrett Wallace
1981	John Edward Cheek
1985	Constituency abolished.
