= 1985 Falkland Islands general election =

The Falkland Islands general election of 1985 was held on Thursday 3 October 1985 to elect members to the Legislative Council. Eight Councillors were elected through universal suffrage using block voting, four from each constituency (Camp and Stanley).

It was the first election since Falkland Islands Constitution Order 1985 came into force which increased the number of elected Councillors to eight (four from each constituency) and abolished four constituencies (East Falkland, East Stanley, West Falkland and West Stanley).

== Results ==
Candidates in bold were elected. Candidates in italic were incumbents.

=== Camp constituency ===
Camp result
List	Candidates	Votes	Of total (%)	± from prev.
Nonpartisan	**Anthony Thomas Blake**	Uncontested	N/A	N/A
Nonpartisan	**Lionel Geoffrey Blake**	Uncontested	N/A	N/A
Nonpartisan	**Robin Myles Lee**	Uncontested	N/A	N/A
Nonpartisan	**Timothy John Durose Miller**	Uncontested	N/A	N/A

=== Stanley constituency ===
Stanley result
List	Candidates	Votes	Of total (%)	± from prev.
Nonpartisan	**Darwin Lewis Clifton**	379	21.7	N/A
Nonpartisan	**Charles Desmond Keenleyside, Jr**	275	15.8	N/A
Nonpartisan	**Norma Edwards**	200	11.5	N/A
Nonpartisan	**John Edward Cheek** (Note: John Edward Cheek was elected as a member for the West Stanley constituency at the previous election)	193	11.1	N/A
Nonpartisan	William Edward Bowles	180	10.3	−9.6
Nonpartisan	Terence Severine Betts	150	8.6	N/A
Nonpartisan	Terence John Peck	131	7.5	−15.8
Nonpartisan	Derek Stanley Evans	126	7.2	N/A
Nonpartisan	Phillip John Middleton	109	6.3	N/A
Turnout		1743		
