= Marjorie Vinson =

British-born Falkland Islander teacher (1905–2000)

Member of the Legislative Council
- In office 1964–1968
- Preceded by: George Bonner
- Succeeded by: Robin Pitaluga
- Constituency: East Falkland

Personal details
- Born: 21 May 1905 Liverpool, United Kingdom
- Died: 30 November 2000 (aged 95) Datchet, United Kingdom

Marjorie Vinson MBE (21 May 1905 – 30 November 2000) was a British-born teacher. After moving to the Falkland Islands she became the first woman to be elected to the islands' Legislative Council in 1964.

== Biography ==
Vinson was born in Liverpool in May 1905, the oldest of five children of Florence (née Greaves) and Ernest Downs, a ship captain. With her father often at sea, she raised her younger siblings during her teenage years. After training as a primary school teacher, she worked at several schools in Liverpool.

Following World War II Vinson moved to Stanley in the Falkland Islands to start a three-year contract as deputy head of the town's primary school. While in the Falklands, she met Dick Vinson. The couple married and she moved to North Arm, where they had two children and Vinson often taught children in the area when the visiting teacher was absent. The family moved to Darwin in 1964. In the same year she contested the elections to the Legislative Council. Winning the East Falkland by three votes, she became the first woman elected to the Legislative Council. During her term in the council she focused on education in Camp.

After leaving the Legislative Council, Vinson was awarded an MBE in the 1969 New Year Honours. When Dick retired in 1971, the couple moved to Datchet in England. She died in November 2000.
