= 1968 Falkland Islands general election =

The Falkland Islands general election of 1968 was held on 13–15 March 1968 to elect members to the Legislative Council. Four out of the ten Councillors were elected through universal suffrage, two from Stanley and one each from East Falkland and West Falkland.

== Results ==
Candidates in bold were elected. Candidates in italic were incumbents.

=== Stanley constituency ===
Stanley result
List	Candidates	Votes	Of total (%)	± from prev.
Nonpartisan	**Richard Victor Goss**	341	34.8	N/A
Nonpartisan	**Nanette King**	298	30.4	N/A
Nonpartisan	Kenneth Claud Summers	166	16.9	N/A
Nonpartisan	William Edward Bowles	135	13.8	N/A
Nonpartisan	Albert Henry Clifton	40	4.1	N/A
Turnout		980		

=== East Falkland constituency ===
East Falkland
List	Candidates	Votes	Of total (%)	± from prev.
Nonpartisan	**Robin Andreas Mackintosh Pitaluga**	114	43.5	N/A
Nonpartisan	Alan Charles Miller	83	31.7	N/A
Nonpartisan	Marjorie Vinson	65	24.8	−25.7
Turnout		262		

=== West Falkland constituency ===
West Falkland
List	Candidates	Votes	Of total (%)	± from prev.
Nonpartisan	**Sydney Miller**	165	77.5	+40.3
Nonpartisan	William Robert Luxton	48	22.5	+0.3
Turnout		213		
