= East Stanley (constituency) =

Constituency of the Falkland Islands (1977–1985)

- Former Falkland Islands Legislative Council constituency
- Location of East Stanley within the Falkland Islands
- Major settlements: Stanley (partly)

Former constituency
- Created: 1977
- Abolished: 1985
- Number of members: One
- Member: William Henry Goss
- Replaced by: Stanley

East Stanley was a constituency of the Legislative Council of the Falkland Islands which existed from 1977 until 1985. The constituency was created in 1977 with the implementation of the Falkland Islands (Legislative Council) Order 1977 and was abolished just eight years later when the Falkland Islands Constitution came into force in 1985. The constituency of East Stanley elected one member to the Legislative Council and consisted of the easterly area of the capital city. East Stanley is now part of the Stanley constituency. William Henry Goss represented the constituency throughout its existence.

== Members ==
Election	Member
1977	William Henry Goss
1981	William Henry Goss
1985	Constituency abolished.
