= 1949 Falkland Islands general election =

General elections were held in the Falkland Islands for the first time on 17 February 1949, to elect four of the 12 members of the Legislative Council. Two were elected from Stanley and one each from East Falkland and West Falkland. Owing to the remoteness of some settlements and the unpredictability of the weather in the Falkland Islands, the elections took place over several days.

The Legislative Council of the Falkland Islands was founded on 13 November 1845, with its entire membership being appointed by the Governor. On 26 November 1948, in a meeting of the Privy Council, King George VI approved Legislative Council (Elections) Ordinance No. 16 of 1948 which introduced elections to the Falklands for the first time, giving four seats of the Legislative Council to elected members.

== Results ==
From a population of around 2,270 at the end of 1948, at the start of February a total of 834 people were registered to vote in the elections; 482 in Stanley, 193 in East Falkland and 159 in West Falkland. 270 people voted in Stanley, a turnout of 56%.

Constituency	Candidate	Votes	Notes
Stanley	Stanley Charles Luxton	211	Elected
Stanley	Arthur Leslie Hardy	126	Elected
Stanley	William John Hutchinson	118	
East Falkland	Arthur Grenfell Barton		Elected
West Falkland	Keith William Luxton		Elected
Source: Falkland Islands Weekly News, National Archives

David William Roberts and William John Hutchinson were appointed as unofficial members (selected based on their "knowledge of local affairs"), while Bernard Noel Biggs (Collector of Customs), Eric Francis Bunting (Executive Engineer) and David Masterton Honeyman (Officer in Charge, Education Department) were appointed as official members. The Colonial Secretary, Senior Medical Officer and Agricultural Officer were all appointed as ex officio members.

== Aftermath ==
The newly constituted Legislative Council met for the first time on 4 March.

In January 1950 Arthur Grenfell Barton resigned as an elected member, but was then appointed as a nominated unofficial member to replace David William Roberts, who had left the islands. The subsequent by-election in April had only one candidate, John Francis Bonner, who was returned unopposed.

The other nominated unofficial member, William John Hutchinson, also resigned in 1950 and was replaced by Madge Biggs, who became the first female member of the Legislative Council.
