= Calm Head =

Most southwesterly point of the Falkland Islands

Coordinates: 52.1082°S 60.9206°W

Calm Head (Spanish: Punta Serena) is the most south westerly point of the Falkland Islands, and is on West Falkland. It is to the south west of Port Stephens, and shelters it.

Bird Island is nearby.
