= 1976 Falkland Islands general election =

The Falkland Islands general election of 1976 was held in 1976 to elect members to the Legislative Council. Four out of the ten Councillors were elected through universal suffrage, two from Stanley and one each from East Falkland and West Falkland. The election was delayed twice, first in November 1975 when the dissolution of the Legislative Council was postponed by ten weeks to 31 January 1976 and then again in January 1976 when it was postponed to 28 February 1976. This was done in the hope that the election would be held under the proposed new constitution and to allow the Falkland Islanders opportunity to study the report of the Select Committee before the election took place. In reality, the new constitution did not come into force until the following year, with the first election under the new constitution taking place in October 1977, just 15 months after the last election.

== Results ==
Candidates in bold were elected. Candidates in italic were incumbents.

=== Stanley constituency ===
Stanley result
List	Candidates	Votes	Of total (%)	± from prev.
Nonpartisan	**John Smith**	343	42.0	N/A
Nonpartisan	**William Edward Bowles**	328	40.2	+8.7
Nonpartisan	Desmond George Buckley King	145	17.8	N/A
Turnout		816		

=== East Falkland constituency ===
East Falkland
List	Candidates	Votes	Of total (%)	± from prev.
Nonpartisan	**Adrian Bertrand Monk**	155	79.1	+8.4
Nonpartisan	Brook Hardcastle	41	20.9	N/A
Turnout		196		

=== West Falkland constituency ===
West Falkland
List	Candidates	Votes	Of total (%)	± from prev.
Nonpartisan	**Lionel Geoffrey Blake**	97	58.1	N/A
Nonpartisan	Alan David Cusworth	70	41.9	N/A
Turnout		167		
