= Madge Biggs =

Falkland Islands librarian and politician (1902–1985)

- Biggs in 1942

Nominated Member of the Legislative Council
- In office 1950–1952

Personal details
- Born: 26 July 1902; Stanley, Falkland Islands
- Died: 8 September 1995 (aged 93)

Madge Brigid Francis Biggs MBE (26 July 1902 – 8 September 1995) was a Falkland Islands librarian and politician. In 1950 she became the first woman to sit in the Legislative Council.

== Biography ==
Biggs was born in Marmont Row, Stanley in July 1902 to Mary and Vincent Biggs, a shipwright who worked for the Falkland Islands Company. One of nine children, she attended school at St Mary's. She trained as a teacher, before becoming the government librarian, a role she held for nearly half a century. She also trained to become the first radiographer on the islands and worked at King Edward VII Memorial Hospital for nine years. She later took over the family sweet shop after the death of her brother, running it until selling it to the Falklands Islands Company in 1982.

At the start of World War II she became treasurer of the Falkland Islands Red Cross Society. During the war she set up a canteen for British troops stationed on the islands. She was awarded an MBE in the 1949 Birthday Honours. The following year she was appointed to the Legislative Council, becoming its first female member. She remained a member for two years.

Biggs left the Falklands only twice during her life; once to Montevideo during World War II to purchase spectacles, and once to the United Kingdom for medical treatment late in her life. She died in September 1995.
