= Operation Journeyman =

Royal Navy taskforce to Falklands, 1977

Operation Journeyman was a Royal Navy operation in which a naval taskforce was secretly sent to the Falkland Islands in November 1977 to prevent an Argentine invasion.

== Operation ==
The operation was ordered by James Callaghan after a party from the Argentine Air Force landed on Thule Island, one of the South Sandwich Islands, and constructed a base with barracks and a concrete helicopter landing pad. They set up a weather station, a radio station, and a flagpole from which the Argentine flag flew. This prompted fears of an Argentine invasion of the Falklands. The British Foreign Office states that prompt action against the Argentines prevented a more serious attack. The force, planned under heavy security, was commanded by Captain Hugh Balfour, the commanding officer of the frigate HMS Phoebe, which was accompanied by the nuclear submarine HMS Dreadnought, the frigate HMS Alacrity, and two auxiliaries, RFA Resurgent and RFA Olwen in support. The Argentines rapidly became aware of the taskforce's presence, but their forces remained on Thule and Callaghan decided against the use of force to evict them.

== Rules of engagement ==
The 1977 rules of engagement were: "Commanding officers and aircraft captains are to respond to any aggression with tactful firmness and are to exhibit a determination to meet any escalation, though not to exceed that already carried out by the enemy."

"All use of force must be governed by the principle of using only the minimum force necessary to achieve the aim." Such force must be used only until it was evident "that the immediate aim is being achieved, and must in no way be retaliatory".

The submarine commander was told: "If you are attacked with [anti-submarine] weapons by [Argentine] forces, you are to surface or withdraw at high speed submerged, whichever will be of least risk to life."

They also set up a 50-mile (80 km) security zone and any ships entering would be told that they must identify themselves and state their plans. Classified documents relating to Operation Journeyman were released in 2005.

== Bibliography ==
- Nigel West, "The secret war for the Falklands : SAS, MI6 And the War Whitehall Nearly Lost" (1997).
