= 1977 Falkland Islands general election =

The Falkland Islands general election of 1977 was held on Thursday 6 October 1977 to elect members to the Legislative Council. Six Councillors were elected through universal suffrage, one from each constituency.

The election took place just over a year after the last so that the changes to the Legislative Council under the new constitution could be implemented. The new constitution, which came into force under Falkland Islands (Legislative Council) (Amendment) Order 1977, abolished the remaining appointed members Councillors and increased the number of elected Councillors to six. The constitution also created three new constituencies (Camp, East Stanley and West Stanley) to add to the existing three (Stanley, East Falkland, West Falkland).

== Results ==
Candidates in bold were elected. Candidates in italic were incumbents.

=== Camp constituency ===
Camp result
List	Candidates	Votes	Of total (%)	± from prev.
Nonpartisan	**Timothy John Durose Miller**	163	42.7	N/A
Nonpartisan	William Robert Luxton	159	41.6	N/A
Nonpartisan	Alan David Cusworth	60	15.7	N/A
Turnout		382		

=== East Falkland constituency ===
East Falkland
List	Candidates	Votes	Of total (%)	± from prev.
Nonpartisan	**Adrian Bertrand Monk**	Uncontested	N/A	N/A

=== East Stanley constituency ===
East Stanley result
List	Candidates	Votes	Of total (%)	± from prev.
Nonpartisan	**William Henry**	Uncontested	N/A	N/A

=== Stanley constituency ===
Stanley result
List	Candidates	Votes	Of total (%)	± from prev.
Nonpartisan	**William Edward Bowles**	156	37.3	−2.9
Nonpartisan	John Edward Cheek	109	26.1	N/A
Nonpartisan	David Anthony Ryan	102	24.4	N/A
Nonpartisan	Eddie Anderson	51	12.2	N/A
Turnout		418		

=== West Falkland constituency ===
West Falkland
List	Candidates	Votes	Of total (%)	± from prev.
Nonpartisan	**Derek Stanley Evans**	99	55.3	N/A
Nonpartisan	Lionel Geoffrey Blake	42	23.5	−34.6
Nonpartisan	Alan David Cusworth	38	21.2	−20.7
Turnout		179		

=== West Stanley constituency ===
West Stanley result
List	Candidates	Votes	Of total (%)	± from prev.
Nonpartisan	**Stuart Barrett Wallace**	89	44.9	N/A
Nonpartisan	John Edward Cheek	60	30.3	N/A
Nonpartisan	David Anthony Ryan	49	24.7	N/A
Turnout		198		
