= 1952 Falkland Islands general election =

The Falkland Islands general election of 1952 was held in May and June 1952 to elect members to the Legislative Council. Four out of the twelve Councillors were elected through universal suffrage, two from Stanley and one each from East Falkland and West Falkland. Owing to the remoteness of some settlements and the unpredictability of the weather on the Falkland Islands, the election took place over several days.

== Results ==
Candidates in italic were incumbents.

Constituency	Members elected
Stanley	Arthur Leslie Hardy
Stanley	Stanley Charles Luxton
East Falkland	Thomas Andrew Gilruth
West Falkland	Keith William Luxton
