= Hugh Balfour =

Scottish Royal Navy officer

Rear-Admiral Hugh Balfour CB LVO
- Born: 29 April 1933; Malta
- Died: 29 June 1999 (aged 66)
- Military career
- Allegiance: United Kingdom
- Branch: Royal Navy
- Service years: 1951–90
- Rank: Rear-Admiral
- Commands: HMS Sheraton; HMS Whitby; HMS Phoebe; HMS Exeter; Royal Navy of Oman
- Conflicts: Falklands War
- Awards: Lieutenant of the Royal Victorian Order; Companion of the Order of the Bath; Military Order of Oman

Rear-Admiral Hugh Maxwell Balfour, CB, LVO (29 April 1933 – 29 June 1999) was a Scottish Royal Navy officer.

== Early life ==
Hugh Balfour was born in Malta into a Royal Navy family on 29 April 1933, and received his early formal education at Ardvreck School, Crieff, and at Kelly College, Tavistock.

== Early naval career ==
He joined the Royal Navy in 1951, and qualified as a signal officer in 1959. He served on HMS Rothesay from 1960 to 1962 before gaining his first command in 1963 as a lieutenant on the Ton-class minesweeper, HMS Sheraton.

From 1965 to 1967 he served as staff officer operations and senior communications officer to the senior naval officer West Indies (Snowi). He then went on to command HMS Whitby, and took part in the Beira Patrol off the coast of Mozambique.

His next appointment was as commander (communications) at HMS Dryad, at the Royal Navy's Tactical School. From 1972 to 1974 he was the commander of HMY Britannia. In 1974 he was appointed as a Lieutenant of the Royal Victorian Order.

In 1976 he was appointed captain of HMS Phoebe, and in 1977 he led 'Operation Journeyman', a small task force of ships that was dispatched to the South Atlantic Ocean with the objective of deterring aggression to British territories there from the Argentine Armed Forces, including Falkland Islands.

On his return to the United Kingdom he was appointed Deputy-Director of Command, Control and Communications. He then served as the Royal Navy's Chief Signals Officer from 1979 to 1981.

== Falklands War ==
Balfour was the Captain of HMS Exeter when the Argentine Armed Forces militarily invaded the Falkland Islands on 2 April 1982. Exeter was on duty at that moment in the Caribbean, acting as a guardship for British troops protecting Belize from aggression from the Government of Guatemala. Whilst waiting for orders he prepared the ship for battle with a series of war exercises.

Following the loss of HMS Sheffield in action at the Falklands, Balfour received orders to sail for them on 5 May 1982. On route Exeter had a secret meeting with the tanker British Esk to refuel, and Balfour received a tactical briefing from Sam Salt, the captain of sunk HMS Sheffield (who was returning with his surviving crew to England) on the naval battle situation raging in the Falklands, where the Royal Navy was under repeat air assaults from fighter jets of the Argentine Navy and Air Force. Exeter reached the Falklands and joined the task force on 22 May 1982, during the British amphibious assault landings to retake the Islands at San Carlos water. Exeter's primary role was to protect the task force, and provide early warning of incoming hostile aircraft and missiles using her Type 1022 Radar. During the fighting over the next three weeks she shot down two attacking Argentine A-4C Skyhawks on 30 May 1982, and a hostile Learjet 35A on 7 June 1982 using her Sea Dart missile system. The conflict ended with the British capture of Port Stanley on 14 June 1982.

== Later career ==
From 1983 to 1985 Balfour was director of the Maritime Tactical School and promoted to Rear-Admiral. Between 1985 and 1990 he was Commander of the Royal Navy of Oman, and awarded the Military Order of Oman on his retirement. In 1990 he was also appointed a Companion of the Order of the Bath.

== Post-military career ==
On his retirement from the Royal Navy he became a communications consultant.

== Death ==
Balfour died from the effects of a cancer on 29 June 1999 in his 67th year.

== Personal life ==
He married Sheila Ann Weldon in 1958, the marriage producing two daughters and a son.
