= 1960 Falkland Islands general election =

The Falkland Islands general election of 1960 was held on 24 and 25 March 1960 to elect members to the Legislative Council. Four out of the twelve Councillors were elected through universal suffrage, two from Stanley and one each from East Falkland and West Falkland. The Legislative Council was intended to be dissolved on 29 February 1960 but to suit farming arrangements it was dissolved almost two months early, on 2 January.

== Results ==
Candidates in bold were elected. Candidates in italic were incumbents.

=== Stanley constituency ===
Stanley result
| List | Candidates | Votes | Of total (%) | ± from prev. |
|---|---|---|---|---|
| Nonpartisan | **Arthur Leslie Hardy** | uncontested | N/A | N/A |
| Nonpartisan | **Richard Victor Goss** | uncontested | N/A | N/A |

=== East Falkland constituency ===
East Falkland
| List | Candidates | Votes | Of total (%) | ± from prev. |
|---|---|---|---|---|
| Nonpartisan | **George Christopher Reginald Bonner** | uncontested | N/A | N/A |

=== West Falkland constituency ===
West Falkland
| List | Candidates | Votes | Of total (%) | ± from prev. |
|---|---|---|---|---|
| Nonpartisan | **Lewis Arnold Charles Bedford** | **75** | 39.1 | N/A |
| Nonpartisan | James Blyth | 61 | 31.8 | N/A |
| Nonpartisan | Stanley Frank Miller | 56 | 29.2 | N/A |
| Turnout | | 192 | | |
