= 1964 Falkland Islands general election =

The Falkland Islands general election of 1964 was held on 16 and 17 March 1964 to elect members to the Legislative Council. Four out of the ten Councillors were elected through universal suffrage, two from Stanley and one each from East Falkland and West Falkland. It was the first election in the Falklands after the number of Councillors was reduced from twelve to ten, with the abolition two appointed members of the Council. Marjorie Vinson became the first woman to be elected to the Council, winning the seat of East Falkland.

== Results ==
Candidates in bold were elected. Candidates in italic were incumbents.

=== Stanley constituency ===
Stanley result
List	Candidates	Votes	Of total (%)	± from prev.
Labour Federation	**Frederick John Cheek**	uncontested	N/A	N/A
Labour Federation	**Richard Victor Goss**	uncontested	N/A	N/A

=== East Falkland constituency ===
East Falkland
List	Candidates	Votes	Of total (%)	± from prev.
Nonpartisan	**Marjorie Vinson**	145	50.5	N/A
Nonpartisan	Christopher Bonner	142	49.5	N/A
Turnout		287		

=== West Falkland constituency ===
West Falkland
List	Candidates	Votes	Of total (%)	± from prev.
Nonpartisan	**Sydney Miller**	80	37.2	N/A
Nonpartisan	Roderick Bonner	63	29.2	N/A
Nonpartisan	William Luxton	48	22.2	N/A
Nonpartisan	Michael Shaw	25	11.6	N/A
Turnout		216		
