= East Falkland (constituency) =

Constituency of the Falkland Islands (1949–1985)

- Former Falkland Islands Legislative Council constituency
- Location of East Falkland within the Falkland Islands
- Major settlements: Port Louis, Darwin, Port San Carlos, San Carlos, Salvador, Johnson's Harbour, Fitzroy, Mare Harbour, and Goose Green

Former constituency
- Created: 1949
- Abolished: 1985
- Number of members: One
- Replaced by: Camp

East Falkland was a constituency of the Legislative Council of the Falkland Islands which was in existence from the first elections in the Falklands in 1949 until the 1985 election when the Falkland Islands Constitution came into force, abolishing the constituency. The constituency of East Falkland elected one member to the Legislative Council and consisted of the whole area of the island of East Falkland, excluding Stanley, and some neighbouring islands. In 1964 it became the first seat to elect a female Councillor, Marjorie Vinson. East Falkland is now part of the Camp constituency.

== Members ==
Election	Member
1949	Arthur Grenfell Barton
1952	Thomas Andrew Gilruth
1956	Thomas Andrew Gilruth
1960	George Christopher Reginald Bonner
1964	Marjorie Vinson
1968	Robin Andreas Mackintosh Pitaluga
1971	Adrian Bertrand Monk
1976	Adrian Bertrand Monk
1977	Adrian Bertrand Monk
1981	Ronald Eric Binnie
1985	Constituency abolished.
