= Cape Meredith =

Southernmost point of West Falkland, Falkland Islands

Coordinates: 52.2564°S 60.6418°W

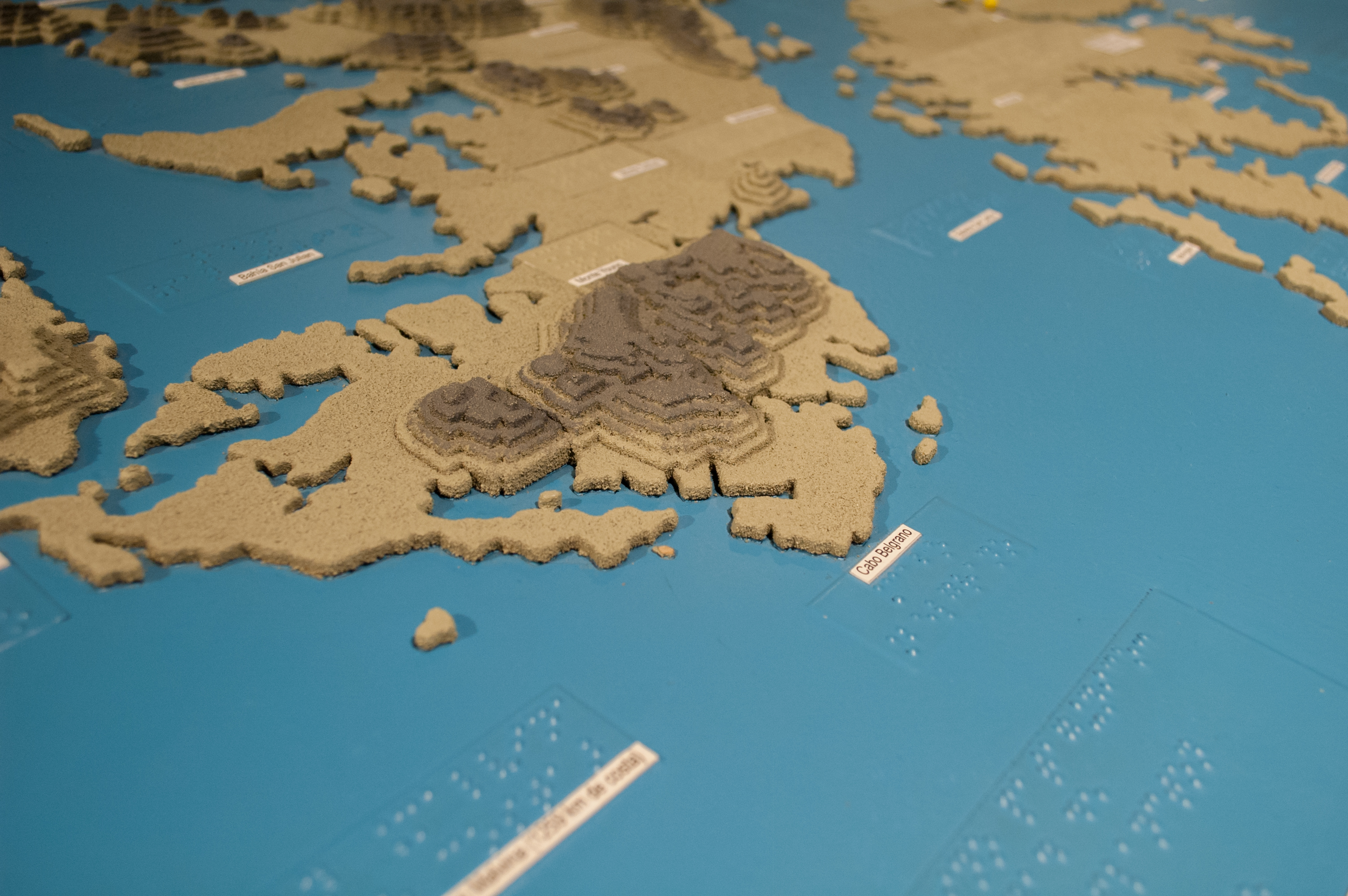

Cape Meredith (Spanish: Cabo Meredith; Argentine name "Cabo Belgrano") is the southernmost point of West Falkland in the Falkland Islands. About 9 miles (14 km) northwest is the town of Port Stephens.

There is a shanty in the area, which is a listed building.
