= 1971 Falkland Islands general election =

The Falkland Islands general election of 1971 was held on 30 November – 2 December 1971 to elect members to the Legislative Council. Four out of the ten Councillors were elected through universal suffrage, two from Stanley and one each from East Falkland and West Falkland.

== Results ==
Candidates in bold were elected. Candidates in italic were incumbents.

=== Stanley constituency ===
Stanley result
List	Candidates	Votes	Of total (%)	± from prev.
Nonpartisan	**William Edward Bowles**	260	31.5	N/A
Nonpartisan	**Sydney Miller**	254	30.8	N/A'"`UNIQ−−ref−00000022−QINU`"'
Nonpartisan	Sarah Jones Black Clements	216	26.2	N/A
Nonpartisan	Nanette King	96	11.6	−18.8
Turnout		862		

=== East Falkland constituency ===
East Falkland
List	Candidates	Votes	Of total (%)	± from prev.
Nonpartisan	**Adrian Bertrand Monk**	176	70.7	N/A
Nonpartisan	Alan Charles Miller	73	29.3	−2.4
Turnout		249		

=== West Falkland constituency ===
West Falkland
List	Candidates	Votes	Of total (%)	± from prev.
Nonpartisan	**Lionel Geoffrey Blake**	Uncontested	N/A	N/A
