= 1956 Falkland Islands general election =

The Falkland Islands general election of 1956 was held in March and April 1956 to elect members to the Legislative Council. Four out of the twelve Councillors were elected through universal suffrage, two from Stanley and one each from East Falkland and West Falkland. Owing to the remoteness of some settlements and the unpredictability of the weather on the Falkland Islands, the election took place over several days.

== Results ==
Candidates in bold were elected. Candidates in italic were incumbents.

=== Stanley constituency ===
Stanley result
List	Candidates	Votes	Of total (%)	± from prev.
Nonpartisan	**Arthur Leslie Hardy**	**132**	**36.9**	N/A
Nonpartisan	**Martin George Creece**	**117**	**32.7**	N/A
Nonpartisan	Richard Victor Goss	109	30.4	N/A
Turnout		358		

=== East Falkland constituency ===
East Falkland
List	Candidates	Votes	Of total (%)	± from prev.
Nonpartisan	**Thomas Andrew Gilruth**	Uncontested	N/A	N/A

=== West Falkland constituency ===
West Falkland
List	Candidates	Votes	Of total (%)	± from prev.
Nonpartisan	**Sydney Miller**	Uncontested	N/A	N/A
