= 1981 Falkland Islands general election =

The Falkland Islands general election of 1981 was held on Thursday 1 October 1981 to elect members to the Legislative Council. Six Councillors were elected through universal suffrage, one from each constituency (Camp, East Falkland, East Stanley, West Falkland, West Stanley and Stanley).

== Results ==
Candidates in bold were elected. Candidates in italic were incumbents.

=== Camp constituency ===
Camp result
List	Candidates	Votes	Of total (%)	± from prev.
Nonpartisan	**Anthony Thomas Blake**	173	50.6	N/A
Nonpartisan	Timothy John Durose Miller	126	36.8	−5.9
Nonpartisan	Alan Charles Miller	43	12.6	N/A
Turnout		342		

=== East Falkland constituency ===
East Falkland result
List	Candidates	Votes	Of total (%)	± from prev.
Nonpartisan	**Ronald Eric Binnie**	133	64.9	N/A
Nonpartisan	Brook Hardcastle	72	35.1	N/A
Turnout		205		

=== East Stanley constituency ===
East Stanley result
List	Candidates	Votes	Of total (%)	± from prev.
Nonpartisan	**William Henry Goss**	93	47.7	N/A
Nonpartisan	Stuart Barrett Wallace	43	22.1	N/A
Nonpartisan	Michael Ronald Harris	37	19.0	N/A
Nonpartisan	Christopher Richard Spall	22	11.3	N/A
Turnout		195		

=== Stanley constituency ===
Stanley result
List	Candidates	Votes	Of total (%)	± from prev.
Nonpartisan	**Terence John Peck**	110	23.3	N/A
Nonpartisan	William Edward Bowles	94	19.9	N/A
Nonpartisan	Stuart Barrett Wallace	74	15.7	N/A'"`UNIQ−−ref−00000031−QINU`"'
Nonpartisan	Desmond George Buckley King	58	12.3	N/A
Nonpartisan	Donald Davidson	56	11.9	N/A
Nonpartisan	Michael Ronald Harris	41	8.7	N/A
Nonpartisan	Janet Lynda Cheek	39	8.3	N/A
Turnout		472		

=== West Falkland constituency ===
West Falkland result
List	Candidates	Votes	Of total (%)	± from prev.
Nonpartisan	**Lionel Geoffrey Blake**	Uncontested	N/A	N/A

=== West Stanley constituency ===
West Stanley result
List	Candidates	Votes	Of total (%)	± from prev.
Nonpartisan	**John Edward Cheek**	115	42.4	+12.1
Nonpartisan	William Edward Bowles	67	24.7	N/A
Nonpartisan	Desmond George Buckley King	61	22.5	N/A
Nonpartisan	Graham Leslie Bound	28	10.3	N/A
Turnout		271		
