= HMS Phoebe (F42) =

1966 Type 12I or Leander-class frigate of the Royal Navy

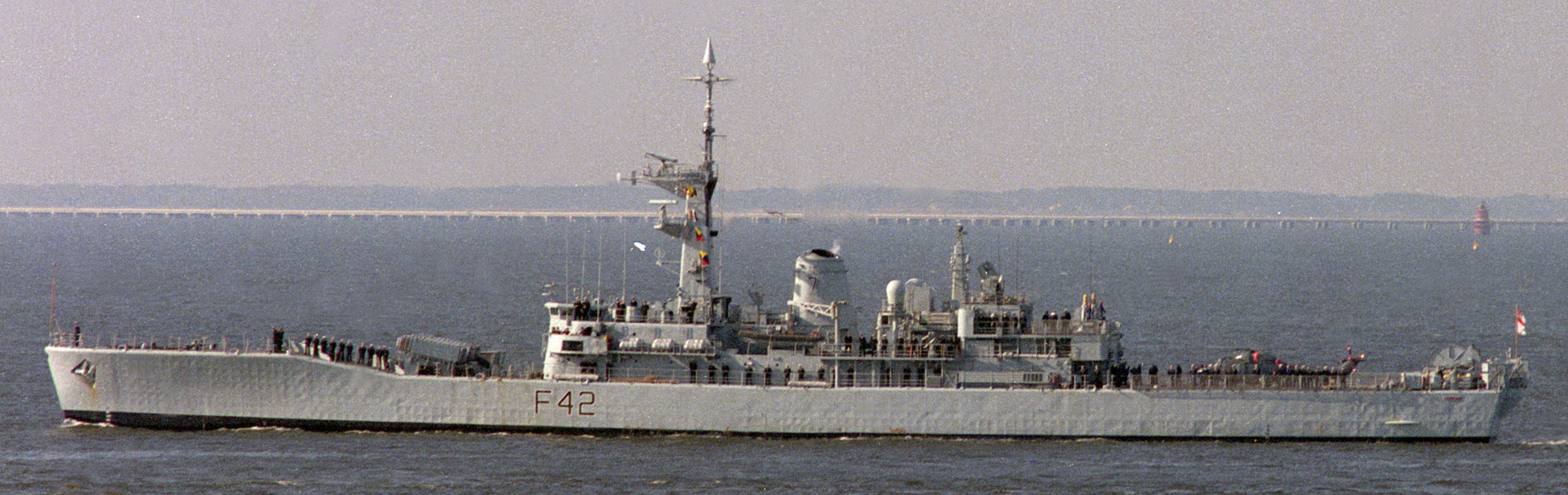
- HMS Phoebe in 1990

History

United Kingdom
- Name: HMS Phoebe
- Builder: Alexander Stephen and Sons
- Laid down: 25 July 1963
- Launched: 19 December 1964
- Commissioned: 15 May 1966
- Decommissioned: 14 February 1991
- Identification: Pennant number: F42
- Fate: Sold for scrap 1992

General characteristics
- Class & type: Leander-class frigate
- Displacement: 3,200 long tons (3,251 t) full load
- Length: 113.4 m (372 ft 1 in)
- Beam: 12.5 m (41 ft 0 in)
- Draught: 5.8 m (19 ft 0 in)
- Propulsion: 2 × Babcock & Wilcox boilers supplying steam to two sets of White-English Electric double-reduction geared turbines to two shafts
- Speed: 28 knots (52 km/h)
- Range: 4,600 nmi (8,500 km) at 15 knots (28 km/h)
- Complement: 223
- Armament: As built: 1 × twin 4.5 inch (114 mm) guns; 1 × quadruple Sea Cat anti-aircraft missile launchers; 1 × Limbo anti-submarine mortar; From 1977: 4 × Exocet anti-ship missile launchers; 2 × quadruple Seacat anti-aircraft missile launchers; 2 × single 40 mm Bofors anti-aircraft guns; 2 × triple torpedo tubes
- Aircraft carried: 1 × Westland Wasp helicopter; From 1978: 1 × Lynx helicopter

HMS Phoebe (F42) was a Leander-class frigate of the Royal Navy (RN). She was, like the rest of her class, named after a figure of mythology. Built by Alexander Stephen and Sons on the River Clyde, she was launched on 19 December 1964 and commissioned on 15 May 1966.

== Construction and description ==
Phoebe was ordered during 1962 as one of the first Batch 2 Leander-class frigates. The ship was laid down at Alexander Stephen and Sons Linthouse, Glasgow shipyard on 25 July 1963, was launched on 19 December 1964 and completed on 14 May 1966. She commissioned with the pennant number F42 on 15 May 1966.

Phoebe was 372 feet (113.4 m) long overall and 360 feet (109.7 m) at the waterline, with a beam of 41 feet (12.5 m) and a maximum draught of 18 feet (5.5 m). Displacement was 2,380 long tons (2,420 t) standard and 2,860 long tons (2,910 t) full load. The ship was fitted with Y-136 machinery, built by Cammell Laird. Two oil-fired Babcock & Wilcox boilers fed steam at 550 pounds per square inch (3,800 kPa) and 850 °F (454 °C) to a pair of double reduction geared steam turbines that in turn drove two propeller shafts, with the machinery rated at 30,000 shaft horsepower (22,000 kW), giving a speed of 28 knots (52 km/h; 32 mph).

A twin 4.5-inch (113 mm) Mark 6 gun mount was fitted forward. Anti-aircraft defence was provided by a quadruple Sea Cat surface-to-air missile launcher on the hangar roof, while two Oerlikon 20 mm cannon for close-in defence against surface targets. A Limbo anti-submarine mortar was fitted aft to provide a short-range anti-submarine capability, while a hangar and helicopter deck allowed a single Westland Wasp helicopter to be operated, for longer range anti-submarine and anti-surface operations.

As built, Phoebe was fitted with a large Type 965 long range air search radar on the ship's mainmast, with a Type 993 short range air/surface target indicating radar and Type 974 navigation radar carried on the ship's foremast. An MRS3 fire control system was carried over the ship's bridge to direct the 4.5-inch guns, while a GWS22 director for Seacat was mounted on the hangar roof. The ship had a sonar suite of Type 177 medium range search sonar, Type 162 bottom search and Type 170 attack sonar, together with a Type 199 variable depth sonar (VDS).

== Operational service ==
In the year of her commission, Phoebe assisted in the emotionally charged withdrawal from Aden in 1967. In 1969, Phoebe took part in the 20th Anniversary of NATO Fleet Review held at Spithead.

In February 1970, Phoebe undertook a 10-month overseas deployment, which included three assignments to the Beira Patrol off Mozambique in an attempt to stop the supply of oil to Rhodesia in contravention of an oil embargo. In April 1970, Phoebe left her Mozambique patrol to assist in the Indian Ocean as part of an Apollo 13 splashdown secondary task force. In 1971, Phoebe deployed to the West Indies. That same year, Phoebe was guard ship during talks between British Prime Minister Edward Heath and U.S. President Richard Nixon. She suffered minor damage when the frigate Berwick collided with her whilst attempting to leave Portsmouth Harbour during the first week in November 1971. In 1973, Phoebe took part in the Second Cod War, during the fishing disputes with Iceland.

Between 1973 and 1977 Phoebe was used for the filming of the popular Warship BBC drama, set on board the fictional HMS Hero.

In 1974, Phoebe commenced her modernisation, which including altering her weapons configuration. Her single 4.5-inch twin turret was removed in favour of the Exocet anti-ship missile system, giving her a powerful anti-surface capability. The number of SeaCat missiles she carried was increased. The modernisation was completed in 1977. She subsequently took part in the Silver Jubilee celebrations and Fleet Review, at which many warships attended from a variety of nations.

During late 1977 and early 1978, Phoebe led a task force on active service to the South Atlantic (Falklands) in company with HMS Alacrity, HMS Dreadnought and RFA's Resurgent and Olwen calling at Funchal, Madeira before returning home.

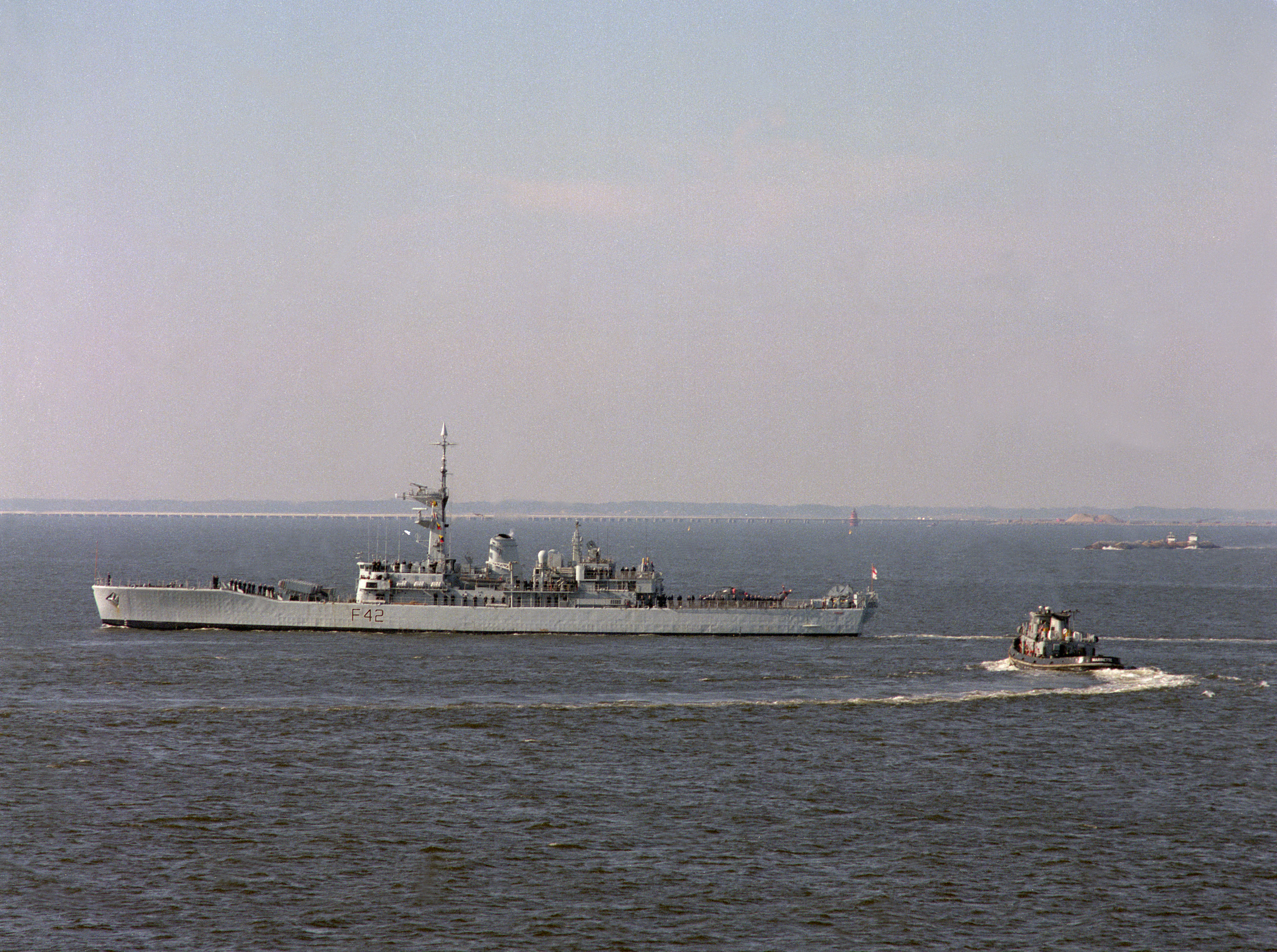
HMS Phoebe in 1990

In 1978, Phoebe patrolled in the Caribbean and subsequently joined Standing Naval Force Atlantic (STANAVFORLANT), a multi-national squadron of NATO in company with USS Pharris, the German frigate Emden, HMCS Okanagan and the Dutch frigate Tjerk Hiddes. In that year, Phoebe had the distinction of becoming the first frigate to operate the Westland Lynx attack helicopter aka 'Phelix', which remains in service, though obviously of a newer variant.In February 1981, Phoebe was refitted with Towed array sonar type 2031.

In September 1982, Phoebe deployed to the South Atlantic in the aftermath of the Falklands War, and performed a number of duties, though mainly patrolling in that region. In 1984, Phoebe completed her towed array sonar refit. In 1988, Phoebe again served under Standing Naval Force Atlantic and took part in the rescue effort in the tragic aftermath of the Piper Alpha oil rig explosion in the North Sea, which killed 167 people. Phoebe decommissioned in 1991 and was sold for scrap the following year. Some of her notable Commanding Officers include P E C Berger, G I Pritchard, Hugh Balfour and Jonathon Band.

Phoebe was adopted by the people of Bournemouth. In 1986 the freedom of the Borough of Bournemouth was conferred on her. In the Bournemouth Central Gardens there is a memorial seat dedicated to her as presented by the HMS Phoebe Association.

== Publications ==
- Colledge, J. J.; Warlow, Ben (2006) [1969]. Ships of the Royal Navy: The Complete Record of All Fighting Ships of the Royal Navy from the 15th Century to the Present (3rd Rev ed.). London: Chatham Publishing. ISBN 978-1-86176-281-8. OCLC 67375475.
- Marriott, Leo (1983). Royal Navy Frigates 1945–1983. Shepperton, Surrey, UK: Ian Allan Ltd. ISBN 0-7110-1322-5.
- Osborne, Richard; Sowdon, David (1990). Leander Class Frigates. Kendal, UK: World Ships Society. ISBN 0-905617-56-8.
