= Port Stephens, Falkland Islands =

Settlement and harbour on West Falkland

Coordinates: 52.0971°S 60.8322°W

Port Stephens is a settlement and a harbour on West Falkland, in the Falkland Islands.

== Geography ==
The 8-kilometre (5 mi) Dean's River, which rises on the mountains of Alice, Dean and Young, enters the sea through Port Stephens. In the early 1960s, the river was assessed as having over 27,000 salmon ova and fry.

The settlement is located in the southwestern corner of West Falkland, on the southeastern coast of Port Stephens Bay near Calm Head and Cape Meredith; South Harbour is the nearest other settlement. In 1989 the company split the farm into five units which were all bought by former employees. Port Stephens is one of the five sections of the original Port Stephens farm and is owned by Peter and Ann Robertson. A survey in 2005–2006 determined that the farm had over 11,000 sheep and produced over 34,000 kilograms (75,000 lb) of shorn wool. While the harbour itself is sheltered, the surrounding area is frequently very cold in winter.

== History ==
A census in 1888 detailed the settlement had a population of 39, with four houses and eight detached houses (which means shepherds huts).

It was one of the few settlements that were not visited or garrisoned by the Argentine military in the Falklands War. In 1987, the settlement hosted the annual Camp games (each settlement takes a turn in hosting each year), which expanded the population from 27 to 200.

== Wildlife ==
Nearby, thousands of birds, including rockhoppers, gentoo, and cormorants, breed on the coast. There is a self-catering cottage at Port Stephens with access to penguin colonies. Port Stephens is also where the plant plantago moorei was first found and described; it is named after David Moore who discovered it. The Port Stephens Formation, a quartzite rock of the Silurian-Devonian (West Falkland Group), was named after the location.
