= 2021 Falkland Islands general election =

- 4 November 2021

8 (of the 11) members to the Legislative Assembly 6 seats needed for a majority
	Majority party
Party	Nonpartisan
Seats won	8
- Map of constituencies of the Falkland Islands

The Falkland Islands general election of 2021 was held on Thursday 4 November 2021 to elect all eight members of the Legislative Assembly (five from the Stanley constituency and three from the Camp constituency) through universal suffrage using block voting, with the Chief Executive of the Falkland Islands acting as returning officer. It was the fourth election since the new Constitution came into force replacing the Legislative Council (which had existed since 1845) with the Legislative Assembly.

== Timing and procedure ==
Under the Constitution of the Falkland Islands, the Legislative Assembly must be dissolved four years after the first meeting of the Legislative Assembly following the last election (unless the Executive Council advises the Governor to dissolve the Legislative Assembly sooner). An election must then take place within 70 days of the dissolution.

As first meeting of the 2017-21 Legislative Assembly took place on 13 November 2017, the Legislative Assembly must be dissolved by midnight on 12 November 2021 and an election must take place before 21 January 2022. However, on 25 August 2021, the Executive Council announced that an early general election would take place on 4 November 2021.

Key dates
Date	Event
Wednesday 25 August	The Executive Council recommends an election take place on 4 November 2021
Friday 24 September	Dissolution of Legislative Assembly and appointment of election date made by proclamation. Notice of Election Published. Period for nominations opens.
Friday 15 October	Nominations close.
Thursday 21 October	List of candidates published.
Thursday 4 November	Polling day. Count of votes and announcement of results.

== Results ==
Incumbent members are in italics.

=== Stanley constituency ===
Stanley
List	Candidates	Votes	Of total (%)	± from prev.
Nonpartisan	Leona Vidal Roberts	839	17.69%	▲4.83pp
Nonpartisan	Roger Spink	691	14.57%	▼0.41pp
Nonpartisan	Pete Biggs	570	12.02%	N/A
Nonpartisan	Mark Pollard	550	11.60%	▼0.69pp
Nonpartisan	Gavin Short	486	10.25%	▲1.46pp
Nonpartisan	Stacy Bragger	484	10.20%	▼0.75pp
Nonpartisan	Gary Webb	362	7.63%	N/A
Nonpartisan	Emma Brook	351	7.40%	N/A
Nonpartisan	Chris Locke	192	4.05%	N/A
Nonpartisan	June Besley-Clark	120	2.53%	N/A
Nonpartisan	Zane Hirtle	94	1.98%	N/A
Total valid votes		4.739	99.92%	
Rejected ballots		4	0.08%	
Turnout		4,743	77.2%	
Registered electors				

=== Camp constituency ===
Camp
List	Candidates	Votes	Of total (%)	± from prev.
Nonpartisan	Teslyn Barkman	184	34.33%	▲8.87 pp
Nonpartisan	Ian Hansen	126	23.51%	▼3.78 pp
Nonpartisan	John Birmingham	122	22.76%	N/A
Nonpartisan	Ana Crowie	102	19.03%	N/A
Total valid votes		534	99.63%	
Rejected ballots		2	0.37%	
Turnout		536	86.6%	
Registered electors				
