= Keith Biles =

British-Falkland Islands politician

The Honourable Keith Biles OBE JP

Speaker of the Legislative Assembly of the Falkland Islands
- Incumbent
- Assumed office 27 February 2009
- Monarchs: Elizabeth II; Charles III
- Governor: Alan Huckle; Nigel Haywood; Colin Roberts; Nigel Phillips; Alison Blake; Colin Martin-Reynolds
- Preceded by: Darwin Lewis Clifton

Personal details
- Party: Nonpartisan
- Spouse: Kathy

Keith Robert Biles is a British-born Falkland Islands banker and politician who has served as the Speaker of the Legislative Assembly of the Falkland Islands since his election in 2009.

== Early life and career ==
Biles was born in the UK but moved to the Falkland Islands in 1995 as CEO of a branch of the Standard Chartered Bank. He retired from this position in 2002.

== Political career ==
In June 2012, Biles launched Heroes Welcome in the Falklands. Heroes Welcome UK is an open-resource community partnership scheme, designed to encourage a show of support to members of the British Armed Forces.

In 2014, Biles was amongst those who bid farewell to the outgoing Governor of the Falkland Islands, Nigel Haywood. Haywood's last official act was presenting the Governor's sword to Biles for safekeeping until the next Governor arrived.

In October 2022 he gave a draft statement about people holding dual nationality voting in elections or holding office. He clarified that the issue should be referred to the Supreme Court of the Falkland Islands by the Attorney General, stating it was the only body authorized to rule on constitutional manners, and stated the legislative assembly will retain equal and valid voting rights. This came after the MP for Camp, Teslyn Barkman, received New Zealand citizenship, with inquiries that it may be grounds for disqualification in elections.

== Personal life ==
He is married to the Rev. Kathy Biles, an Anglican cleric (ordained deacon in 2004 and priest in 2006) and Assistant at Christ Church Cathedral, Port Stanley.

== Honours ==
Biles was appointed an Officer of the Order of the British Empire (OBE) in the 2024 Birthday Honours for services to the community in the Falkland Islands.

Political offices
Preceded by Darwin Lewis Clifton	Speaker of the Legislative Assembly of the Falkland Islands; 2009–present	Incumbent
