= 2025 Falkland Islands general election =

- 11 December 2025

8 (of the 11) members to the Legislative Assembly 6 seats needed for a majority
- Turnout: 82.67%
	Majority party
Party	Nonpartisan
Seats won	8
- Map of constituencies of the Falkland Islands

General elections were held in the Falkland Islands on 11 December 2025 to elect the eight constituency members of the Legislative Assembly (five from the Stanley constituency and three from the Camp constituency) through universal suffrage using block voting, with the Chief Executive of the Falkland Islands acting as returning officer. It was the fifth election since the new constitution came into force, replacing the Legislative Council (which had existed since 1845) with the Legislative Assembly.

== Timing and procedure ==
Under the Constitution of the Falkland Islands, the Legislative Assembly must be dissolved by the Governor four years after the first meeting of the Legislative Assembly following the last election (unless the Executive Council advises the Governor to dissolve the Legislative Assembly sooner). An election must then take place within 70 days of the dissolution.

With the first meeting of the previous Legislative Assembly taking place on 8 November 2021, the Legislative Assembly had to be dissolved by midnight on 7 November 2025 and an election take place before 17 January 2026. However, on 7 August 2025, the Executive Council announced an early dissolution of the Legislative Assembly and an election to take place on Thursday 11 December 2025.

== Incumbent members ==
Member	Constituency	Votes
Leona Vidal Roberts	Stanley	839
Roger Spink	Stanley	691
Pete Biggs	Stanley	570
Mark Pollard	Stanley	550
Gavin Short	Stanley	486
Teslyn Barkman	Camp	184
Jack Ford	Camp	122 (Note: Elected at the 2023 Camp by-election.)
John Birmingham	Camp	122

== Candidates ==
Incumbent members are in italics.

=== Stanley constituency ===
Stanley
List	Candidates	Votes	Of total (%)	± from prev.
Nonpartisan	Lewis Clifton	844	14.10%	N/A
Nonpartisan	Dean Dent	701	11.71%	N/A
Nonpartisan	Cheryl Roberts	694	11.59%	N/A
Nonpartisan	Stacy Bragger	635	10.61%	▲0.41
Nonpartisan	Roger Spink	555	9.27%	▼5.30
Nonpartisan	Leona Vidal	520	8.69%	▼9.00
Nonpartisan	Lee Summers	422	7.05%	N/A
Nonpartisan	Glenn Ross	406	6.78%	N/A
Nonpartisan	Mark Pollard	323	5.40%	▼6.20
Nonpartisan	Gary Webb	243	4.06%	N/A
Nonpartisan	Gavin Short	228	3.81%	▼6.44
Nonpartisan	Clovis Kilmartin	136	2.27%	N/A
Nonpartisan	Grant Budd	128	2.14%	N/A
Nonpartisan	Pete Biggs	93	1.55%	▼10.47
Nonpartisan	Christopher Clarke	58	0.97%	N/A
Total valid votes		5,987	99.98%	
Rejected ballots		1	0.02%	
Turnout		1,295	81.4%	▲3.8
Registered electors		1590		

=== Camp constituency ===
Camp
List	Candidates	Votes	Of total (%)	± from prev.
Nonpartisan	Jack Ford	185	30.99%	N/A
Nonpartisan	Dot Gould	171	28.64%	N/A
Nonpartisan	Michael Goss	126	21.11%	N/A
Nonpartisan	Andy Watson	115	19.26%	N/A
Total valid votes		597	100%	
Rejected ballots		0	0%	
Turnout		217	90.8%	▲4.2
Registered electors		239		
