= Peter Biggs =

Peter Biggs may refer to:

- Peter Biggs (special effects artist)
- Peter Martin Biggs (1926–2021), British scientist
- Pete Biggs, Falkland Island politician

== See also ==
- Mary and Peter Biggs Award for Poetry
