= Eileen Vidal =

Kelper telephone and radio operator (1926–2003)

Eileen Vidal BEM
- Born: Eileen Biggs; 1926; Falkland Islands, Crown colony
- Died: October 2003 (aged 76–77); Falkland Islands, British Overseas Territory
- Occupations: Telephone operator; radio operator
- Spouse: Nelson Vidal
- Children: 12, including Leona Vidal
- Awards: British Empire Medal

Eileen Vidal BEM (née Biggs; 1926 – October 2003) was a Falklander telephone and radio operator, known for maintaining radio service and relayed military intelligence to the British Navy during the Falklands War. Vidal received a British Empire Medal for her service.

== Service during the Falklands War ==
From 1981 to 1991, Vidal was the islands government's principal radio telephone operator, jotting down telegrams and patching callers into Port Stanley's telephone system.

She established a trend of subversive radio transmissions on the morning of the Argentine invasion on 2 April 1982. On 26 April she reported via short wave radio to HMS Endurance, which was patrolling off the Falklands, the size of the Argentine reinforcements of the initial Argentine assault force, which were at least nine Argentine battalion-sized units, giving them as much information as possible about the number of Argentine ships and troops in Stanley, as well as about the aircraft and helicopters. Her message to HMS Endurance may have been the first information to come from the Falklands after the invasion because the short wave transmitters operated by Cable and Wireless had failed and the British Government had no firm information from the islands. The 2nd Battalion of the Parachute Regiment was alerted and set sail to the Falklands.

Vidal was awarded the British Empire Medal for her service during the war.

== Personal life ==
Eileen Biggs was born on 1926 in the Falkland Islands to Bernard Biggs and Kathleen Biggs. Vidal was a fifth generation Falkland Islander.

Vidal's first marriage ended in divorce and her second marriage was to Nelson Vidal, a Chilean who had immigrated to the Falkland Islands in the 1960s. Vidal had twelve children, including the curator, radio broadcaster and politician Leona Vidal.

In October 2003 Vidal died aged 76.
