= Alejandro Betts =

Argentine political activist (1947–2020)

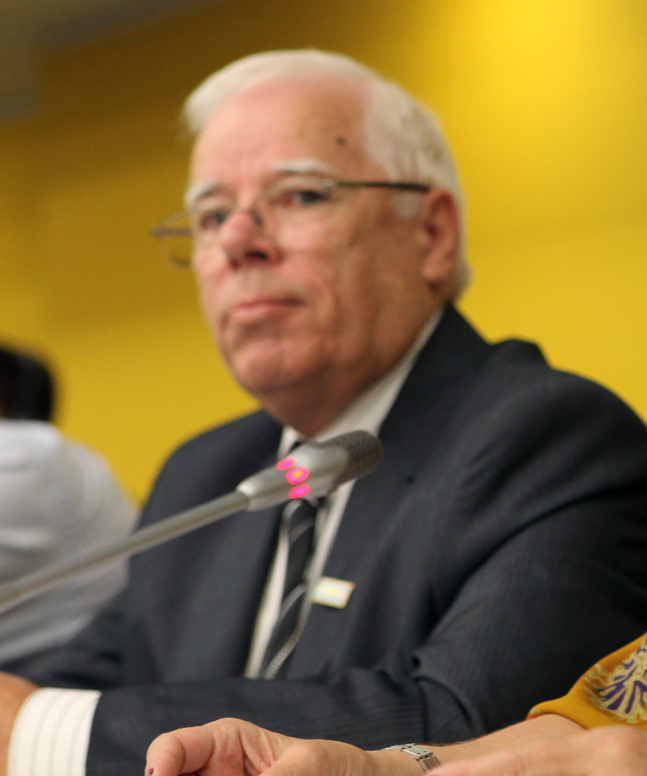
- Alejandro Betts at the meeting of the UN Special Committee on Decolonization in 2011
- Born: Alexander Jacob Betts; 28 October 1947; Stanley, Falkland Islands
- Died: 13 March 2020 (aged 72); Ushuaia, Argentina
- Known for: Campaigning for Argentine sovereignty over the Falkland Islands

Alejandro Jacobo Betts (born Alexander Jacob Betts, 28 October 1947 – 13 March 2020) was a Falklands-born Argentine air-traffic controller and activist who worked with the Argentine government as a technical advisor on the Tierra del Fuego's Malvinas Question Provincial Observatory Advisory Council. Betts supported Argentina's claim to the Falkland Islands and was a controversial figure in the Falklands as a result. Betts also was the older brother of Terry Betts, who served as a member of the Falkland Islands Legislative Council and assisted British forces in the Falklands War. His younger brother Peter served in the British Task Force.

== Early life ==
Betts, a fourth generation Falkland Islander, was born to Cyril Betts and Mally Goss, who ran the Victory Bar in Stanley. The Goss family first arrived in the Falklands in approximately 1841/2, when Jacob Napoleon Goss (great-great-grandfather) and his wife Ann Patrick arrived on board the Alarm. John Betts (great-great-grandfather) arrived on 9 August 1855, following the shipwreck of the Carlton.

Betts has two younger brothers who participated in the Falklands War: Peter, who was a merchant seaman who served with the British task force, and Terry, who was one of the islanders who volunteered to support British forces. After the war Terry was elected to serve in the Falkland Islands Government. Another brother died in infancy as the result of meningitis. He also had two half-brothers and two half-sisters from his father's first marriage.

At the age of fourteen Betts went to train as sheep shearer and later worked for LADE as an air-traffic controller at Port Stanley Airport. Betts' first wife, Candy, died in 1977 at the age of 26. The couple had a son, Paul, born in 1968 and a daughter, Dawn, born in 1969. Betts' second marriage was to Rosita, a Chilean-Falkander, with whom he had two children. When he left the Falklands in 1982, he left his daughter Dawn with Rosita. His son Paul was at school in Argentina, where he still lives and has adopted the name Pablo. Following the Falklands War, Betts divorced Rosita, marrying Santina Toranzo, with whom he had three children. He married his fourth wife Carol Oyola in 2000.

Betts claimed that he began to question British sovereignty over the Falklands when he spoke to an Argentine tourist about the issue in the 1970s. He stated that he started studying the history of the Falkland Islands in 1976 and concluded after two years of research that "Argentina had absolute rights over the island territory". Betts' claim that he had supported Argentine sovereignty over the islands as early as 1976 is disputed. On 18 May 1978 Betts sent a letter to the Falkland Islands Times, strongly protesting against the weak response of the British government to the establishment of an Argentine base on Thule Island. Both of his brothers appear to have been aware of his support for Argentina.

== Falklands War ==
Betts' letter published in the Falkland Islands Times in May 1978

In 1982 the Argentine military government invaded the Falklands and occupied the islands for 74 days, which led to the Falklands War between Argentina and the United Kingdom. Betts left the Falklands a few days after the Argentine surrender, with his wife and children remaining on the islands.

The reasons and circumstances surrounding Betts' departure from the Falklands are disputed. Betts claims he was forced to leave by British forces, with the support of many Falkland Islanders, as a result of his support for Argentina during the war. Islanders were apparently unaware of Betts' claim to support Argentina and suggested he left the Falklands of his own accord, abandoning his wife and their children (and his 13-year-old daughter from his previous marriage), because he was having an extramarital affair with an Argentine who was working on the islands. John Fowler, the former deputy editor of Penguin News, pointed out in an editorial that other islanders who collaborated with the Argentine military during the war suffered no persecution and still live in the islands.

== Life in Argentina ==
After leaving the Falklands, Betts moved to Córdoba Province and married his Argentine partner, Caroline. In 2007 Betts unsuccessfully ran for Mayor of Córdoba.

Betts campaigned in support of Argentine sovereignty over the Falklands, giving evidence at annual meetings of the United Nations Special Committee on Decolonization as part of Argentina's delegation. In 1987, his brother Terry Betts also gave evidence to the committee as a member of the Falkland Islands Government and although they sat together did not speak, he later said that his brother had ″lost touch″ with developments on the islands since the war. Betts was later to criticise his brother's attendance stating:

De todos los encuentros el más interesante fue en 1987; los británicos buscaban restar importancia a lo que yo decía, mis palabras molestaban y la prensa internacional se interesaba por mi postura, los ingleses no tuvieron mejor idea de llevar a mi hermano, Terry Betts al Comité de Descolonización defendiendo los intereses británicos. Of all the meetings the most interesting was in 1987; The British tried to downplay what I was saying, my words annoyed and the international press was interested in my position, the British had no better idea of bringing my brother, Terry Betts, to the Decolonization Committee defending British interests.

In response, John Fowler of The Penguin Times in an editorial replied:

Betts does not mention that during that time his brother Terry was a Councillor in the government of the Islands, democratically elected and defending the interests and rights of the inhabitants of the Islands and not those of the British. Councillors choose which of their own members go to the Committee as part of the British delegation.

In late 2013 Betts was made a technical advisor of the Tierra del Fuego Malvinas Observatory.

In his evidence to the Special Committee's meeting in 2013, Betts caused controversy when he suggested that during the Falkland Islands sovereignty referendum campaign, Peter Willets, an Emeritus Professor of Global Politics from City University London, had his credentials as an official referendum observer removed by the Falkland Islands Government because he stated the referendum result would not be recognised legally. Peter Willets later strongly condemned Betts' comments as a "highly distorted account" and stated that:

"Mr Betts sustains his position in Argentina on the basis of two false claims.

Firstly, he did not start studying Falklands history in 1976 nor conclude after two years of research that, “Argentina had absolute rights over the island territory” (Clarin, “Un malvinense contra Inglaterra”, 22 June 2011).

On 18 May 1978, Mr Betts sent a letter to a local mimeographed news sheet, the Falkland Islands Times, strongly protesting at what he saw as a weak and ineffective response by the British government to the establishment of a small Argentine base on Thule. This was not the action of somebody who had concluded the South Atlantic islands were Argentine.

Secondly, Mr Betts did not leave the Falkland because of any political pressures and he was not expelled from the Falklands. He had more personal reasons. He left his second wife and children in the Islands in January 1982, when he developed a relationship with a young woman who worked with him in the Stanley office of the Argentine airline, LADE. He accompanied her to Argentina, after the Argentine defeat in June 1982.

I object to my activities being misrepresented to sustain Mr Betts' misrepresentation of his own background."

In 2015 Clarín criticised Betts for receiving a war veteran's pension from the Argentine government despite never being a member of the Argentine military and not being an Argentine citizen at the time of the war. Betts responded to the article by pointing out that he had "never denied being an Argentine Malvinas war veteran" and that one of the requisites to collect the veteran's pension is to have been in the Falklands during the war.

The controversy over his treatment of his family led to the Argentine government under President Macri dropping Betts from the Argentine delegation to the UN decolonisation committee in 2018. In addition, according to MercoPress, this was because he was considered "too aggressive for the British delegation and Falklands petitioners". He was criticised for his allegedly querulant behaviour by some sources.

In early 2020 he was diagnosed with spinal cancer and died on 13 March 2020.
