= Janet Robertson =

Argentine-born Falkland Islands politician (2005–2009)

The Honourable Janet Robertson

Member of the Falkland Islands Legislative Assembly for Stanley
- In office 17 November 2005 – 5 November 2009
- Preceded by: Jan Cheek
- Succeeded by: Jan Cheek

Personal details
- Born: 1965 (age 60–61) Río Gallegos, Santa Cruz, Argentina
- Party: Nonpartisan
- Spouse: Joost
- Education: University of Sussex, Atlantic College

Janet Robertson (born 1965 in Río Gallegos, Santa Cruz Province) is an Argentine-born Falkland Islands politician who served as a Member of the Legislative Assembly for the Stanley constituency from 2005 until 2009. Robertson was elected as a Member of the Legislative Council, which was reconstituted into the Legislative Assembly with the implementation of the 2009 Constitution.

Robertson was born in Argentina to Falkland Islander parents in 1965. Her mother, Ana Chiswell (British descent), was born in Buenos Aires and her father was born in the Falklands and had a sheep farm near Río Gallegos. Robertson has a brother, Pablo, born in Río Gallegos and, now, is a pilot of FIGAS.

Her family moved to Port Stephens in the Falklands when she was four, but in 1975 she returned to Argentina where she was educated in Cordoba Province with her brother. She went on to study in Wales at Atlantic College, before gaining a degree in International Relations from the University of Sussex.

She was elected to the Legislative Council at the 2005 general election, but lost her seat four years later in the 2009 general election.
