= Alexander Betts =

Alexander Betts may refer to:

- Alexander Betts (political scientist) (born 1980), British political scientist
- Alejandro Betts (1947–2020), Argentine air traffic controller
