= Stacy Bragger =

Journalist and politician from the Falkland Islands

The Honourable Stacy Bragger MLA

Member of the Falkland Islands Legislative Assembly for Stanley
- Incumbent
- Assumed office 12 December 2025
- In office 9 November 2017 – 24 September 2021
- Preceded by: Jan Cheek
- Succeeded by: Pete Biggs

Personal details
- Born: Stacy John Bragger; 1984 (age 41–42)
- Party: Nonpartisan
- Education: Peter Symonds College, Surrey Institute of Art and Design, University College

Stacy John Bragger (born 1984) is a Falkland Island journalist and politician who served as a Member of the Legislative Assembly for the Stanley constituency from 2017 general election to 2021 and again from the 2025 general election.

== Education and career ==
Bragger grew up in the Falkland Islands before moving to the UK to study at Peter Symonds College and then the Surrey Institute of Art & Design. After returning to the Falklands, Bragger went on to work at Falkland Islands Radio Service, rising to the position of News Editor during which time he worked on the documentary series Falklands 30 which marked the 30th anniversary of the Falklands War and was broadcast on BBC Radio.

In 2012 he represented the Falkland Islands at the Commonwealth Youth Parliament and following the 2013 Falkland Islands sovereignty referendum, Bragger toured Latin American nations with MLA Gavin Short to promote the Islanders' position in the sovereignty dispute. In 2014 Bragger was appointed Executive Secretary for the Falkland Islands Chamber of Commerce.

Bragger has also served as Chairman of the Media Trust, Secretary of the Falkland Islands Overseas Games Association and in 2015 was the General Team Manager for the Falkland Islands at the Island Games in Jersey.
