= Barry Elsby =

Falkland Islands politician

The Honourable Barry Elsby MLA, MD
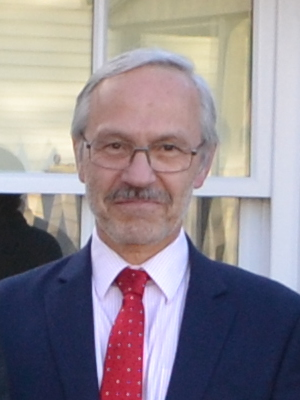

Member of the Falkland Islands Legislative Assembly for Stanley
- In office 15 December 2011 – 4 November 2021
- Preceded by: Emma Edwards
- Succeeded by: Gavin Short

Personal details
- Born: Wales, UK
- Party: Nonpartisan
- Spouse: Bernadette

Barry Elsby is a British born, Falkland Islands doctor and politician, who has served as a Member of the Legislative Assembly for the Stanley constituency since a by-election in 2011 which filled the seat vacated by Emma Edwards. He won re-election in 2013 and 2017.

Elsby first came to the Falklands with his family in 1990, initially on a two-year contract. He works at the King Edward VII Memorial Hospital in Stanley as a general practitioner, specialising in Cancer Research. Before his election to the Legislative Assembly, Elsby was a member of the Media Trust, acting as the Chief Medical Officer on several occasions and was elected by parents to the Board of Education.
