= Mark Pollard =

Falkland Islands politician (born 1979)

The Honourable Mark Pollard MLA

Member of the Falkland Islands Legislative Assembly for Stanley
- In office 9 November 2017 – 31 October 2025
- Preceded by: Mike Summers

Personal details
- Born: Mark John Pollard; 13 October 1979 (age 46)
- Party: Nonpartisan
- Spouse: Cathy Jacobsen

Mark John Pollard (born 13 October 1979) is a Falkland Island politician who served as a Member of the Legislative Assembly for the Stanley constituency from the 2017 general election until 2025.

Born in the UK to a fourth generation Falkland Islander and a Royal Marine who served in the Falklands, Pollard moved to the Islands in 1985. In 1997 he took part in a BBC World Service series to commemorate the 15th anniversary of the Falklands War.

After studying in the UK, Pollard returned to the Falklands and worked in telecommunications for 17 years. He briefly served as Chair of the Falklands Islands Association Sub-Committee.
