= Emma Brook =

Falkland Islands politician (born 1971)

The Honourable Emma Brook

Member of the Falkland Islands Legislative Assembly for Stanley
- In office 5 November 2009 – 21 October 2011
- Preceded by: Richard Cockwell
- Succeeded by: Barry Elsby

Personal details
- Born: 13 January 1971 (age 55) Portsmouth, England
- Party: Nonpartisan
- Education: Queen's University Belfast, Aberdeen University, University of Exeter

Emma Jane Brook (born 26 September 1971, née Edwards) is a British born, Falkland Islands teacher and politician, who served as a Member of the Legislative Assembly for the Stanley constituency from her election in 2009 until she resigned in 2011. She is the eldest daughter of another MLA, Roger Edwards.

Edwards was born in Portsmouth, England to Norma (a Falkland Islander) and Roger Edwards. She first went to the Falklands at the age of two when her father was stationed aboard HMS Endurance. Edwards was educated in Stanley, but in 1988 she moved to Winchester to undertake A-Levels and in 1995 she graduated from Queen's University Belfast with a degree in Geology.

After working for some years as a junior geologist for the Falkland Islands Government, Edwards went to Aberdeen University in 1998 where she gained a master's degree in Petroleum Geology. She then worked for the Falkland Islands Development Corporation and Cable & Wireless before returning to the UK in 2004 where she went to the University of Exeter to retrain as a school teacher.

In November 2009 she was elected to the Legislative Assembly for Stanley, and in June 2010 she represented the Falklands at the annual meeting of the UN Special Committee on Decolonisation in New York City.

Edwards is a reserve Police Constable in the Royal Falkland Islands Police and her portfolios as an MLA included Tourism, Minerals, Housing and Environment and Heritage. She announced her resignation from the Legislative Assembly in 2011, following her decision to marry Mark Brook. Her seat was filled in a by-election on 15 December 2011, won by Barry Elsby.
