= Speaker of the Legislative Assembly of the Falkland Islands =

The speaker of the Legislative Assembly is the presiding officer of the Legislative Assembly of the Falkland Islands. The speaker also administers the oaths of office and allegiance.

The Legislative Council (established in 1845) was presided over by the governor until 2002 when the office of speaker was created. In 2009 the new Constitution of the Falkland Islands replaced the Legislative Council with the Legislative Assembly and also laid out the election, powers and role of the speaker.

The speaker is elected by the Members of the Legislative Assembly (MLAs) at the first meeting of the Assembly after an election. Unlike the speaker of the House of Commons, the speaker of the Legislative Assembly does not need to be a member of the Assembly, although the speaker must be eligible to stand as a MLA. The MLAs also elect a deputy speaker, in the same manner as the speaker, who acts as presiding officer in the absence of the speaker.

The speaker and the deputy speaker are elected for the life of the Legislative Assembly although they can be removed by a motion of no confidence supported by at least six of the eight elected MLAs. During the speaker election, the attorney general acts as presiding officer.

== List of office-holders ==
Name	Entered office	Left office
None (The Governor of the Falkland Islands)	1845	2002
Hon. Lionel Geoffrey 'Tim' Blake, OBE, JP	2002	2005
Hon. Darwin Lewis Clifton, OBE	November 2005	February 2009
Hon. Keith Biles, OBE JP	27 February 2009	Present
