= Jan Cheek =

Falkland Islands politician (born 1948)

The Honourable Jan Cheek MBE
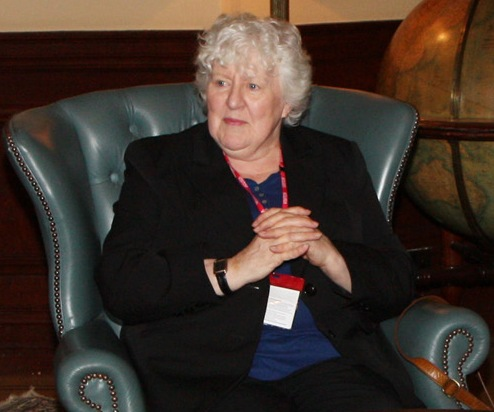

Member of the Falkland Islands Legislative Assembly for Stanley
- In office 5 November 2009 – 9 November 2017
- Preceded by: Janet Robertson
- Succeeded by: Stacy Bragger

Member of the Falkland Islands Legislative Council for Stanley
- In office 9 October 1997 – 17 November 2005
- Preceded by: Wendy Teggart
- Succeeded by: Janet Robertson

Personal details
- Born: Janet Lynda Biggs; February 1948 (age 78) Stanley, Falkland Islands
- Party: Nonpartisan
- Spouse: John (died 1996)
- Children: Miranda and Ros

Janet Lynda Cheek MBE (née Biggs; born February 1948) is a Falkland Islands politician who served as a Member of the Legislative Assembly for the Stanley constituency from 2009 to 2017. She was previously a Member of the Legislative Council from 1997 to 2005.

== Early life and education ==
Jan Cheek was born in Stanley, the oldest child of Basil Biggs and Betty Rowlands. She was a sixth-generation Falkland Islander and was the oldest of three siblings. She spent much of her childhood in South Georgia after her father was appointed policeman and handyman for the island. For her A-Levels she was awarded a government scholarship to a study at a grammar school in Dorset.

== Career ==
In 1995, Cheek became a Trustee for the South Georgia Whaling Museum and later joined the board of Trustees for the South Georgia Heritage Trust. Cheek was a member of the Falkland Island Legislative Council, representing Stanley between 1997 and 2005. She served as a Member of the Legislative Assembly, also for the Stanley constituency, beginning in 2009. Cheek won re-election in 2013 but stepped down from the assembly at the 2017 election.

Cheek worked as a Secondary School English teacher from 1969 until 1989. She then moved to Fortuna Ltd. where she rose to become co-owner and director until her retirement in 2008. Cheek is the owner of the Volunteer Point nature reserve.

She was appointed Member of the Order of the British Empire (MBE) in the 2019 Birthday Honours for services to the Falkland Islands.

== Personal life ==
Cheek married fellow islander John Cheek (1939–1996) in 1968, with whom she had two children, Miranda and Rosalind. She then became a grandmother to Hamish (2004), Flora(2005) and Tom(2011). Following John's death in 1996, Cheek became a Trustee of the John Cheek Trust.
