= Peter Biggs (special effects artist) =

Peter Biggs was the senior special effects technician for the film Who Framed Roger Rabbit and a number of Hollywood films during the 1980s.

== Filmography ==
- A Kiss Before Dying (1991) – Special effects technician
- Who Framed Roger Rabbit (1988) – Senior special effects
- Amsterdamned (1988)
- Labyrinth (1986) – Special effects technician
- Supergirl (1984) – Special effects technician
- Krull (1983) – Special effects technician
- Superman (1978) – Special effects technician
- The Man with the Golden Gun (1974)
- Live and Let Die (1973)
- Alice's Adventures in Wonderland (1972)
- 2001: A Space Odyssey (1965)
