= Lewis Clifton =

Falkland Islands politician (born 1956)

Lewis Clifton MLA
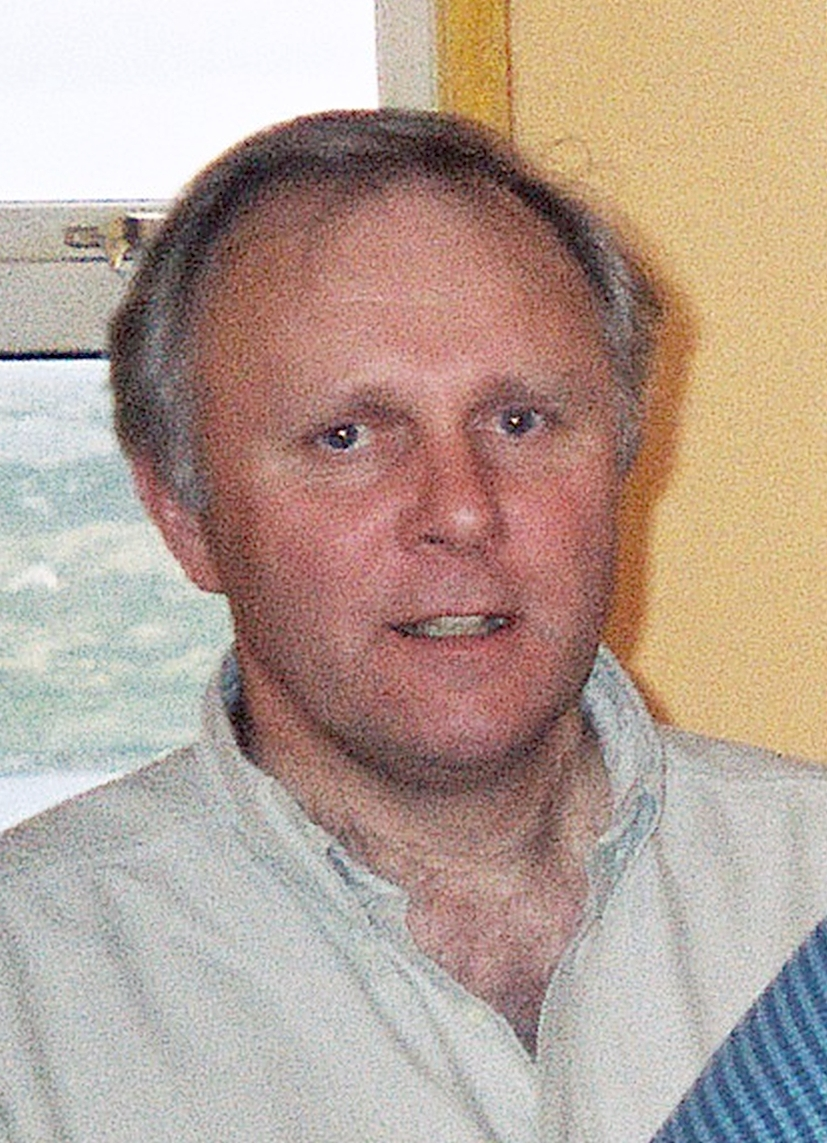
- Clifton in 2003

Member of the Falkland Islands Legislative Assembly for Stanley
- Incumbent
- Assumed office 12 December 2025

Speaker of the Legislative Assembly of the Falkland Islands
- In office November 2005 – 4 February 2009
- Monarch: Elizabeth II
- Governor: Howard Pearce; Alan Huckle
- Preceded by: Tim Blake
- Succeeded by: Keith Biles

Member of the Falkland Islands Legislative Council for Stanley
- In office 9 October 1997 – 22 November 2001
- In office 3 October 1985 – 12 October 1989

Personal details
- Born: Darwin Lewis Clifton; May 1956 (age 70)

Darwin Lewis Clifton OBE (born May 1956) is a Falkland Islands politician. He has served as a member of the Falkland Islands Legislative Assembly for Stanley since 2025.

Clifton previously served as Speaker of the Legislative Assembly of the Falkland Islands from 2005 to 2009, when he resigned after being fined for insider trading.

Political offices
Preceded by Tim Blake	Speaker of the Legislative Assembly of the Falkland Islands; 2005–2009	Succeeded by Keith Biles
