= Falkland Islands English =

Variety of the English language spoken in the Falkland Islands

- Native to: United Kingdom
- Region: Falkland Islands
- Ethnicity: Falkland islanders
- Native speakers: 1,700
- Language family: Indo-European: Germanic; West Germanic; North Sea Germanic; Anglo-Frisian; Anglic; English; Falkland Islands English
- Early forms: Old English: Middle English; 19th century British English

Language codes
- ISO 639-3: –
- Glottolog: None
- IETF: en-FK

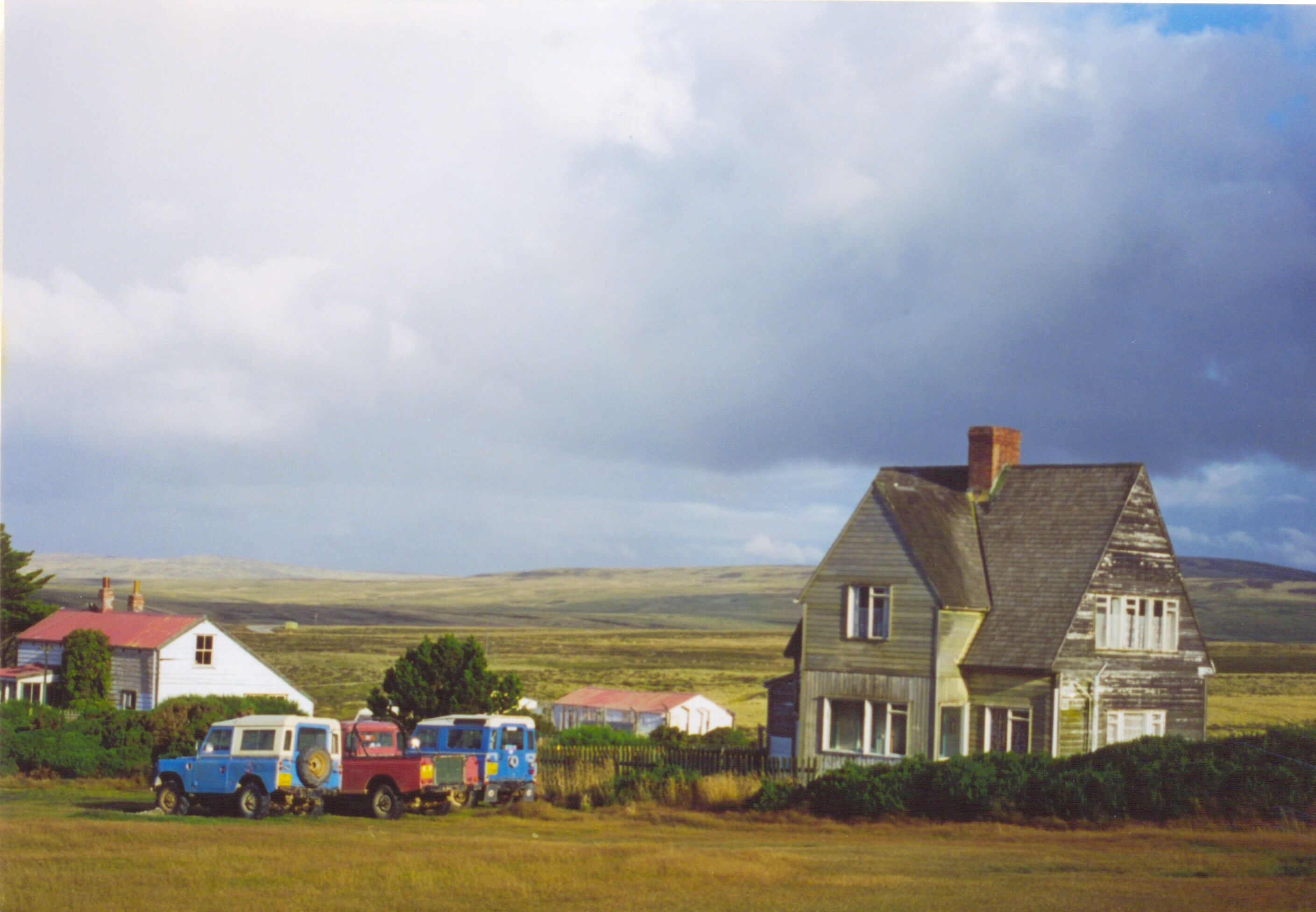
A "Camp" settlement.

Map of the Falkland Islands

Falkland Islands English is a dialect of the English language spoken in the Falkland Islands. It is mainly derived from varieties of English spoken in Southern England and retains many similarities with them. However, it also shares certain features with other Southern Hemisphere varieties of English, and Falklanders visiting the UK are sometimes mistaken for Australians or New Zealanders. The dialect persists despite the arrival of many immigrants from the United Kingdom in recent years. In rural areas (i.e. anywhere outside Stanley), known as 'Camp' (from Spanish campo or 'countryside'), the Falkland accent tends to be stronger.

== Settlement history ==
The Falkland Islands, a cluster of 780 islands, that are 300 miles from the eastern coast of Argentina, had no indigenous population when the British arrived to explore the islands in 1690. Continuous anglophone settlement of the islands dates only to 1833, when British forces removed 26 Argentinian soldiers from the islands and claimed them for Britain. In 1845, the capital town of Stanley, located on East Falkland, was established. Argentina also has a claim to the islands, and in 1982, Argentine forces invaded the Falkland Islands. The United Kingdom moved to defend the British control of the islands, with Prime Minister Margaret Thatcher calling the islanders "of British tradition and stock". In under three months, nearly a thousand people were killed, and over 2,000 were injured in the war. For much of the 19th century, the Falklands had a transient population with much turnover as individuals came and went from the islands and a frontier mentality. As well as official settlement from the United Kingdom, shipwrecked and absconded sailors formed a significant part of the population and South American gauchos worked on the land, which housed large numbers of feral cattle. From 1852, sheep farming became a significant industry on the island.

British–Argentinian tension regarding claim to the islands still exists, but the identity of the island overall is British, as shown when over 99.8% of islanders voted to remain under British sovereignty in a referendum. Immigration to the islands from the United Kingdom, Chile and the British territory of Saint Helena is frequent, and the population was 55% local-born in 2006. Over 85% of the current population live in the capital, Stanley.

=== Formation of Falkland Islands English ===
According to linguist Anne Sudbury, Falkland Islands English is, alongside New Zealand English, probably the youngest native speaker variety of English. The origins of the dialect present an unusual example of what Sudbury terms "pure dialect contact", where, despite the presence of some Scandinavian and Spanish sailors and a possible small influence from Scots Gaelic in the 19th century, the dialect was formed almost exclusively from contact between native speakers of English. There was also a transient presence of South American gauchos from Uruguay and Chile in the 19th century, however, very few of these became permanent residents of the island and their influence was limited to the lexicon of Falklands English, having no noticeable effect on its grammar and phonology.

The geographical origins of the British settlers to the islands, and therefore the dialects of English they spoke, are hard to trace, due to a lack of detailed historical records. This problem is further complicated by the transient nature of many settlers' stays in the islands; settlers often found the conditions on the islands harsh and returned home, whereas others migrated onwards to Patagonia. Still more residents were employed as temporary workers on two- to five-year contracts, many of whom chose to return to the UK upon the contract's completion.

However, the partial records that do exist, tend to suggest that the two areas providing most settlers were the West Country and the Scottish Highlands and Islands. The principal varieties of English involved in the formation of Falkland Islands English are likely to be West Country English and other dialects of Southern English. As well as these two varieties, it is probable that West Highland English was spoken by settlers, although, despite the fact Gaelic was only spoken on the islands for a generation, the highland settlers may have been Gaelic monolinguals upon arrival.

In addition to these non-standard varieties, until land reforms in the 1970s, the wealthier strata of Falklands society, landowners and later farm managers, were typically speakers of RP or near-RP, as were the government officials present on the islands. Due to the small population, these individuals were less socially separated from the majority of the population than in other English-speaking regions, and so influenced the emerging variety.

This dialect contact resulted in a process of koineisation, by which speakers of various dialects accommodated to each other by mixing and levelling their speech to produce a new variety of English. Until 1982, there is evidence that separate accents existed on West and East Falkland, which were themselves different from the accent of Stanley. However, by 2000, Sudbury reports there was no noticeable difference in accent between regions of the islands.

== Relationship to other varieties of English ==
Falkland Islands English can be differentiated from other varieties of English. However, it shows considerable variation between speakers and even the same speaker will often realise the same word with several different pronunciations. Sudbury suggests that this demonstrates that FIE was not yet, as of 2001, a fully focused variety and was still in the second stage of the koineisation process, where a large degree of variability in the dialect can be found.

Despite this lack of consistency, Falkland Islands English is clearly a variety based on Southern British English, like the other southern hemisphere varieties of English: Australian English, New Zealand English and South African English. People from the British Isles frequently identify the Falklands accent as sounding similar to Australasian accents, although in some respects, particularly in the production of the vowel found in the word "mouth", it is closer to the accents of southwestern England. This difference in the pronunciation of the MOUTH vowel in part reflects the fact that the majority of settlers in Australia and New Zealand came from the southeast rather than the southwest of England.

One salient feature that FIE shares with Australian English is the prevalence of high rising terminal in statements as well as questions, which is much less common in British English. In addition to this, h-dropping is rare, the vowel in "nurse" is fronted and rounded, words rhyming with "own" are pronounced with two syllables and the glide in "mouth" and "price" is weakened to nearly a monophthong. These features, alongside the comparative lack of non-standard grammar, are shared between FIE and the Australasian varieties.

However, other features differ from the southern hemisphere varieties. These include a lack of raising of front vowels a non-open opening vowel in "face" and the absence of a diphthong in words that rhyme with "fleece" and "goose".

Based on these factors, Andrea Sudbury concludes that FIE is typologically a southern hemisphere variety of English, albeit a somewhat peripheral one.

== Phonetics and phonology ==
=== Vowels ===
==== Front vowels ====
The front monophthongs in Falklands English are very similar to standard Southern British English. The TRAP vowel is realised as [æ], the DRESS vowel is [ɛ] and KIT is commonly [ɪ]. Although some speakers do occasionally raise these vowels somewhat, they do not approach the degree of raising found in Australia and New Zealand.

==== FOOT and STRUT ====
Words in the FOOT and STRUT sets are also broadly similar to Southern British English, being realised as [ʊ] and [ʌ]. However, some speakers use fronted and unrounded variants, [ɨ]-[ɯ], for the FOOT set, especially in common words like good and could. Sudbury also noted a tendency to front the STRUT vowel to [ɐ], a feature which parallels South African and Australian English.

==== CLOTH and LOT ====
Words in the CLOTH and LOT lexical sets are generally pronounced as an open back rounded vowel, [ɒ]. There are some exceptions to this in the CLOTH set, where words like off, often and across may be raised and lengthened to [ɔː]. The subset of CLOTH where this occurs matches the lexical items which can be raised and lengthened in Australian and New Zealand English.

==== BATH, START and PALM ====
Words in the BATH, START and PALM sets are generally pronounced similarly to Australasian Englishes, as a lengthened unrounded open front vowel [aː]. However, some speakers use use backer versions, sometimes arriving at articulations similar to RP [ɑː].

Some words which Southern British English places in the BATH set are occasionally realised with the TRAP vowel by some speakers. These include last, past, after, half and asked.

==== NURSE ====
The vowel in the NURSE lexical set can be realised as in standard Southern British English, as [ɜː], or raised, fronted and lip-rounded to [øː]~[œː]. The latter variant is similar to Australasian varieties, implying that raising, fronting and rounding of NURSE is a common Southern Hemisphere innovation.

==== FLEECE ====
The vowel in FLEECE is realised [iː] as in Southern British English. Unlike in Australasia, diphthongisation is rare.

==== THOUGHT ====
The THOUGHT vowel is pronounced similarly to in most of Britain, as [ɔː]. Diphthongisation to [ɔə~oɐ], a typical feature in Australia and New Zealand, is very rare.

==== GOOSE ====
The GOOSE vowel /uː/ can be slightly fronted to [ʉː].

==== Diphthongs ====
Falklands English has undergone a degree of diphthongisation, albeit to a lesser degree than Australasian Englishes.

One major difference between the English of the Falklands and other Englishes of the southern hemisphere is the onset centralisation of the PRICE vowel /aɪ/, in which PRICE is pronounced [prəɪs] or [prʌɪs]. This appears to be the retention of a conservative pronunciation from West Country English, rather than an innovation.

The vowel in GOAT may be resemble RP [əʊ], be backed to [ʌʊ] or realised as a backer and closer [ɤʊ].

Although the NEAR and SQUARE sets are usually pronounced [ɪə] and [eə] respectively, some speakers appear to show a merger of both sets to [eə].

=== Consonants ===
English in the Falklands is non-rhotic. This is consistent with other varieties of English in the southern hemisphere.

As in Australia, Falklanders will often insert an extra schwa in words ending -OWN and -EWN, adding another syllable to the word. So, in the case of BLOWN, Standard English /bləʊn/ becomes FIE [bləʊən].

In the word WITH, the final -th sound might be devoiced so it is pronounced [θ] (as in "thing") rather than [ð] (as in "this"). This is paralleled in Scottish English and the feature is likely attributable to the presence of Scottish immigrants in the Falklands.

Glottalisation of /t/ is increasingly common in non-word initial contexts.

=== Intonation ===
Falkland Islands English makes regular use of high rising terminals, where the rising intonation usually found in questions is used in declarative assertions. This feature is more common among younger speakers and women.

== Grammar ==
Alongside other Southern Hemisphere varieties of English, Falkland Island English is comparatively close to standard English in its grammar. However, some non-standard forms are found occasionally among speakers.

=== Pronouns ===
Falklanders will sometimes use the second person plural pronoun youse, instead of "you" when referring to more than one interlocutor. This is also found in New Zealand and Australia, alongside other regions influenced by Hiberno-English.

The pronouns she/her are sometimes used with inanimate objects rather than standard it/it.

In coordinate subjects, the words me or myself will often replace standard I. So standard granny and I becomes FIE me and granny or myself and granny.

The reflexive pronouns can be regularised both in possessive form and number. So himself > hisself and ourselves > ourself.

As in many varieties of English, the first person possessive my can be replaced with the object pronoun me (e.g. I broke me leg).

Non-standard uses of us are also recorded. It can be used as a singular object pronoun where standard English would use me (e.g. I was the only one there, so he hit us!). In addition to this, us can be used as an identifier with a noun phrase (e.g. Us chays remember very well what happened in 1982.)

=== Noun phrase ===
==== Plurals ====
Group plurals are sometimes used, where the plural marker -s is added not only to the head of the phrase but to the last word. For example, standard a few cans of beer might become FIE a few cans of beers.

Plural markers are not used after quantifiers with units of measurement (e.g. That cost me seventy pound and it's only 3 gallon).

==== Determiners ====
Falkland Islanders frequently drop the definite article in abbreviations, where it would always be present in British English. This is particularly evident with the phrase "the UK", which in Falkland Island English is almost always produced as simply "UK" (e.g. I had to study in [Ø] UK.) This feature is also found in ex-pat varieties of English spoken in Hong Kong and on the Costa del Sol.

It is also common to replace the demonstrative "those" with "them" ( e.g. Them Argies got thrown off Goose Green double quick).

Occasionally, speakers use a rather than an when the following noun or adjective begins with a vowel. This means standard English an eye becomes a eye whereas an old car may be produced as a old car.

=== Adjectives ===
Several non-standard features are found in comparative and superlative structures. Double comparative and superlative forms are sometimes found; for example it was more colder and he was the most strangest man I ever met. In addition to this, Falkland Islanders sometimes overuse both synthetic marking of comparatives (it was expensiver than I thought) and analytic marking of comparatives (her parents are more old).

=== Verbs ===
==== Habitual aspect ====
In Falkland Island English, speakers may use -s on the verb to indicate a habitual aspect, for example "they goes wherever they wants".

==== There is/there are ====
As in many dialects of English, there is can be followed by the plural.

A structure with there is/was + [noun] + [past participle] is used to illustrate resultative contexts. Examples of this might be "there was a fella shot here during the war" or "there's houses knocked down every other year".

==== Past simple and perfect tenses ====
As in Australian English, FIE sometimes generalises was to all persons and numbers. This means phrases such as "you was angry" and "there was three johnny rooks" are possible. Although the opposite phenomenon, generalisation of were to all persons and numbers (e.g. I were hungry), has been noted, it is exceptionally rare.

Falkland Islanders often produce non-standard past simple and past participle forms. This can consist of regularisation of irregular verbs, generalisation of the past participle form to past simple, generalisation of the past simple to the past participle, and use of an unmarked verb as a past form with some verbs.

Non-standard past verb forms in Falklands English (from Britain and Sudbury, 2022)
Non-standard variant	Example
Regularisation of irregular verb	She bended it right round the wall and into the top corner.
Extension of past participle form to past simple	I seen this army land rover coming up the road... turned out it was full of Argentinians.
Extension of past simple form to past participle	I wasn't hungry, like. I'd ate.
Use of unmarked verb in context where past simple or past participle form would be expected.	I felt sorry for him, so I give him back his 50 quid.

==== Obligation ====
Falkland Islanders frequently use non-standard got to instead of standard have got to, have to or must to express obligation. This feature is common in Southwestern England and is likely a reflection of the West Country origins of many early settlers.

=== Negation ===
Speakers may employ double negatives and ain't can be used as the negative form of have and be. The was/weren't split is also found, where was can be used in all persons of the verb, but weren't is retained for situations where contrast is required. Speakers often use never to mark negation in the past simple tense and may generalise don't to all persons of the verb in the present simple.

Non-standard negation forms in Falklands English (from Britain and Sudbury, 2022)
Non-standard variant	Example
Use of ain't as negative form of be	He ain't in the house.
Use of ain't as negative form of have	They ain't seen nobody all day.
Double negative	They ain't seen nobody all day..
Use of never as a preverbal negator in the simple past.	I never fixed the fence when I was over there.
Use of don't with all persons.	He don't live in Stanley no more.

=== Conjunctions ===
- Speakers may use what as a relative pronoun in situations where standard English would use that, who or which. e.g. There's a door what opens onto the street.
- Defining relative pronouns may be deleted. e.g. There was a fella came here to study the penguins.
- It is possible to use but at the end of a phrase in the way though may be used in standard English. e.g. I was tired, but.
- Like can be used as a focussing device. e.g. It was chilly in London like, but not how it gets here when it's cold.

== Vocabulary ==
The Falkland Islands had no native population prior to European settlement, and so did not develop the strata of loanwords relating to flora and fauna borrowed from indigenous languages which are found in Australian and New Zealand English.

However, the Falklands English vernacular has some borrowed Spanish words due to contact with mainland South America and the influence of Spanish-speaking gauchos who worked on the islands. In addition to this, Falklanders use some vocabulary derived from jargon used by the British Armed forces, as well as sharing some words with southern hemisphere varieties.

=== Spanish loanwords ===
In the corpus of Falklands English, a significant number of Spanish loanwords are detectable. Spanish loanwords are generally "Falklandised", and employ pronunciations that no longer resemble their Rioplatense Spanish origins. For example, rebenque ("whip") is pronounced in the Falklands as [rəvInki] rather than Spanish [reβenke], and arroyo ("stream") is pronounced as [rəʊʒə] instead of [aroʒo]. The Spanish word "campo", meaning "field" or "countryside", became Falklands English "camp", which is used on the islands to describe areas outside of the capital Port Stanley. Another Spanish phrase connected to rural life and borrowed into Falklands English is passar libre, meaning "cattle grid".

Other loanwords include interjections such as 'che', also encountered in Rioplatense Spanish, and 'poocha', equivalent to 'wow' or 'damn', (from pucha, a euphemism for puta or 'whore').

Spanish borrowings are dominant in the local horse-related terminology. For instance, the Islanders use 'alizan', 'colorao', 'negro', 'blanco', 'gotiao', 'picasso', 'sarco', 'rabincana' etc. for certain horse colours and looks, or 'bosal', 'cabresta', 'bastos', 'cinch', 'conjinilla', 'meletas', 'tientas', 'manares' etc. for various items of horse gear.

==== Che ====
"Che" (which may be spelled chay, chey or ché) is used more frequently by older people, and serves as an identity marker to show belonging to the Falkland Islands. It can roughly be translated as "mate" or "love" in British English, but can also be an interjection equivalent to hey! or I say!. Its use forms part of a gaucho sprachbund that covers southern Brazil, Uruguay, parts of Paraguay, Chilean Patagonia,the Falklands and especially Argentina. However, its use in Falklands English differs from that of Spanish and Portuguese in that it can be used as a noun or sometimes a name for an animal.

Differences in use of che between Falklands English and Rioplatense Spanish
	Falklands English	Rioplatense Spanish
Noun of address	Alright ché, how you been?	¡Che! ¿Que onda? (English:How's it going mate?)
Interjection	Ché, what a bloody mess!	¡Che, que pelotudez! (English:My word, how ridiculous!)
Demonym	It's good to have a beer with the old chays! (Standard English:It's good to have a drink with my old Falklands friends!)	Not possible
Proper noun	With reference to a dog: Our Chay don't half like chasing rabbits!	Not possible

==== Toponymy ====
Unlike the older English, French and Spanish place names given by mariners, which refer mainly to islands, rocks, bays, coves, and capes (points), the post-1833 Spanish names usually identify inland geographical locations and features, reflecting the new practical necessity for orientation, land delimitation and management in the cattle and sheep farming. Among the typical such names or descriptive and generic parts of names are 'Rincon Grande', 'Ceritos', 'Campito', 'Cantera', 'Terra Motas', 'Malo River', 'Brasse Mar', 'Dos Lomas', 'Torcida Point', 'Pioja Point', 'Estancia', 'Oroqueta', 'Piedra Sola', 'Laguna Seco', 'Manada', etc. Again, these toponyms are often highly anglicised, for example the place name Tranquilidad, which in Spanish is pronounced [trankilidað̞], is pronounced on the Falklands as [trɪŋkəliːdaː].

=== Island English terms ===
Two notable Falkland Island terms are 'kelper' meaning a Falkland Islander, from the kelp surrounding the islands (sometimes used pejoratively in Argentina), and 'smoko', for a smoking break (as in Australia and New Zealand).

Through the influence of the British forces personnel, who have been stationed continuously in the islands since the Argentine invasion, military expressions are commonly used in Falkland Islands English. An example of this is the term R&R, which is an abbreviation of Rest and Recreation, but among island civilians means "a short break".

Falkland Islanders use the term Johnny rook to refer to the striated caracara, this probably derives from "johnny penguin" an alternate name from the gentoo penguin.

== See also ==
- Commonwealth English
