= Chileans in the Falkland Islands =

Total population
- 133 (4.6%)

Languages
- Spanish (Chilean Spanish); English (Falkland Islands English)

Religion
- Predominantly Roman Catholic, and Protestants

Related ethnic groups
- Chilean people • Falkland Islanders • British Chilean • Chileans in the United Kingdom

Chileans in the Falkland Islands are people of Chilean ancestry or nationality who live in the Falkland Islands. They form the largest community coming from mainland South America, and it was the groups with the largest absolute decreases compared to 2016 on the islands, accounting for over 4.6% of the total population according to the 2021 census. However, the actual number of Chileans living in the Falkland Islands may be slightly higher as some individuals of Chilean origin may have identified themselves as "Falkland Islander".

== History ==
A Chilean consulate was established on the Falklands in the 1870s and remained well into the 20th century. The first Chileans to arrive on the Falklands in large numbers came in the late 1970s, mainly from Punta Arenas and other parts of the Magallanes Region, with 28 permanent Chilean residents listed in the 1980 census. Following the Falklands War in 1982, Argentine nationals were banned from visiting the Falklands until the 1990s, which led to many Chileans (whose government had supported the UK during the war) moving to the Falklands to take up jobs previously held by Argentines. The permanent Chilean population remained fairly stable until the start of the 21st century when Chileans remaining on the islands for longer than 6 years rose to over 100. In census 2012 census, there were 161 Chilean residents (82 women and 79 men) in Stanley and Camp, representing 6% of the civilian population, with an addition 20 Chileans listed as working at RAF Mount Pleasant, bringing the total number to 181 (6.2% of the total population).

According to the 2021 Census, there were 168 Chilean-born residents in the Falkland Islands, representing approximately 4.6% of the total usually resident population of 3,662 people. This marked a decrease from 181 Chilean-born residents (6.2% of the population) recorded in the 2012 Census and 199 in 2016.

The 2006 census indicated that about 157 Islanders had Chilean ancestry, nine were British Chilean, ten were of Falkland Islands-Chilean ancestry, there was one of Brazilian Chilean ancestry and another was Spanish Chilean.

== Population ==
The population speaks Chilean Spanish and Falkland Islands English, and they sometimes speak Spanglish, and are prominently Roman Catholic. Most reside in Stanley, with a small number living in Camp and RAF Mount Pleasant. The influence of the Chileans can be felt in the local food with some bars serving typical Chilean cuisine and the islands receive most Chilean TV channels. Chilean Independence Day is also celebrated on the Falklands and since 2010 festivities have taken place with the Governor at Government House.

The main link between the Falklands and Chile is the weekly LATAM Airlines between RAF Mount Pleasant, Punta Arenas and Santiago de Chile. The flights have been stopped for periods, most notably in 1999 when the Chilean Government banned the flight in protest to the UK's indictment and arrest of Augusto Pinochet. The weekly flight is also the only link between the islands and mainland South America and has become increasingly important since 2011 when the members of Mercosur banned Falklands flagged vessels from entering their ports in support of Argentine's claim to the islands. In 2011 Argentine President Cristina Fernandez de Kirchner threatened to ban flights to the Falklands from flying over Argentine airspace, which led to protests by Chileans in the islands and Chile itself against Kirchner's proposals.

Chileans who have lived on the islands for more than seven years are entitled to apply for Falkland Islands status, considered to be the closest thing to citizenship that the Falkland Islands can grant, giving them full residency rights - although in order to vote they need to hold British, Irish or Commonwealth citizenship. Although the current Chilean government supports Argentine's sovereignty claim to the Falklands, the majority of the Chilean population in the Falklands support the Falkland Islanders' right to self-determination and in 2017 the Chilean-born Leona Vidal Roberts was elected to the Falkland Islands Legislative Assembly.

Chilean immigration to the Falklands 1980–2012
Year	Chilean Residents	Percentage of total population
1980	28▲	1.5
1986	36▲	1.9
1991	43▲	2.1
1996	42▼	1.6
2001	55▲	1.9
2006	136▲	4.6
2012	181▲	6.2
2016	199▲	6
2021	133▼	4.3

== See also ==
- Chileans in the United Kingdom
- Demographics of the Falkland Islands
