= Pete Biggs =

Falkland Island politician

The Honourable Pete Biggs MLA

Member of the Falkland Islands Legislative Assembly for Stanley
- In office 4 November 2021 – 31 October 2025
- Preceded by: Stacy Bragger

Personal details
- Born: Peter Julian Basil Biggs
- Party: Nonpartisan

Peter Julian Basil Biggs is a Falkland Island politician who served as a Member of the Legislative Assembly for the Stanley constituency from the 2021 general election until 2025.
