= Leona Vidal =

Falkland Islands curator and politician (born 1972)

The Honourable Leona Vidal MLA

Member of the Falkland Islands Legislative Assembly for Stanley
- In office 9 November 2017 – 31 October 2025
- Preceded by: Gavin Short

Personal details
- Born: Leona Lucila Vidal; 1972 (age 53–54) Punta Arenas, Chile
- Party: Nonpartisan
- Children: 2
- Parent: Eileen Vidal (mother)
- Education: Stradbroke College
- Occupation: Curator; radio broadcaster

Leona Lucila Vidal (married name Vidal-Roberts; born 1972) is a Falkland Islands curator, radio broadcaster and politician. Vidal served as a Member of the Legislative Assembly for the Stanley constituency from the 2017 general election until 2025.

== Biography ==
Vidal was born in 1972 in Punta Arenas, Chile to a Nelson Vidal and Eileen Vidal. Vidal's father was Chilean and had immigrated to the Falkland Islands in the 1960s, whilst her mother was a fifth generation Falkland Islander. The family returned to the Falklands when Vidal was three years old.

Educated at Stanley Senior School, Vidal later studied journalism at Stradbroke College. Vidal first worked at Penguin News. In 1994, Vidal began working at the Government Printing Office.

Vidal previously served as Director and Manager of the Falkland Islands Museum and National Trust, and has been the host of Children’s Corner on the Falkland Islands Radio Service.

== Personal life ==
In 1981, Vidal became a British citizen. Vidal is married and has two (Note: Also cited as three.) children.
