= Teslyn Barkman =

Falklander journalist and politician

The Honourable Teslyn Barkman

Member of the Falkland Islands Legislative Assembly for Camp
- In office 9 November 2017 – 31 October 2025
- Preceded by: Phyl Rendell

Personal details
- Born: 17 November 1987 (age 38) Stanley, Falkland Islands
- Party: Nonpartisan

Teslyn Siobhan Barkman (born 17 November 1987) is a Falkland Island journalist and politician who served as a Member of the Legislative Assembly for the Camp constituency since the 2017 general election until 2025. Prior to entering politics, she was a journalist for Penguin News.

== Career ==
While working for Penguin News, she expressed concern about plans for Members of the Legislative Assembly to earn a full-time wage of £40,000, arguing that it was too high and would not attract suitable candidates. In 2013, she was part of a delegation that travelled to the United States to lobby the United States Congress to recognise the results of the 2013 Falkland Islands sovereignty referendum. Later that year, she stood for election in the 2013 Falkland Islands general election being one of the youngest candidates standing and the only one under 30. However, she failed to win a seat in the Stanley constituency, finishing sixth in the poll.

In 2014 she started work at the Public Relations and Media Office for Falkland Islands Government. Following this, in 2017, she stood for election to the Legislative Assembly of the Falkland Islands again, this time standing in the Camp constituency. She won a seat in the Legislative Assembly at the 2017 Falkland Islands general election by gathering the second largest number of votes in the Camp constituency and also became the youngest ever woman to be elected to the assembly, at 29.

=== Citizenship controversy ===
In 2022, Barkman applied for and received a New Zealand passport which she was entitled to due to her New Zealand born father. Questions were raised as the Constitution of the Falkland Islands disqualifies anyone from being an MLA or voting in the Falkland Islands if they are: "by virtue of his or her own act, under any acknowledgement of allegiance, obedience or adherence to a foreign Power or State.". She received notice from the Falkland Islands registry service that due to the fact she had obtained New Zealand citizenship by her own action, she was disqualified from voting or being an MLA. Barkman sued the Attorney General of the Falkland Islands and was permitted to retain her seat while the matter was being adjudicated. The case was heard by the Falkland Islands Supreme Court in 2023. The court ruled that Commonwealth nations as of 2008 were not considered "foreign powers" in law, thus Barkman was allowed to remain in office. She did not stand in the 2025 Falkland Islands general election.
