= Falkland Islanders =

People of the British overseas territory of the Falkland Islands

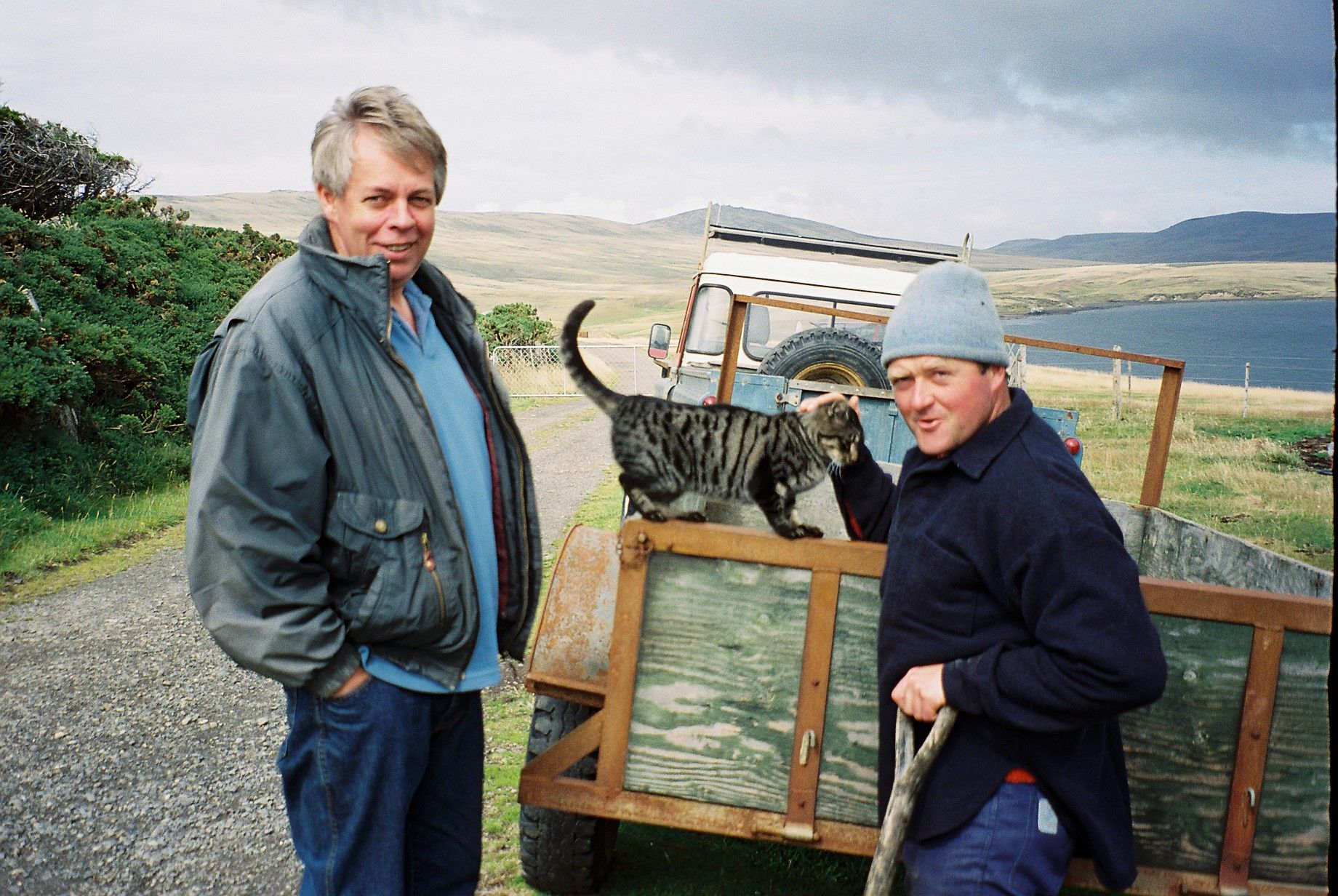
- Two Falkland Islanders in 2003

Regions with significant populations
- Falkland Islands: 1,644 (2021); United Kingdom: N/A (Note: The United Kingdom census does not record the number of Falkland Islanders living in the UK.)

Languages
- English (see Falkland Islands English)

Religion
- Christianity (Protestantism (Anglicanism, Presbyterianism, Lutheranism, Seventh-day Adventist Church), Roman Catholicism, Jehovah's Witnesses); Baháʼí minority

Falkland Islanders, also called Falklanders, are the people of the Falkland Islands, a British Overseas Territory in South America.

While it was long believed that the Falkland Islands were never discovered or inhabited by Indigenous peoples prior to European arrival, recent scientific evidence suggests otherwise. Archaeological and paleoecological data indicate prehistoric human activity on the islands centuries before European exploration. This evidence, which includes traces of abrupt fire activity, deposits of mixed marine vertebrates, and a locally sourced stone projectile point, suggests that capable seafaring peoples from Tierra del Fuego, such as the Yaghan (Yámana), may have reached the islands during the Holocene. The modern Falkland Islander population derives from various origins since the 19th century. Earliest among these are the numerically small but internationally diverse early 19th century inhabitants of the Islands, comprising and descended in part from settlers brought by Luis Vernet, and English and American sealers; South American gauchos who settled in the 1840s and 1850s; and since the late 1830s, settlers largely from Britain (especially Scotland and Wales) with a minority from other European countries. More recently, there have been significant levels of immigration from Saint Helena, Chile, the Philippines, and Zimbabwe.

== Identity ==
The Falkland Islanders consider themselves a nation, the ethnogenesis of which is no different from that of other immigrant nations typical of the Americas, Australia or New Zealand; indeed no different from the case of neighbouring South American nations, as pointed out by Councillor Mike Summers:

We are as much a people as those in Argentina, Uruguay, Brazil and Chile and many other South American countries whose inhabitants are of principally European, Indigenous or African descent.

— Councillor Mike Summers OBE

"Kelpers" is a nickname given to Falkland Islanders because the islands are surrounded by large amounts of kelp. This term is no longer used as commonly as it once was (largely because it is considered racist and insulting by some islanders when used by Argentines).

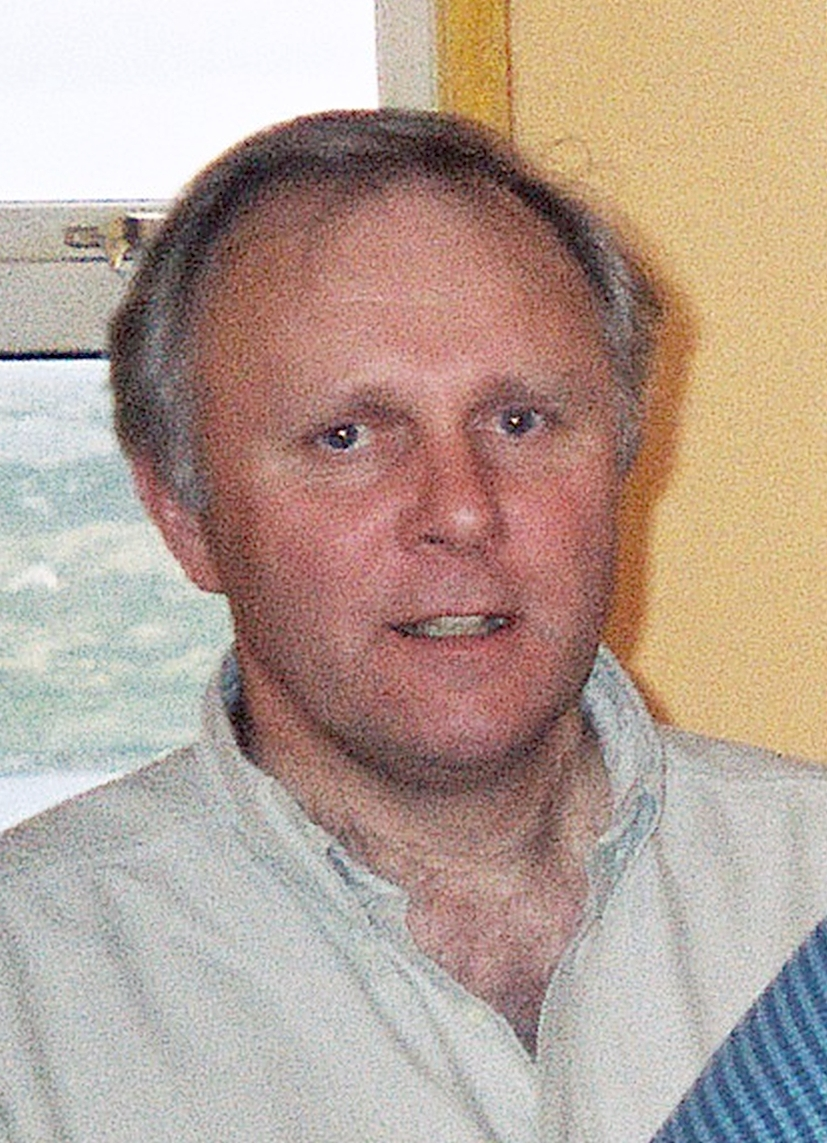
Hon. Lewis Clifton OBE. Speaker, Falklands Legislative Council.

The Falkland Islanders are British by citizenship, and by either origins or naturalization. They are one of the nations and mini-nations of the United Kingdom and the British overseas territories, including also the English, Scots, Welsh, Northern Irish, Channel Islanders, Gibraltarians, Saint Helenians, Bermudians, Caymanians etc. Along with their common British identity, each of these has its own distinct identity shaped in the respective particular circumstances of political, economic, social and cultural evolution history. According to Lewis Clifton, Speaker of the Falklands Legislative Council, the Falkland Islanders are no exception:

British cultural, economic, social, political and educational values create a unique British-like, Falkland Islands. Yet Islanders feel distinctly different from their fellow citizens who reside in the United Kingdom. This might have something to do with geographical isolation or with living on a smaller island – perhaps akin to those British people not feeling European.

Besides geographical isolation, the emerging of a distinct Falkland Islander national identity along with the originally undifferentiated British identity was possibly influenced by the devolution processes taking place among the United Kingdom nations:

The recent devolution aspirations of Wales and Scotland may be a factor. No sociological study has ever been commissioned to try to identify a plausible theory, and therefore it is difficult to elaborate on this emerging dichotomy, but significant sociological change has occurred.

Since the 1960s, the political dimension of Falklander identity has evolved around the campaign for recognition of the Islanders' right to self-determination. Key to this was the formation of the Falkland Island Committee in 1968, Britain's recognition of the right to self-determination after the Islanders turned down the so-called "leaseback proposal" put forward by the Foreign and Commonwealth Office in 1980, and the new Falklands Constitution enacted in 1985. The constitution vests political power in the elected Falklands Legislative Council rather than the old style colonial governors.

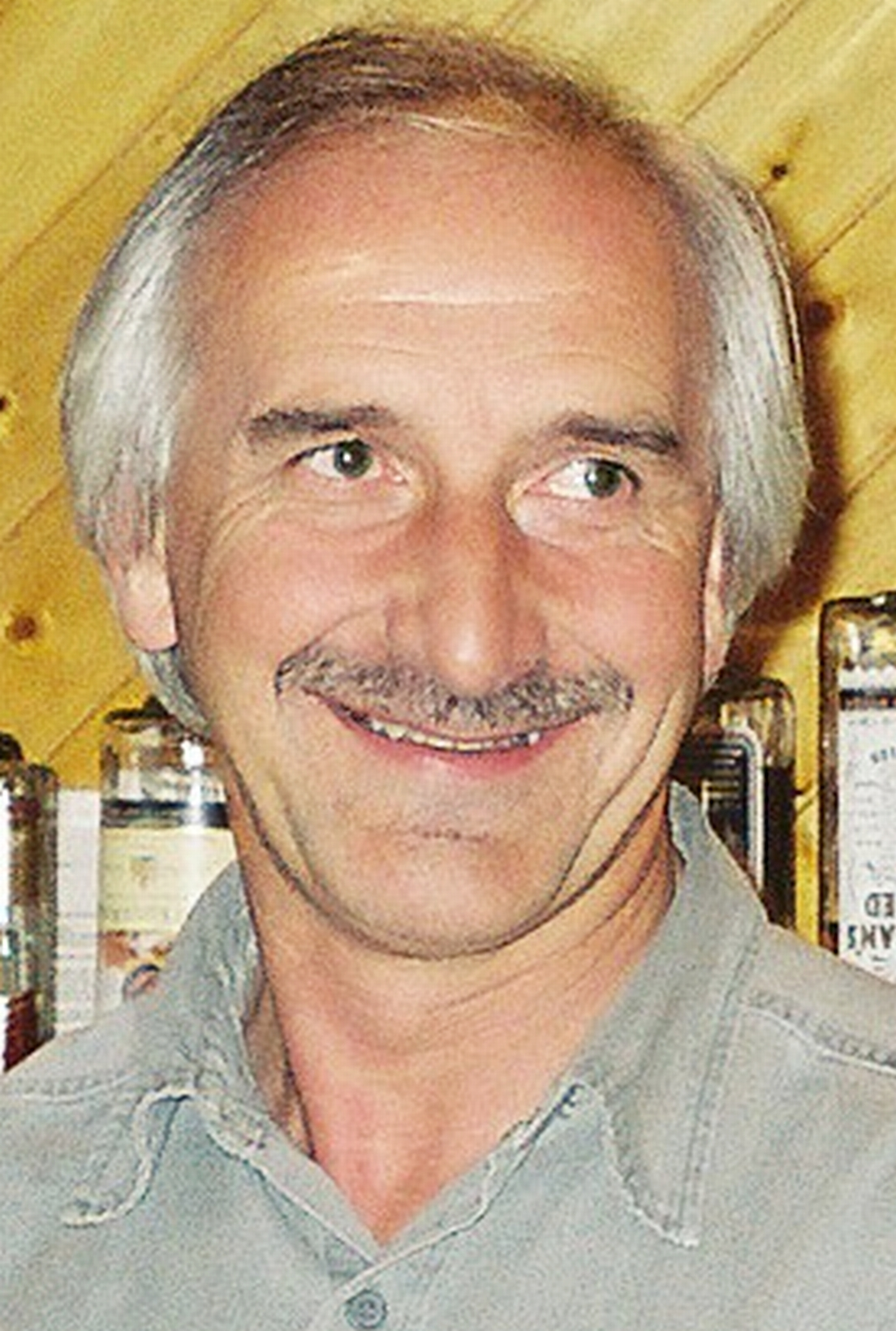
Hon. Mike Summers OBE. Member of the Falkland Islands Legislative Assembly.

A specific regional aspect of identity is the human relationship the Islanders traditionally maintain with Chile and Uruguay, and the well-known Islander rejection of the Argentine sovereignty claim:

In the Falkland Islands a national identity dynamic also exists: it is constructed upon the Islanders' desire not to deal with Argentina.

The Falklands War had tremendous security, economic and social implications for the Falkland Islanders. The War opened the prospects for long needed reforms, reversing the demographic, economic and social decline that the Falklands had suffered for several decades. The Islanders became self-confident masters of their natural resources, and managers of a vibrant economy that attracted a wide range of new technical and managerial personnel to immigrate.

== History ==
=== Early settlers ===
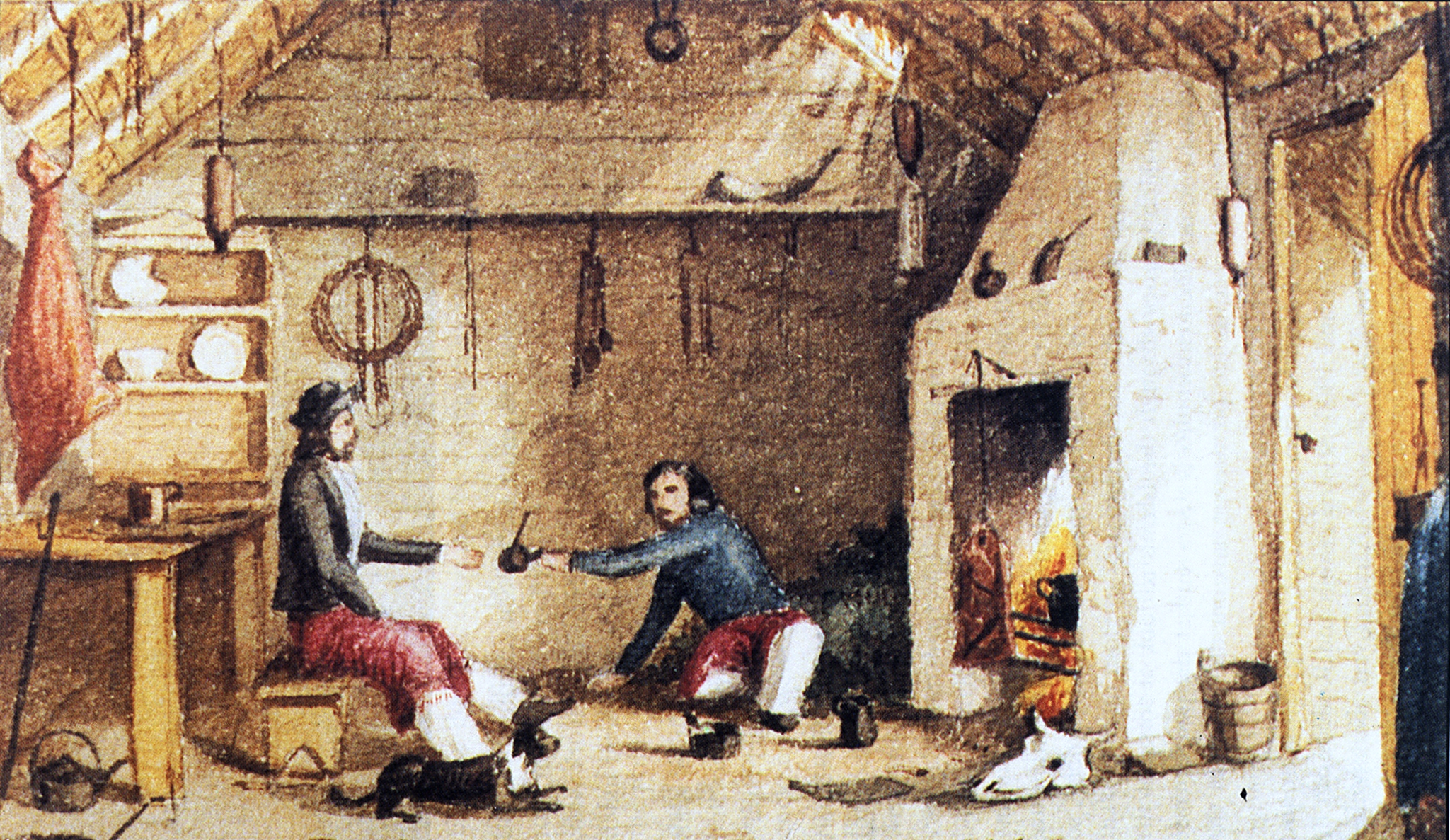
Falklands gauchos having mate. Watercolour by Dale, manager of Hope Place – Saladero in the 1850s.

Following the abandonment of the archipelago by the Spanish authorities in 1811, the only inhabitants of the islands were people who in their various capacities travelled back and forth, carried out a variety of commercial and shipping activities, sought refuge there, and through various efforts attempted to colonize the islands. Most numerous by far among them were the English and American sealers who had pursued their industry on the Falklands at least since the 1770s, as pointed out by US Secretary of State Edward Livingston. The average number of English and American sealing vessels operating in the area is estimated between 40 and 50, meaning that several hundred to 1,000 sealers were involved.

The settlement of Port Louis, established by Vernet on the site of the former Spanish settlement of Puerto Soledad, had about 100 inhabitants at its high point. In his account of his voyages in HMS Beagle, Captain Robert FitzRoy quoted references to the numbers and makeup of the inhabitants from a fellow officer who had previously visited Port Louis. According to that source there were about 100 people in the settlement, comprising:

25 Gauchos and 5 Indians, 2 Dutch Families, 2 or 3 Englishmen, a German family, the remainder were Spaniards and Portuguese, pretending to follow some trade, but doing little or nothing. The Gauchos he said were Buenos Ayreans and their Capataz a Frenchman.

That population was reduced in 1831–32 by various means unconnected with the British arrival at Port Louis on 2 January 1833. Luis Vernet and his family left the Falklands, and returned to Buenos Aires in November 1831 following his action involving the use of force against local American sealers, while the United States warship USS Lexington, Commander Silas Duncan arrested seven residents he deemed responsible for the detention of US sealing vessels, and also transported from the islands a further 33 persons, including families. In his report on the incident Duncan says:

But in taking this step I have consulted their own wishes, and they have embarked on board the Lexington by general consent; they say they have been deceived by Vernet and others, who have kept many of them upon the Island contrary to their inclinations and appeared greatly Rejoiced at the opportunity thus presented of Removing with their families from a desolate Region where the climate is always cold and cheerless and the soil extremely unproductive. These individuals some of whom have families, come from Buenos Ayres and Monte Video, also, and are principally Germans; they appear to be industrious and well disposed persons.

On 5 January 1833, at the moment when the remaining Argentine military abandoned the islands, 27 of the original Vernet settlers and two temporary residents remained in Port Louis. These included 12 gauchos from Argentina and their Capataz (foreman); a Frenchman; five Indians from Montevideo, Uruguay; three women from mainland South America and their two children. Other nationalities recorded are Irish, Scottish, German, and North American, making up a tiny population of some seven different nationalities.

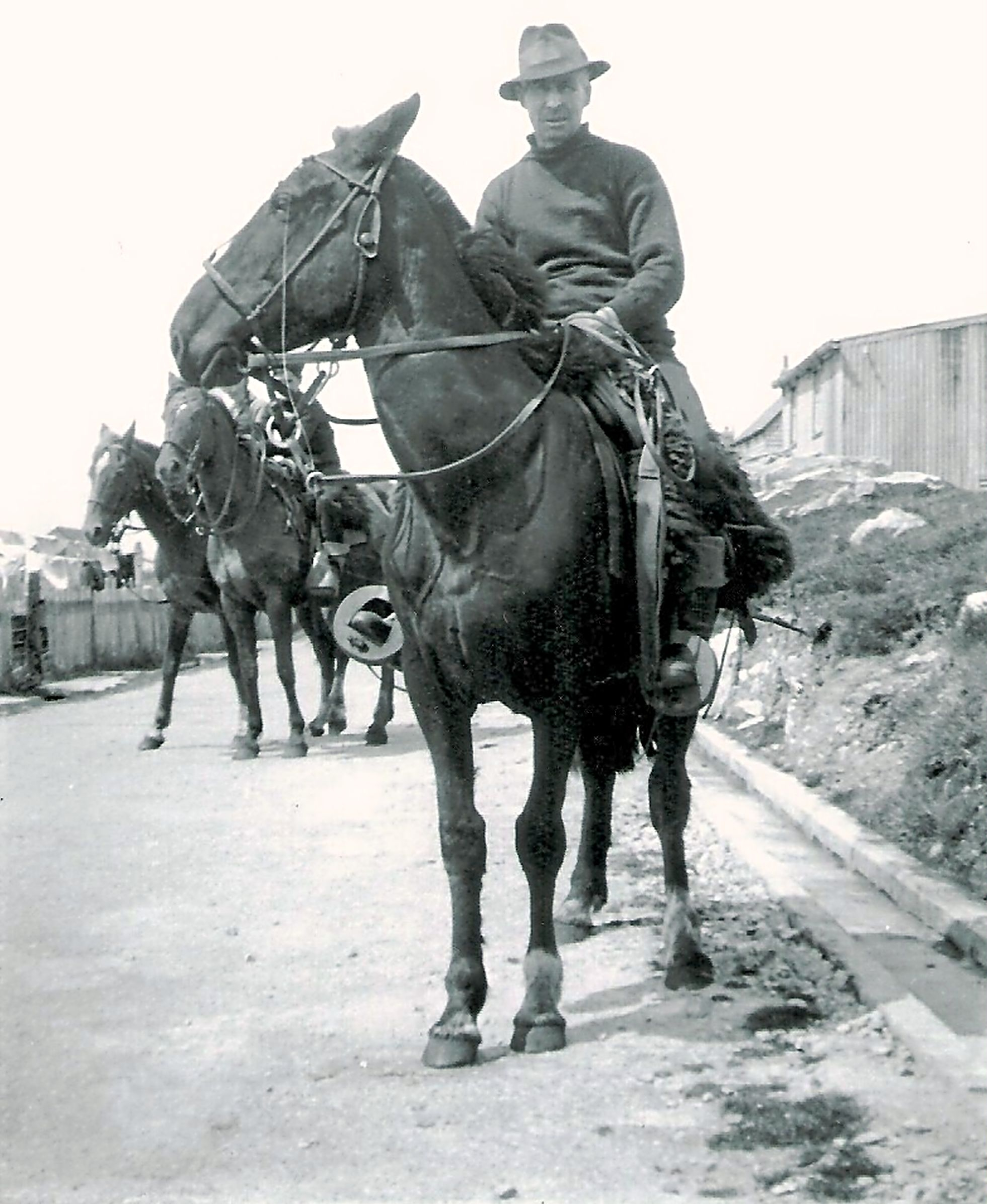
An Islander mounted in typical Falklands style with the usual gaucho horse gear, c. 1936.

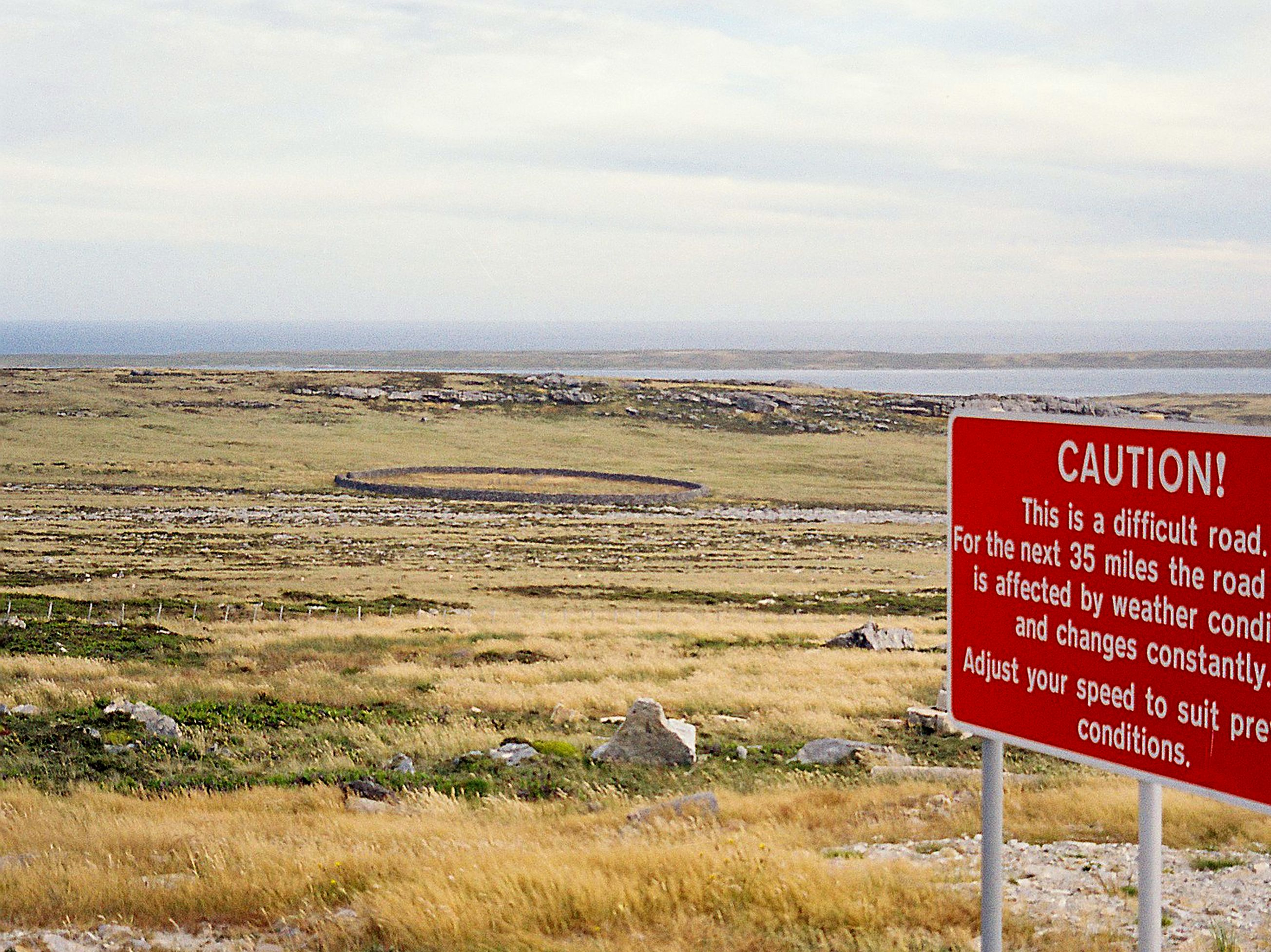
Gaucho stone corral at Sapper Hill, East Falkland (120 m in diameter, 3 m high); dated 1840s.

An insight into the state of the local population in March 1833 is provided by Captain Fitzroy who outlines the scene of a land based population that is vastly outnumbered by the many ships that ply their trade around the islands, the whole completely unregulated by any authority whatsoever:

The gauchos wished to leave the place, and return to the Plata, but as they were the only useful labourers on the islands, in fact, the only people on whom any dependence could be placed for a regular supply of fresh beef, I interested myself as much as possible to induce them to remain, and with partial success, for seven staid out of twelve ... Although the climate is so much colder than that of Buenos Ayres, the gauchos sleep in the open air, when in the interior, under their saddles, just as they do in the latitude of 35°. While idling at the settlement they gamble, quarrel, and fight with long knives, giving each other severe wounds. With their loose ponchos, slouched hats, long hair, dark complexions, and Indian eyes, they are characters fitter for the pencil of an artist than for the quiet hearth of an industrious settler. Besides these gauchos, we saw five Indians (p. 267), who had been taken by the Buenos Ayrean troops, or their allies, and allowed to leave prison on condition of going with Mr. Vernet to the Falklands. Including the crews of some thirty whale-ships, hovering about or at anchor among the islands; the men of several American vessels, all armed with rifles; the English sealers with their clubs, if not also provided with rifles; these cut-throat looking gauchos; the discontented, downcast Indian prisoners, and the crews of several French whalers – who could not or would not see why they had not as good a right to the islands as Englishmen – there was no lack of the elements of discord; and it was with a heavy heart and gloomy forebodings that I looked forward to the months which might elapse without the presence of a man-of-war, or the semblance of any regular authority.

Charles Darwin, who visited the Falklands in 1833 and 1834, was greatly impressed by the expertise of his two gaucho assistants in the exploration of the interior of East Falkland:

St Jago soon separated a fat cow, he threw his balls, they hit her legs, but did not entangle her: he dropped his hat to mark the place where the balls fell, uncoiled his lazo & again we commenced the chase; at last he caught her round the horns. (...) Meat roasted with its skin (carne con cuero) is known over all these parts of S. America for its excellence – it bears the same relation to common beef, which venison does to mutton. – I am sure if any worthy alderman was once to taste it, carne con cuero would soon be celebrated in London. (...) We slept in a valley in the neck of land which joins the Rincon del Toro, the great peninsula to the southwest point of the island. The valley was pretty well sheltered from the cold wind; but there was very little brushwood for making a fire; the Gauchos soon found what to my surprise made nearly as hot a fire as coals, it was the bones of a bullock, lately killed but all the flesh picked off by the Vultures. They told me that in winter time they have often killed an animal, cleaned the flesh from the bones with their knives, & then with these very bones roasted the meat for their dinner. What curious resources will necessity put men to discover!

According to Lieutenant B.J. Sullivan's survey of the Falklands, corroborated by other sources, in 1838 the then single settlement of Port Louis had a population of 40–45 residents including some gauchos and women from among Luis Vernet's settlers. The population grew to 50 in 1841, and 200 by 1849, boosted by the building of Stanley, the new capital with better port facilities which was inaugurated in 1845. New arrivals included more gauchos from South America and military pensioners, farmers and shepherds from the British Isles. The 1851 Falklands Census recorded 20 men as 'Gaucho' by profession, mostly of 'South American' nationality, with 8 of them having wives and young children.

Richard Clement Moody, the first British Governor of the Falkland Islands, recommended in his Dispatch 13 of 1842:

The settlers best adapted to colonise these Islands would be from among the industrious population of the Orkneys and the Shetlands, accustomed to a hardy life and as much seamen as landmen...

==== South American influence ====
The earliest known Falklands settler was Carmelita Penny (Simon) who had arrived as a slave after 1826. Her sons José Simon, Manuel Coronel Jr. and Richard Penny Jr. were all native Falkland Islanders (born in 1831, 1834 and 1837 respectively), whose fathers had been resident in the islands since before 1833. Among the prominent early Falkland Islanders of Buenos Ayrean origins were the gaucho Manuel Coronel Sr., Santiago Lopez (Darwin's 'St Jago'), German-born Charles Kussler, Antonina Roxa, and another slave Gregoria Madrid. Most popular among them was Antonina Roxa whose hard work in several occupations (she was a skillful gaucho, and worked as such at Hope Place – Saladero) made her the owner of a 6,000-acre (24 km^{2}) farm and valuable real estate in Stanley. The South American contribution to the Falklander ethnogenesis is further recorded by Commodore Augusto Lasserre of the Argentine Navy, who traveled extensively around the islands; according to his account there were up to 20 Argentine-born Islanders in 1869, "working either as labourers or foremen in the ranches, because in this kind of work they are better than the majority of the foreigners".

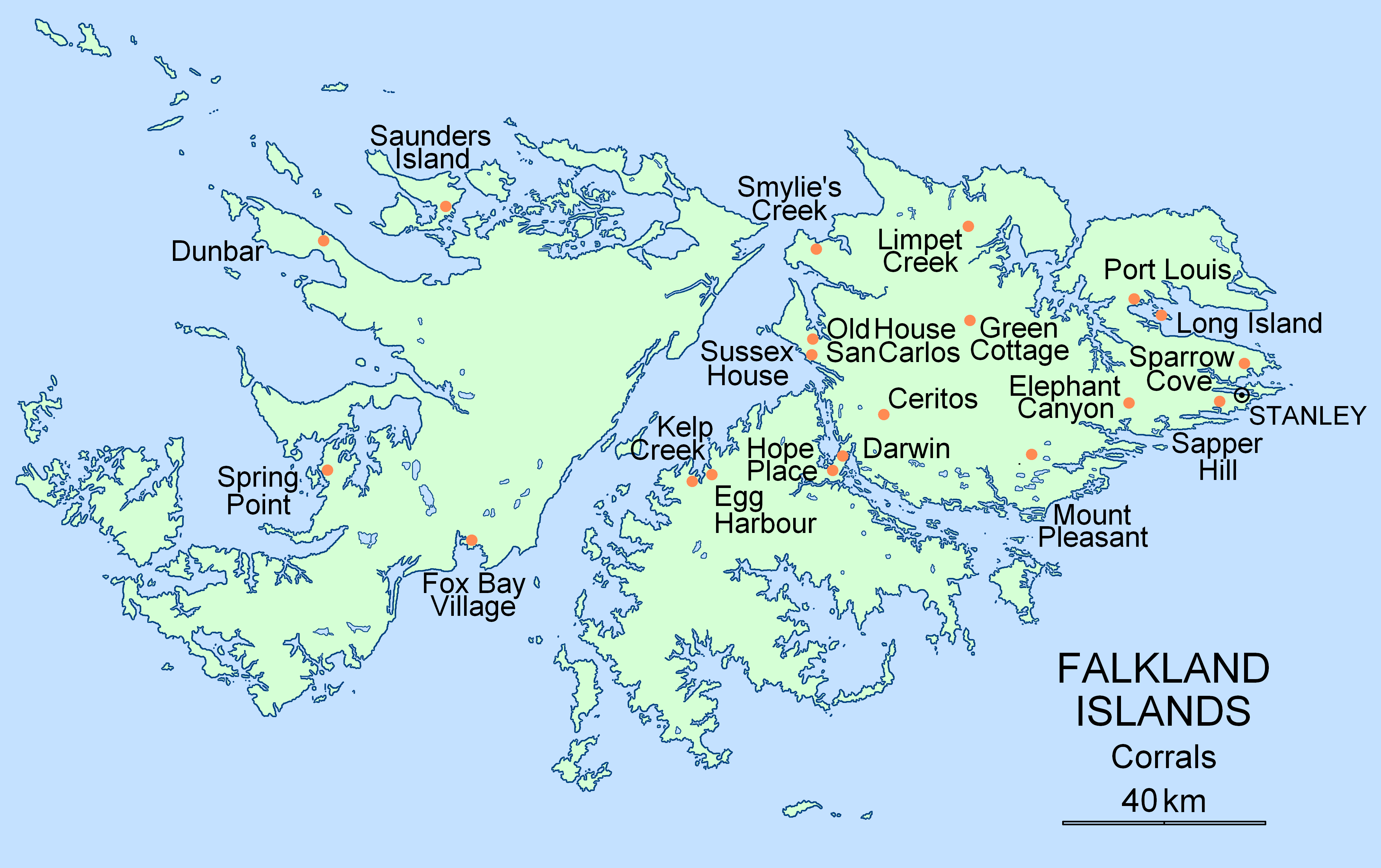
Location of some Falkland Islands corrals.

The mainland South American-born Falkland Islanders contributed to shaping the Falklander identity in the 1830s–1850s, and nowadays their legacy is visible in Falklands genealogy, Falklands English vernacular, and Falklands toponymy.

A number of modern Falkland Islanders have some mainland South Americans among their 19th century ancestors, mostly Uruguayan gauchos who settled in the islands in connection with the development of the cattle and sheep farming industry that was to form the backbone of the Falklands economy for rather more than a century, until the offshore fisheries assumed that role in the 1980s. Eventually, gauchos took part in the colonization of the uninhabited West Falkland in the 1860s and 1870s, although by that time many of them were of European origins (Scottish, Gibraltarian etc.). There are some two dozen stone or turf-built corrals scattered around Camp – picturesque historical monuments of the 1840s–1870s, the epoch of pioneers who settled and developed the country outside Port Louis and Stanley.

The Falklands English vernacular has a fair amount of borrowed Spanish words (often modified or corrupted); they are particularly numerous, indeed dominant in the local horse-related terminology. For instance, the Islanders use 'alizan', 'colorao', 'negro', 'blanco', 'gotiao', 'picasso', 'sarco', 'rabincana' etc. for certain horse colours and looks, or 'bosal', 'cabresta', 'bastos', 'cinch', 'conjinilla', 'meletas', 'tientas', 'manares' etc. for various items of horse gear.

Unlike the older English, French and Spanish place names given by mariners, which refer mainly to islands, rocks, bays, coves, and capes (points) important for navigation, the post-1833 Spanish names usually identify inland geographical locations and features, reflecting the new practical necessity for orientation, land delimitation and management in the cattle and sheep farming. Among the typical such names or descriptive and generic parts of names are 'Rincon Grande', 'Ceritos', 'Campito', 'Cantera', 'Terra Motas', 'Malo River', 'Brasse Mar', 'Dos Lomas', 'Torcida Point', 'Pioja Point', 'Estancia', 'Oroqueta', 'Piedra Sola', 'Laguna Seco', 'Manada', etc.

=== Late nineteenth to early twentieth century ===
The development of the sheep-breeding industry in the second half of the 19th century was accompanied by substantial immigration, increasing the population sevenfold in fifty years, from 287 in 1851 to 2,043 in 1901. The vast majority of immigrants during that period came from the British Isles, mostly from Scotland. Scots were particularly common in Darwin, many of them coming from the Orkney and Shetland Islands, which have a similar climate to these areas.

In 1871, many shepherds situation on the Falkland Islands Company's main farm at Darwin were of Scottish origin, and members of the Free Church of Scotland. Finding a growing need for a minister of their own, they undertook, with the assistance of the Company to employ a minister for Darwin, and in 1872, Rev Yeoman took up the appointment. In 1873, an iron constructed church was brought from England and erected at Darwin. About this time, it was estimated that one third of the Falklands' population belonged to the Presbyterian church. (...) As Stanley grew, the Darwin minister visited the town occasionally and held services in the infants' school.

An additional boost to that population growth came from the expansion of Stanley's port activities in service of the ships sailing between the Atlantic Ocean and the Pacific via the Strait of Magellan or Cape Horn. The port was particularly busy during the California Gold Rush, subsiding following the opening of the Panama Canal in 1914.

The early 20th century brought about a new industry to the region, Antarctic whaling in South Georgia, that supported a transient population varying from few hundred in winter to over 1,000 in summer. Some Falkland Islanders found employment with South Georgian whaling bases or ships, while some whalers settled in the Falklands to blend into the local populace. The whalers were predominantly Scandinavian (Norwegians, Swedes and Danes), with a minority of Britons, Germans, and a variety of other European nations. As a result of both natural demographic growth and ongoing immigration, the population of the Falkland Islands reached a peak of 2,392 recorded in the 1931 census, a figure that would not be surpassed until late in the twentieth century.

In the early 1930s, Governor James O'Grady observed that a substantial divide still existed between the residents of Stanley and the isolated Camp districts, who were primarily sheep farmers and shepherds. He described the Camp residents as "reticent" and "lonely" and stated "they and the town people are complete strangers", with many Camp residents visiting Stanley for the first time during the Falklands centenary celebrations in 1933.

=== Post-Falklands War ===
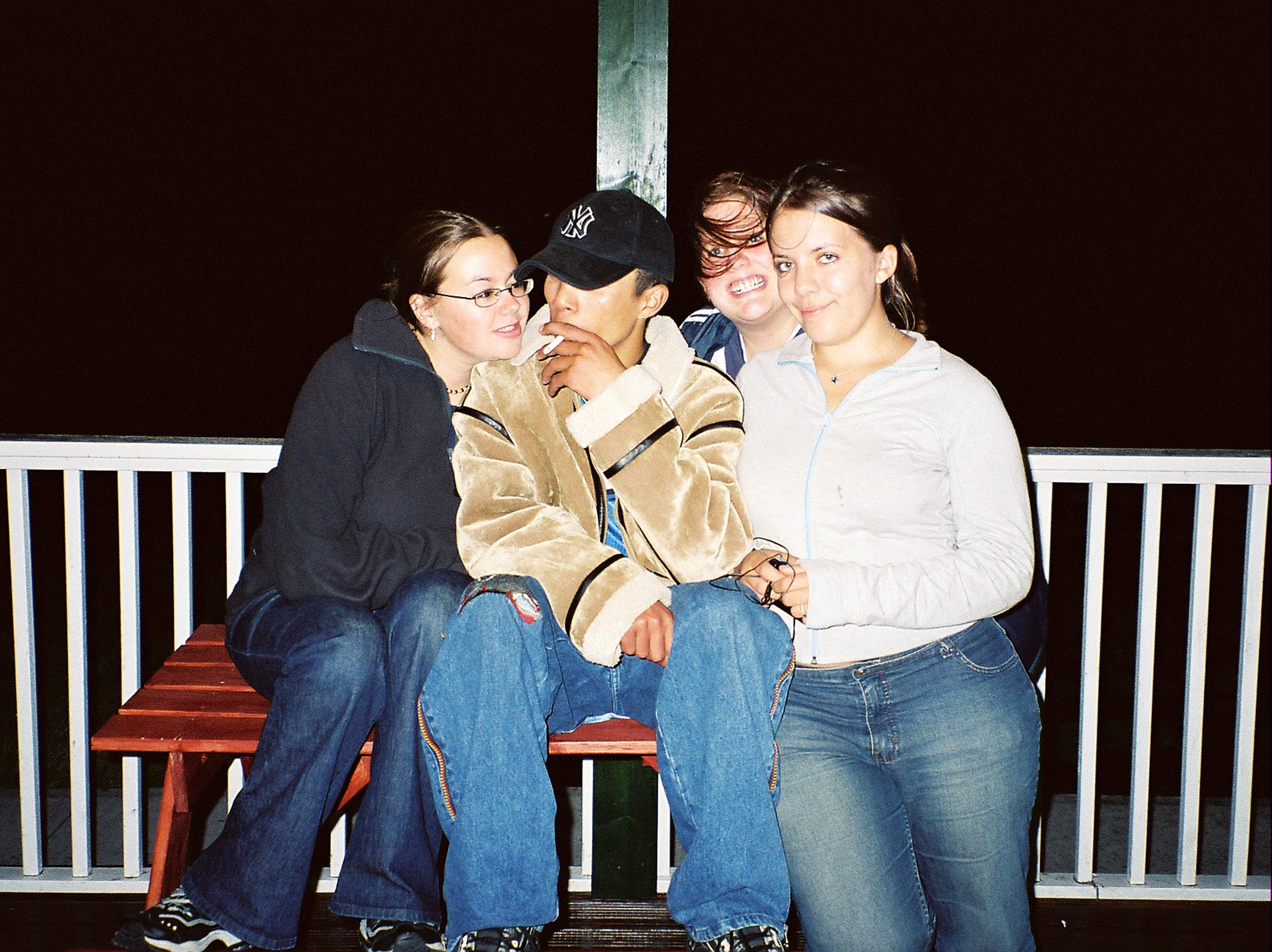
Falklands' youth.

Having shrunk as low as 1,813 in 1980, since the Falklands War the number of Falkland Islanders has been steadily increasing to exceed 3,100 in 2007. That new growth was supported by a thriving economy, with wool monoculture giving way to a more diversified agriculture, fisheries and tourism, augmented with services related to the military garrison as well as to the islands' role as one of the major gateways to neighbouring Antarctica. According to the 2001 census, the people who have settled in the Falklands during the last decade originated from the United Kingdom (30 per cent of the entire population excepting those resident in connection with the military garrison, including however some children born abroad to Falklander parents), Saint Helena and Ascension Island (6 per cent; 15.8 per cent if people resident in connection with the military garrison were included, Chile (3 per cent), Australia and New Zealand (2.3 per cent), Argentina (1 per cent), followed by Russia, Germany, with minor contributions by several dozens other nations from six continents. Children born abroad to Falkland Island women were enumerated in the 2001 census as being "Foreign-born".

Some Falkland Islanders were even born beyond the Antarctic Convergence, most recently in the 1980s in the territory of South Georgia and the South Sandwich Islands.

The Falkland Islands residents want to remain part of the United Kingdom following the 2013 referendum.

== Demographics ==
In the 2021 Falkland Islands census, 1,100 people (35% of the population of the Falklands) declared their nationality solely as Falkland Islander, 420 people (13% of the population) declared their nationality as Falkland Islander and British, and 144 people (5% of the population) declared their nationality as Falkland Islander and some other combination of national identities.

In the same census, 40% of the population of the Falklands was born in the Falklands, 25% of the population was born in the UK, and the remaining 35% of the population was born elsewhere.

About 70 percent of Falkland Islanders are of British descent, primarily as a result of Scottish and Welsh settlement to the islands. The native-born inhabitants call themselves "Islanders"; the term "Kelpers", from the kelp which grows profusely around the islands, is still used in the Islands. People from the United Kingdom who have obtained Falkland Island status are known locally as 'belongers'.

A few Islanders are of French, Gibraltarian, Portuguese, and Scandinavian descent. Some are the descendants of whalers who reached the Islands during the last two centuries. There is also a small minority of South American, mainly Chilean origin (5%), and in more recent times many people from Saint Helena (10%) and Philippines (5%) have also come to work and live in the Islands.

== Nationality ==
With retrospective effect from 1 January 1983, as provided in the British Nationality (Falkland Islands) Act 1983, the Falkland Islanders have been full British citizens.

== Religion ==
The most predominant religion is Christianity, of which the primary denominations are Church of England, Roman Catholic, United Free Church, and Lutheran. Smaller numbers are Jehovah's Witnesses, Seventh-day Adventists, and Greek Orthodox; with the latter being due to Greek fishermen passing through. There is also a congregation of the Baháʼí Faith. The islands are the home of the Apostolic Prefecture of the Falkland Islands.

== Languages ==
The official language of the islands is English. The Falklands English vernacular has a fair amount of borrowed Spanish words (often modified or corrupted); they are particularly numerous, and indeed dominant, in the local horse-related terminology. For instance, the Islanders use 'alizan', 'colorao', 'negro', 'blanco', 'gotiao', 'picasso', 'sarco', 'rabincana' etc. for certain horse colours and looks, or 'bosal', 'cabresta', 'bastos', 'cinch', 'conjinilla', 'meletas', 'tientas', 'manares' etc. for various items of horse gear.

Knowledge of Spanish as a foreign language is fairly widespread, as it is a compulsory subject in school, being the lingua franca in much of mainland South America. As the schools follow the English education system, European Spanish as prescribed by the Real Academia Española is taught, rather than a South American variety of the language, but Falkland Islanders may use seseo pronunciation typical of South American dialect. There is a small population of Hispanophones in the islands, consisting mostly of Chileans, and the language is also present in some place names.

== Sport ==
There are more than 30 different sports clubs on the Falklands, including badminton, clay-pigeon shooting, cricket, football, golf, hockey, netball, rugby union, sailing, swimming, table tennis and volleyball. The Falklands compete in the Commonwealth Games and in the biennial Island Games. Louis Baillon is the only Falkland Islander to have become an Olympic champion, as a member of the British field hockey team which won a gold medal in 1908.

== See also ==
- British people
- Falkland Islands English
- History of the Falkland Islands
- Timeline of the history of the Falkland Islands
