= Lithuania–United Kingdom relations =

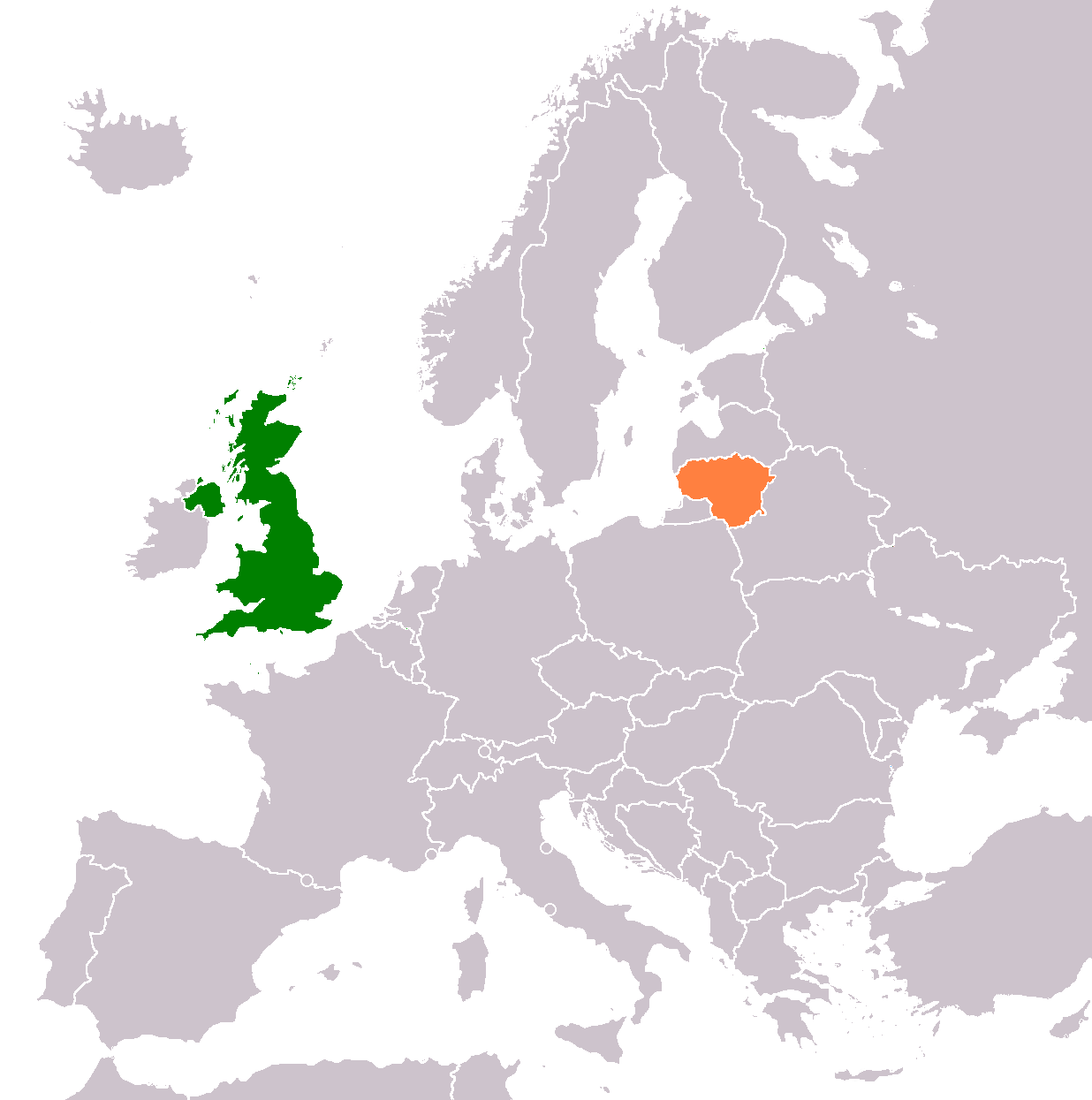

- United Kingdom: Lithuania

Lithuania–United Kingdom relations are foreign relations between Lithuania and the United Kingdom.

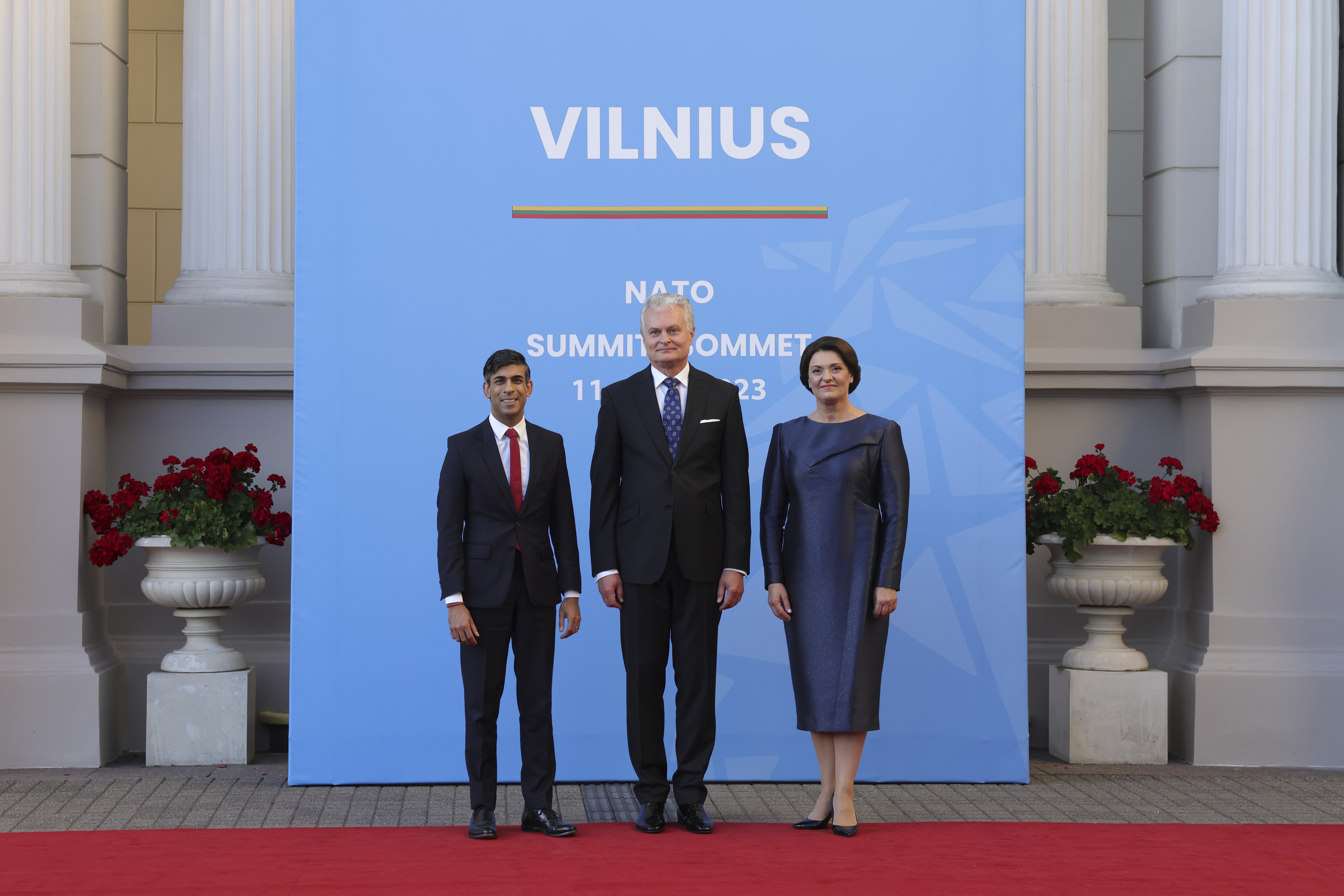
Gitanas Nausėda greets Rishi Sunak

The history of Lithuania's relations with the United Kingdom started on 20 December 1921 with de jure recognition of Lithuania's statehood. The UK became a key export partner. When Lithuania lost independence, the UK officially closed Lithuania's embassy in London but allowed the ambassador to act in this capacity. On 27 August 1991, the UK recognised the restored state of independent Lithuania and soon thereafter transferred to the Bank of Lithuania the frozen gold reserves of Lithuania. On 4 September 1991, the two countries resumed their diplomatic relations. In addition to intensive economic, military, social cooperation, Lithuania and the United Kingdom stand in close cooperation in the areas of education, science, and culture. Currently, there are 8 bilateral agreements regulating the relationship between Lithuania and the UK in various fields.

- The United Kingdom has an embassy in Vilnius and an honorary consulate in Klaipėda.
- Lithuania has an embassy in London and 5 honorary consulates (in Northern Ireland, Northumberland, Scotland, Wales and the West Midlands).
- There are around 100,000 Lithuanian people living in the United Kingdom.
- Both countries are full members of NATO.
- British Foreign and Commonwealth Office about relations with Lithuania
- Lithuanian Ministry of Foreign affairs: list of bilateral treaties with Poland (in Lithuanian only)

== History ==
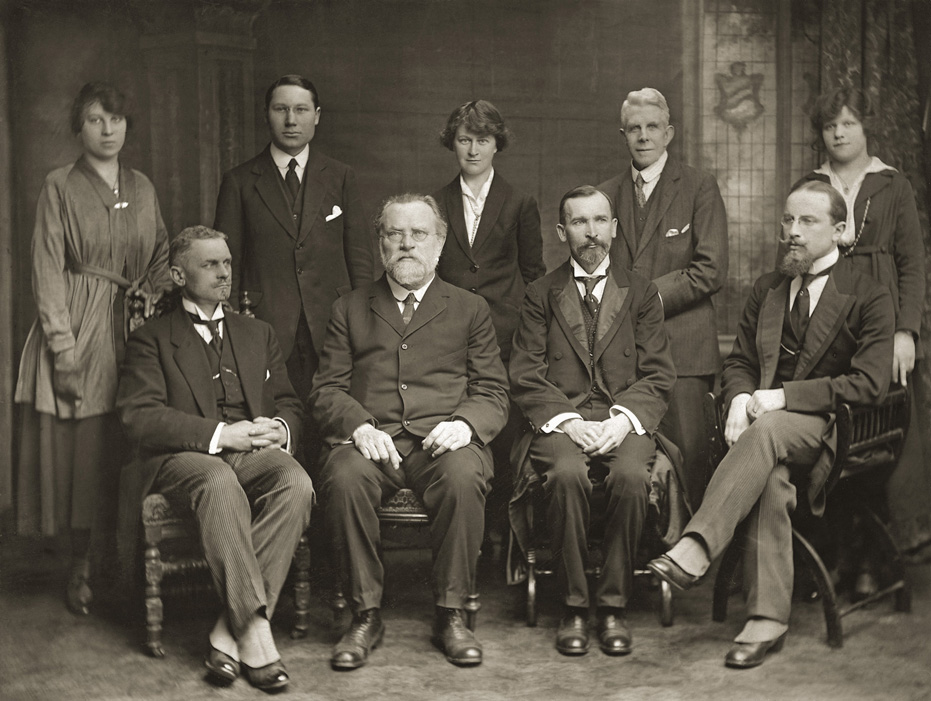
First representation of Lithuania in London, 1919

Although most of the trade between England and the Polish–Lithuanian Commonwealth was conducted via Polish port cities, some English merchant ships arrived in the small Lithuanian port town of Palanga in the 17th century.

Lithuania and the UK formally established diplomatic relations on 20 December 1922. During World War II, Lithuania was at various times occupied by the Soviet Union and Nazi Germany. The United Kingdom never recognised de jure the Soviet occupation and annexation of Lithuania in 1940. Lithuania continued diplomatic relations with the UK in exile and later claimed state continuity.

British prisoners of war were among Allied POWs held by the Germans in the Stalag Luft VI POW camp in German-occupied Lithuania.

The UK reaffirmed the restoration of Lithuanian independence on 27 August 1991. Both countries re-established the diplomatic missions in October 1991.

Both Lithuania and the United Kingdom provided contributions to the NATO mission in Afghanistan.

== Embassies and consulates ==
The United Kingdom has an embassy in Vilnius and an honorary consulate in Klaipėda. Lithuania has an embassy in London and five honorary consulates (in Northern Ireland, Northumberland, Scotland, Wales and the West Midlands).

== Overview ==
There are around 100,000 Lithuanian people living in the United Kingdom. Both countries are full members of NATO.

The current ambassador to Lithuania is Brian Olley, and the ambassador to the UK is Renatas Norkus.

In 2006, the Queen of the United Kingdom Elizabeth II paid a visit to Lithuania.

Since 2014, Lithuania participates in the British-led Joint Expeditionary Force, a multi-national military partnership.

== Gallery ==
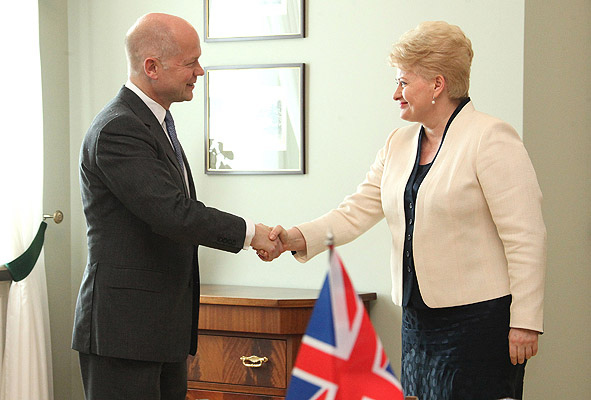
British Foreign Secretary William Hague meeting President of Lithuania Dalia Grybauskaitė

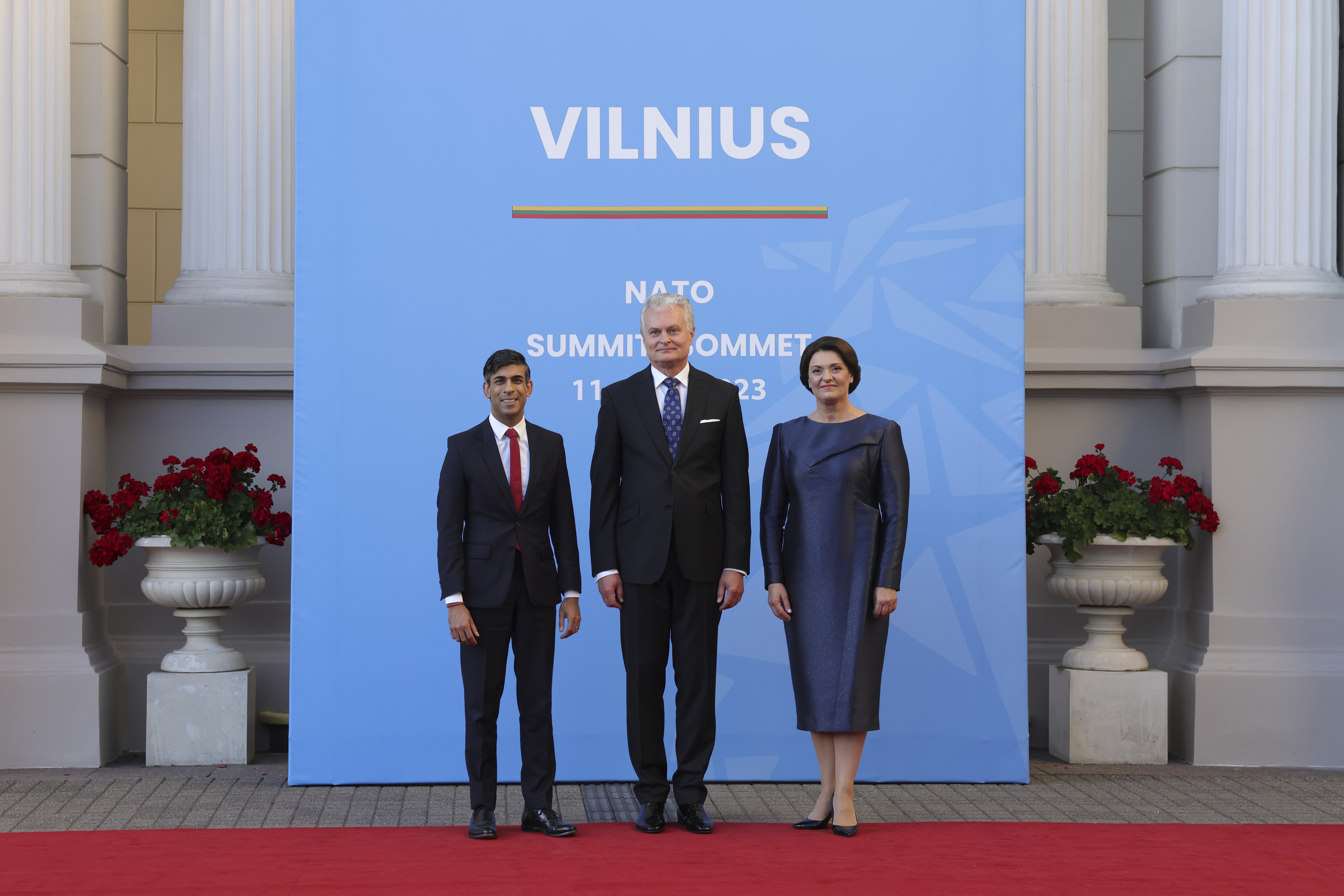
President of Lithuania Gitanas Nausėda greets British Prime Minister Rishi Sunak during the 2023 Vilnius Summit

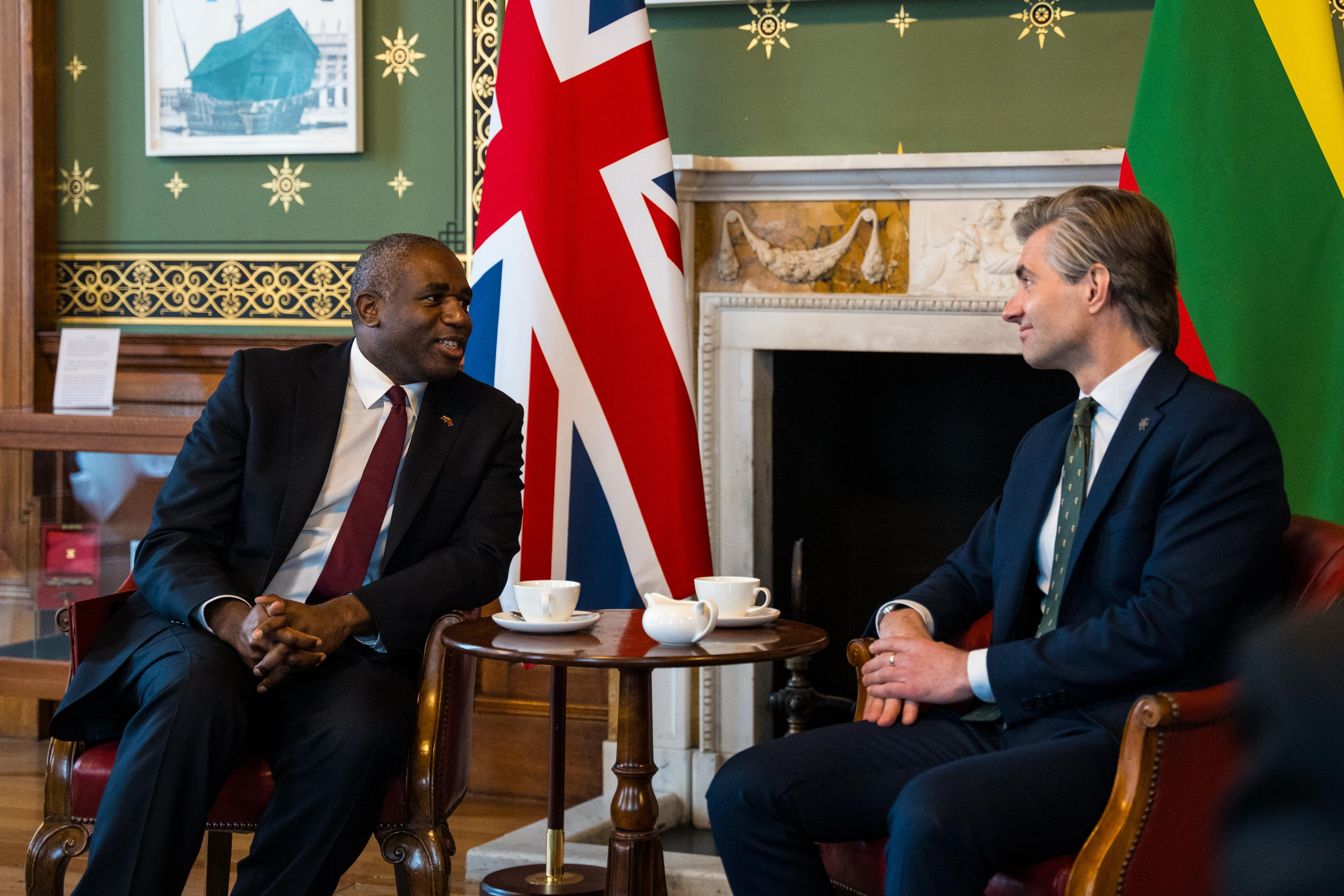
Foreign Secretary David Lammy with Lithuanian Foreign Minister Kęstutis Budrys in London, March 2025.

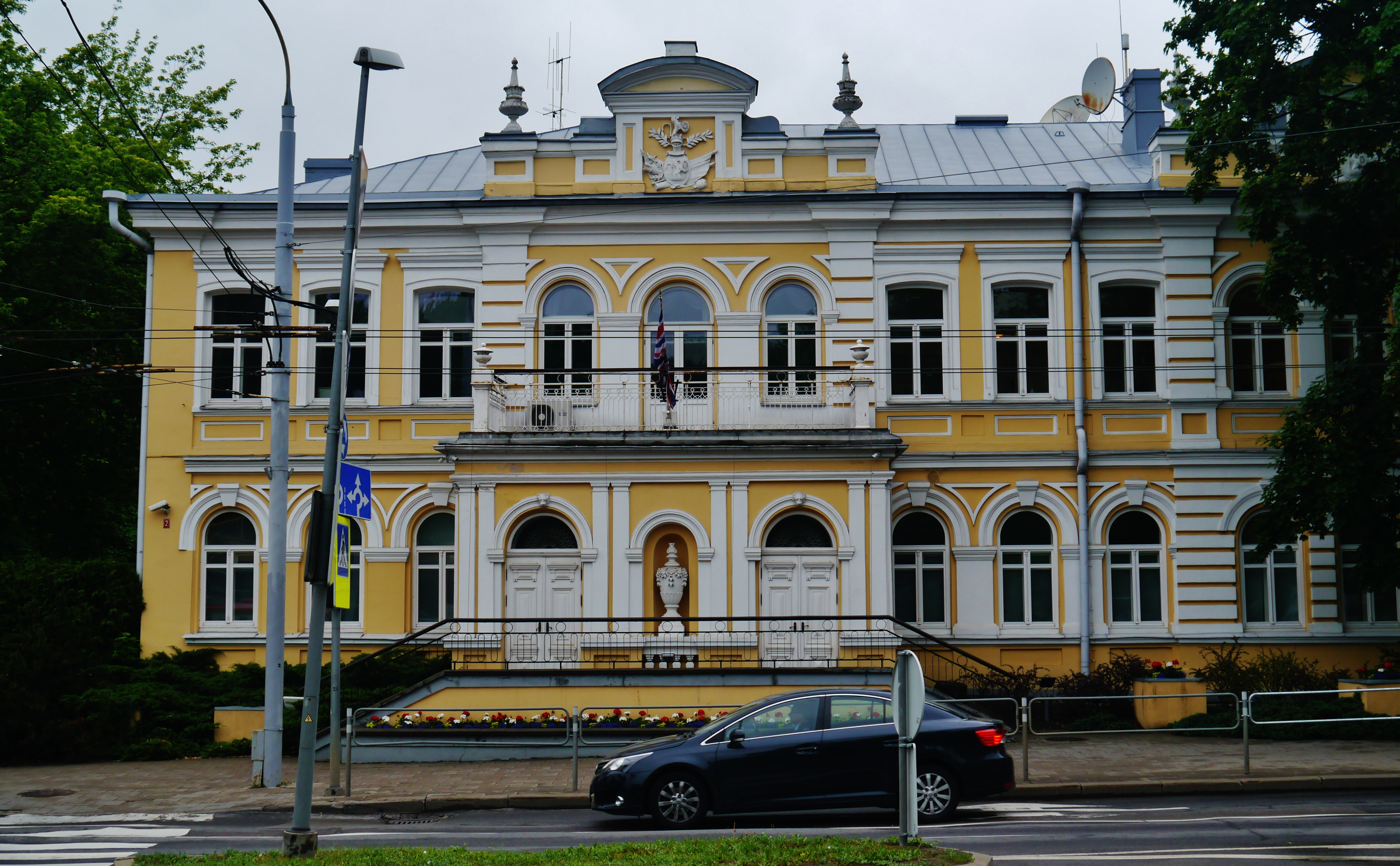
British Embassy in Vilnius

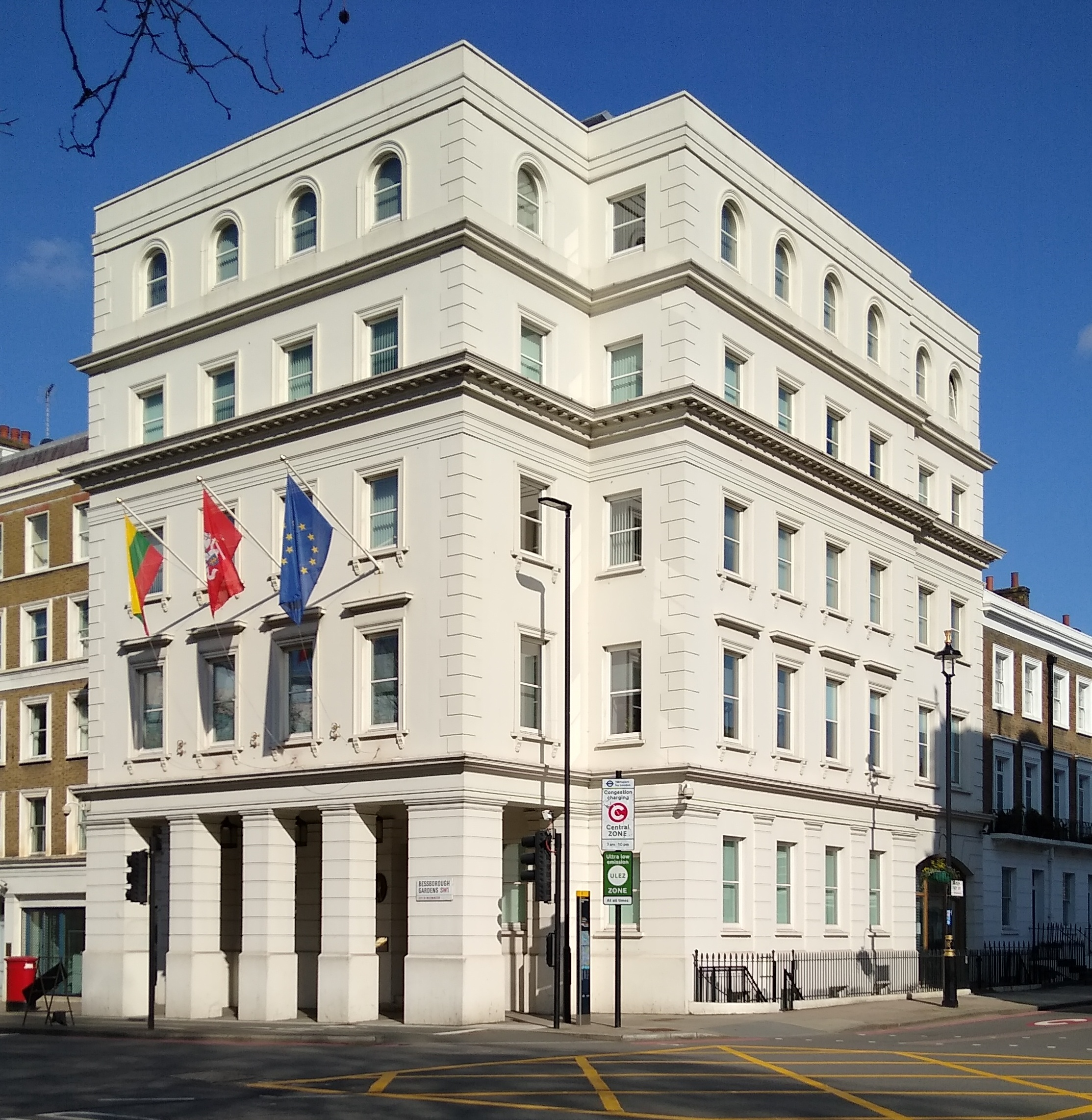
Embassy of Lithuania, London

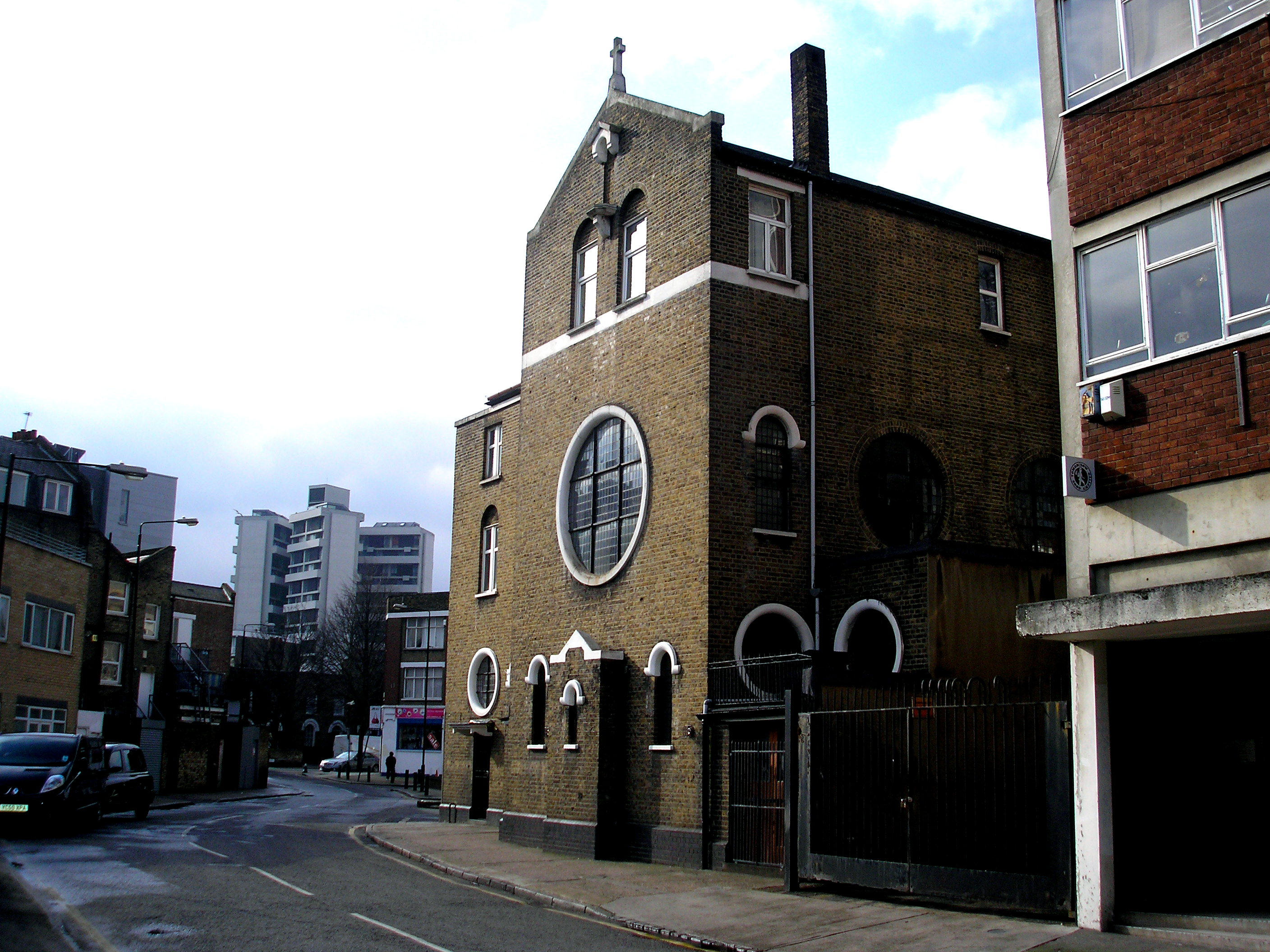
St Casimir's Lithuanian Church, a Lithuanian-speaking Roman Catholic church in Bethnal Green, London

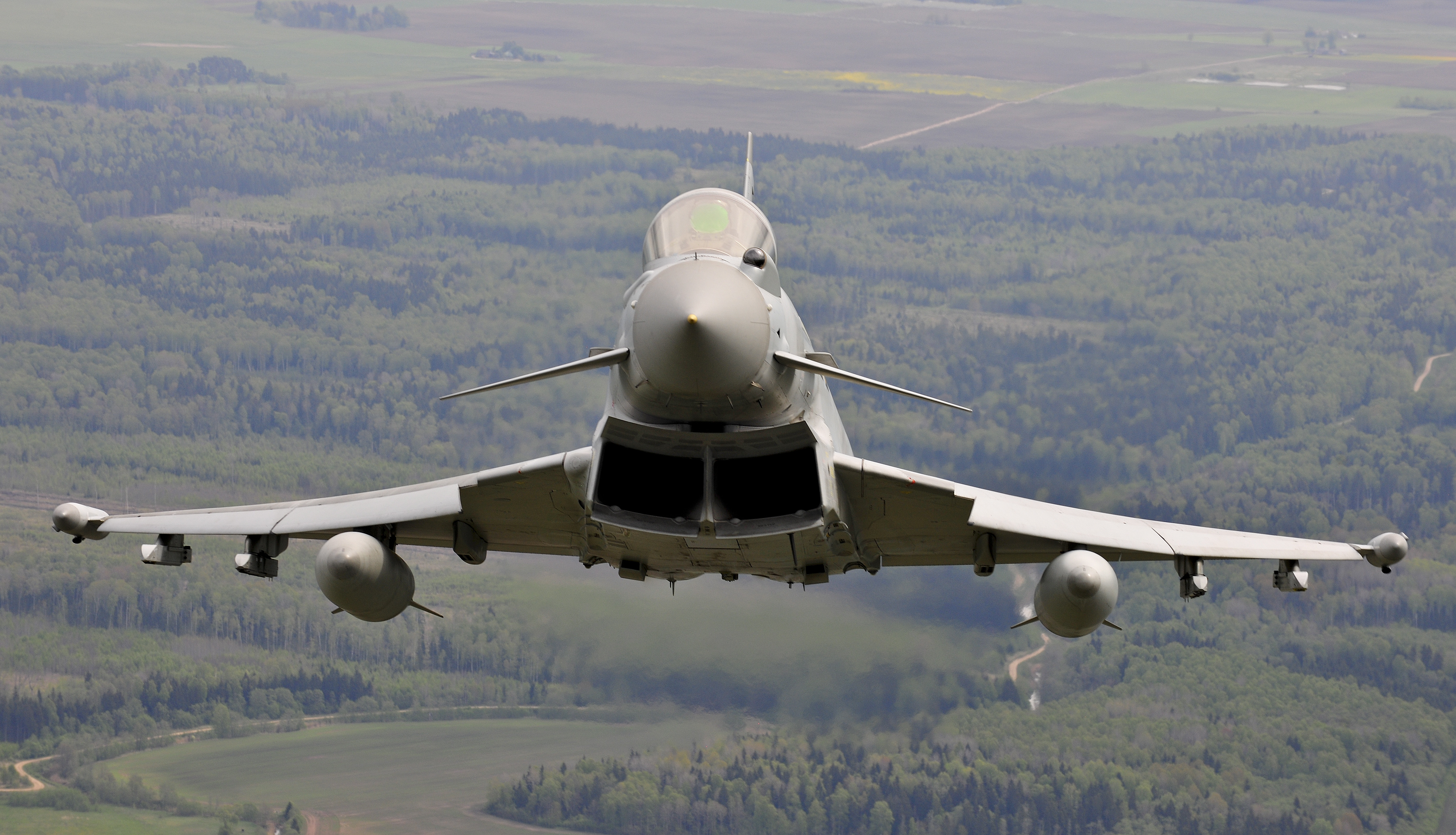
RAF Typhoon patrolling over Lithuania as part of the NATO Baltic Air Policing mission

== Resident diplomatic missions ==
- Lithuania has an embassy in London.
- The United Kingdom has an embassy in Vilnius.

== See also ==
- Foreign relations of the United Kingdom
- Foreign relations of Lithuania
- Lithuanians in the United Kingdom
