= List of diplomatic missions of Lithuania =

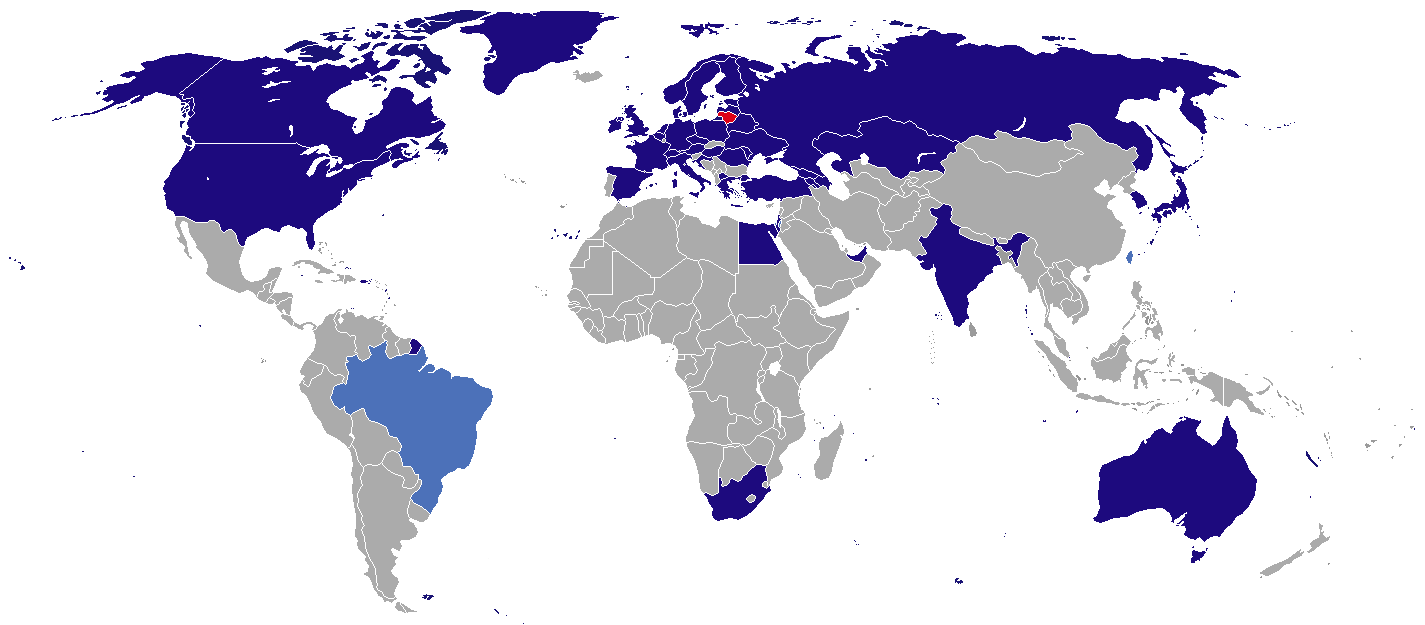
Countries hosting Lithuanian diplomatic missions

This is a list of diplomatic missions of Lithuania, excluding honorary consulates.

Lithuania and the other Baltic states, together with the Nordic countries have signed a memorandum of understanding on the posting of diplomats at each other's missions abroad, under the auspices of Nordic-Baltic Eight.

== Current missions ==
=== Africa ===
Host country	Host city	Mission	Concurrent accreditation	Ref.
Egypt	Cairo	Embassy	Countries: Jordan; Lebanon; International Organizations: Arab League (Note: Accredited as an observer mission.)	
South Africa	Pretoria	Embassy	Countries: Angola; Botswana; Eswatini; Lesotho; Mozambique; Namibia	

=== Americas ===
Host country	Host city	Mission	Concurrent accreditation	Ref.
Brazil	São Paulo	Consulate-General		
Canada	Ottawa	Embassy		
United States	Washington, D.C.	Embassy	Countries: Mexico; International Organizations: Caribbean Community; Organization of American States	
United States	Chicago	Consulate-General	Countries: Mexico; International Organizations: Caribbean Community; Organization of American States	
United States	Los Angeles	Consulate-General	Countries: Mexico; International Organizations: Caribbean Community; Organization of American States	
United States	New York City	Consulate-General	Countries: Mexico; International Organizations: Caribbean Community; Organization of American States	

=== Asia ===
Host country	Host city	Mission	Concurrent accreditation	Ref.
Armenia	Yerevan	Embassy		
Azerbaijan	Baku	Embassy	Countries: Turkmenistan	
Georgia	Tbilisi	Embassy		
India	New Delhi	Embassy	Countries: Bangladesh; Maldives; Nepal; Sri Lanka	
Israel	Tel Aviv	Embassy		
Japan	Tokyo	Embassy	Countries: Palau	
Kazakhstan	Astana	Embassy	Countries: Kyrgyzstan; Tajikistan; Uzbekistan	
Kazakhstan	Almaty	Consulate-General	Countries: Kyrgyzstan; Tajikistan; Uzbekistan	
Palestine	Ramallah	Representative Office		
Republic of China (Taiwan)	Taipei	Representative Office		
Singapore	Singapore	Embassy	Countries: Cambodia; Indonesia; Laos; Malaysia; Thailand; Vietnam; Multilateral Organizations: Association of Southeast Asian Nations	
South Korea	Seoul	Embassy	Countries: Mongolia; Philippines	
Turkey	Ankara	Embassy	Countries: Iran; Pakistan; Qatar	
United Arab Emirates	Abu Dhabi	Embassy	Countries: Bahrain; Kuwait; Iraq; Saudi Arabia	

=== Europe ===
Host country	Host city	Mission	Concurrent accreditation	Ref.
Austria	Vienna	Embassy	Countries: Liechtenstein; Slovakia; Slovenia	
Belarus	Minsk	Embassy		
Belarus	Grodno	Consulate-General		
Belgium	Brussels	Embassy	Countries: Algeria; Luxembourg	
Croatia	Zagreb	Embassy	Countries: Kosovo; Montenegro; North Macedonia	
Czech Republic	Prague	Embassy		
Denmark	Copenhagen	Embassy	Countries: Iceland	
Estonia	Tallinn	Embassy		
Finland	Helsinki	Embassy		
France	Paris	Embassy	Countries: Monaco; Morocco; Tunisia	
Germany	Berlin	Embassy		
Germany	Munich	Consulate-General		
Greece	Athens	Embassy	Countries: Albania; Cyprus	
Holy See (Note: The Lithuanian Embassy to the Holy See is located outside Vatican territory in Rome.)	Rome	Embassy	Sovereign entity: Sovereign Military Order of Malta	
Hungary	Budapest	Embassy	Countries: Bosnia and Herzegovina; Serbia	
Ireland	Dublin	Embassy		
Italy	Rome	Embassy	Countries: Libya; Malta; San Marino; International Organizations: Food and Agriculture Organization	
Latvia	Riga	Embassy		
Moldova	Chişinău	Embassy		
Netherlands	The Hague	Embassy	International Organizations: Organisation for the Prohibition of Chemical Weapons	
North Macedonia	Skopje	Embassy office (Note: Subordinate to the embassy in Zagreb.)		
Norway	Oslo	Embassy		
Poland	Warsaw	Embassy		
Poland	Sejny	Consulate		
Romania	Bucharest	Embassy	Countries: Bulgaria	
Russia	Moscow	Embassy		
Russia	Kaliningrad	Consulate-General		
Russia	Sovetsk	Consulate		
Spain	Madrid	Embassy	Countries: Andorra; Argentina; International Organizations: World Tourism Organization	
Spain	Valencia	Consulate	Countries: Andorra; Argentina; International Organizations: World Tourism Organization	
Sweden	Stockholm	Embassy		
Switzerland	Bern	Embassy		
Ukraine	Kyiv	Embassy		
United Kingdom	London	Embassy	Countries: Ethiopia; Oman; Portugal; International Organizations: African Union	

=== Oceania ===
Host country	Host city	Mission	Concurrent accreditation	Ref.
Australia	Canberra	Embassy	Countries: New Zealand; Timor-Leste	

=== Multilateral organizations ===
Organization	Host city	Host country	Mission	Concurrent accreditation	Ref.
Council of Europe	Strasbourg	France	Permanent Mission		
European Union	Brussels	Belgium	Permanent Mission		
NATO	Brussels	Belgium	Permanent Delegation		
OECD	Paris	France	Permanent Mission		
United Nations	New York City	United States	Permanent Mission	Countries: Guatemala	
United Nations	Geneva	Switzerland	Permanent Mission	International Organizations: World Trade Organization	
United Nations	Vienna	Austria	Permanent Mission	International Organizations: International Atomic Energy Agency; OSCE	
UNESCO	Paris	France	Permanent Mission		

== Gallery ==
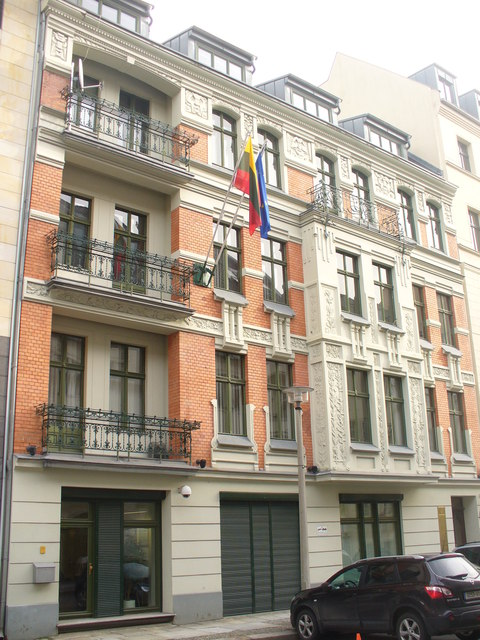
Embassy in Berlin

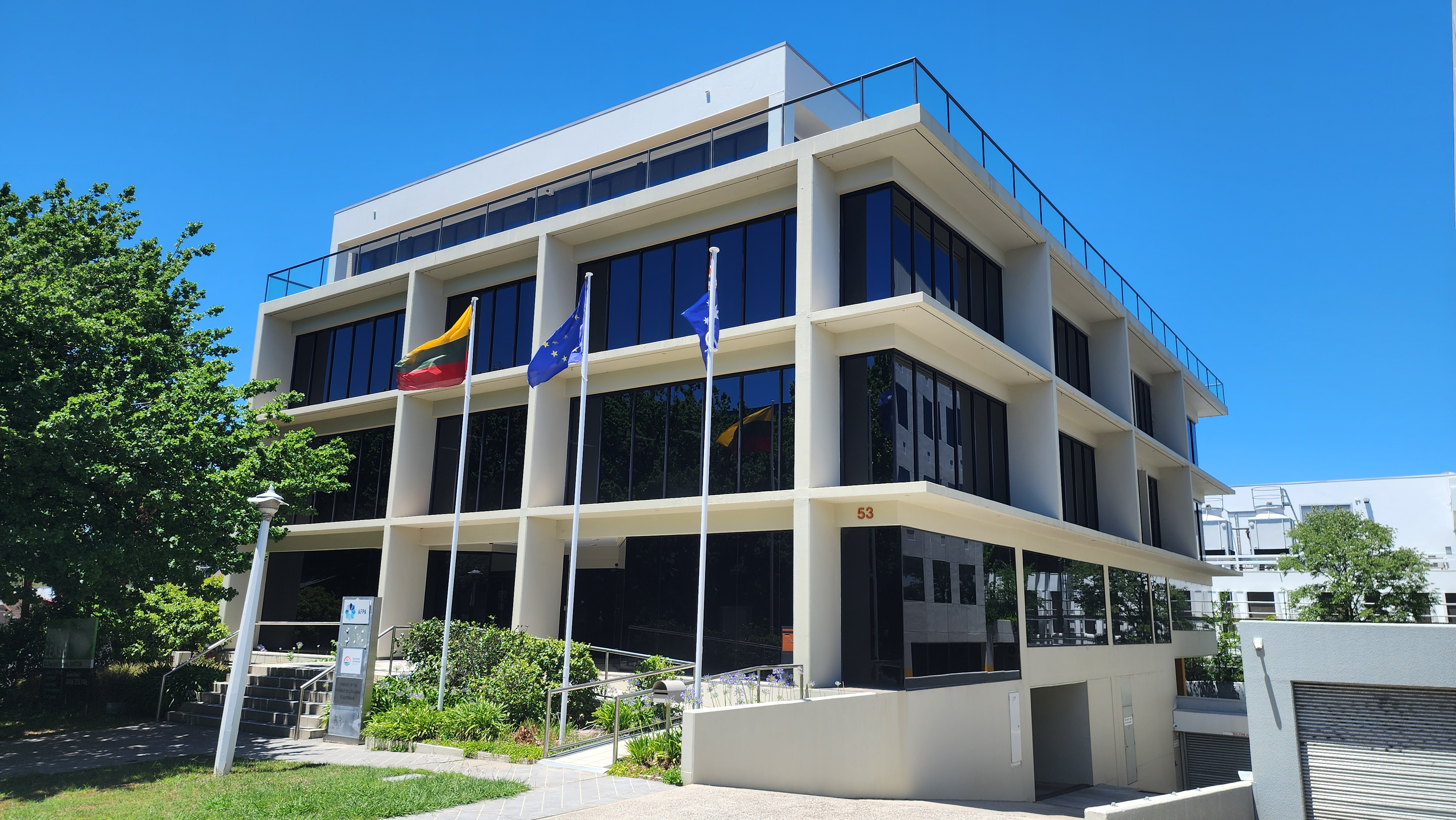
Embassy in Canberra

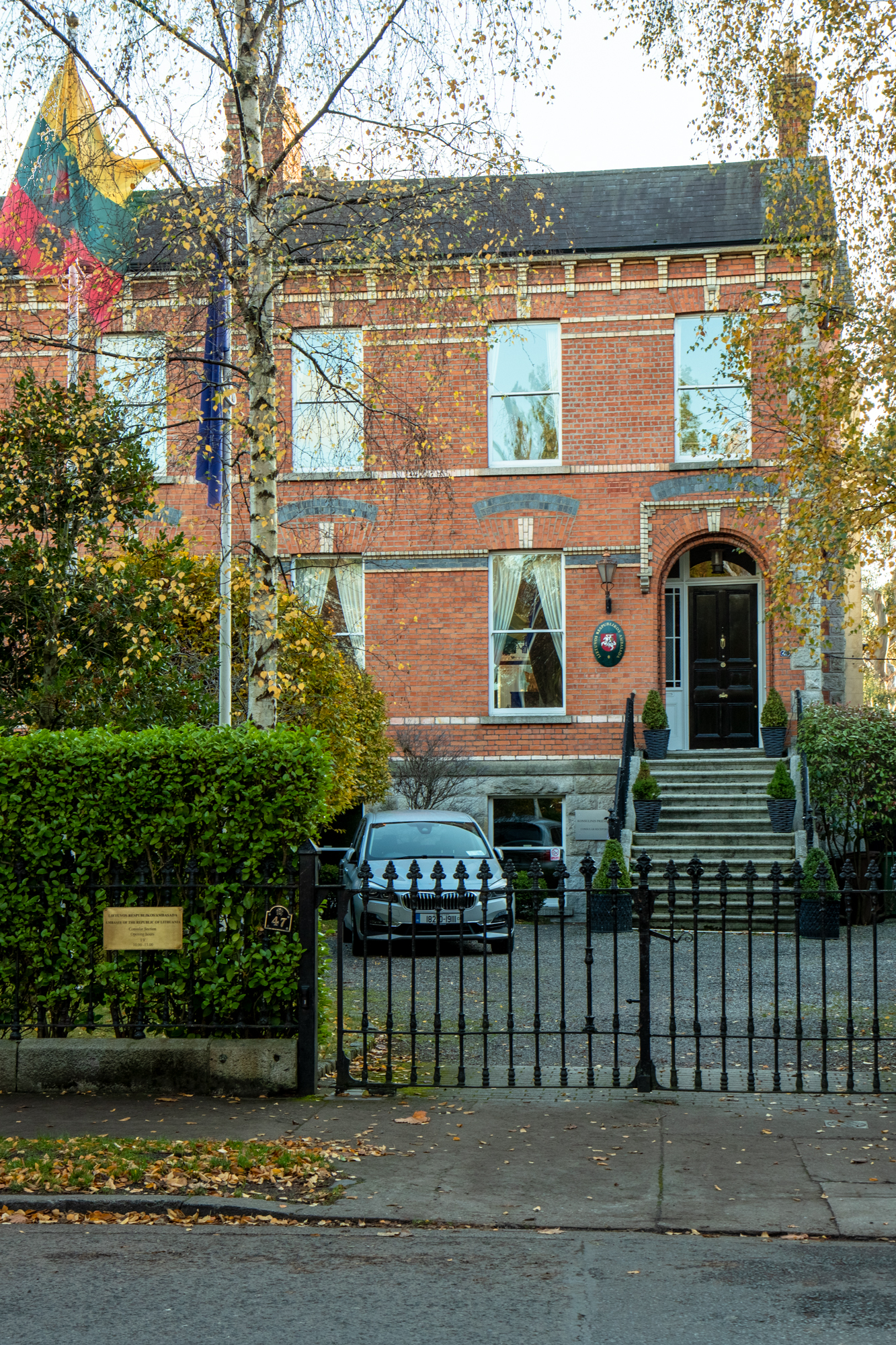
Embassy in Dublin

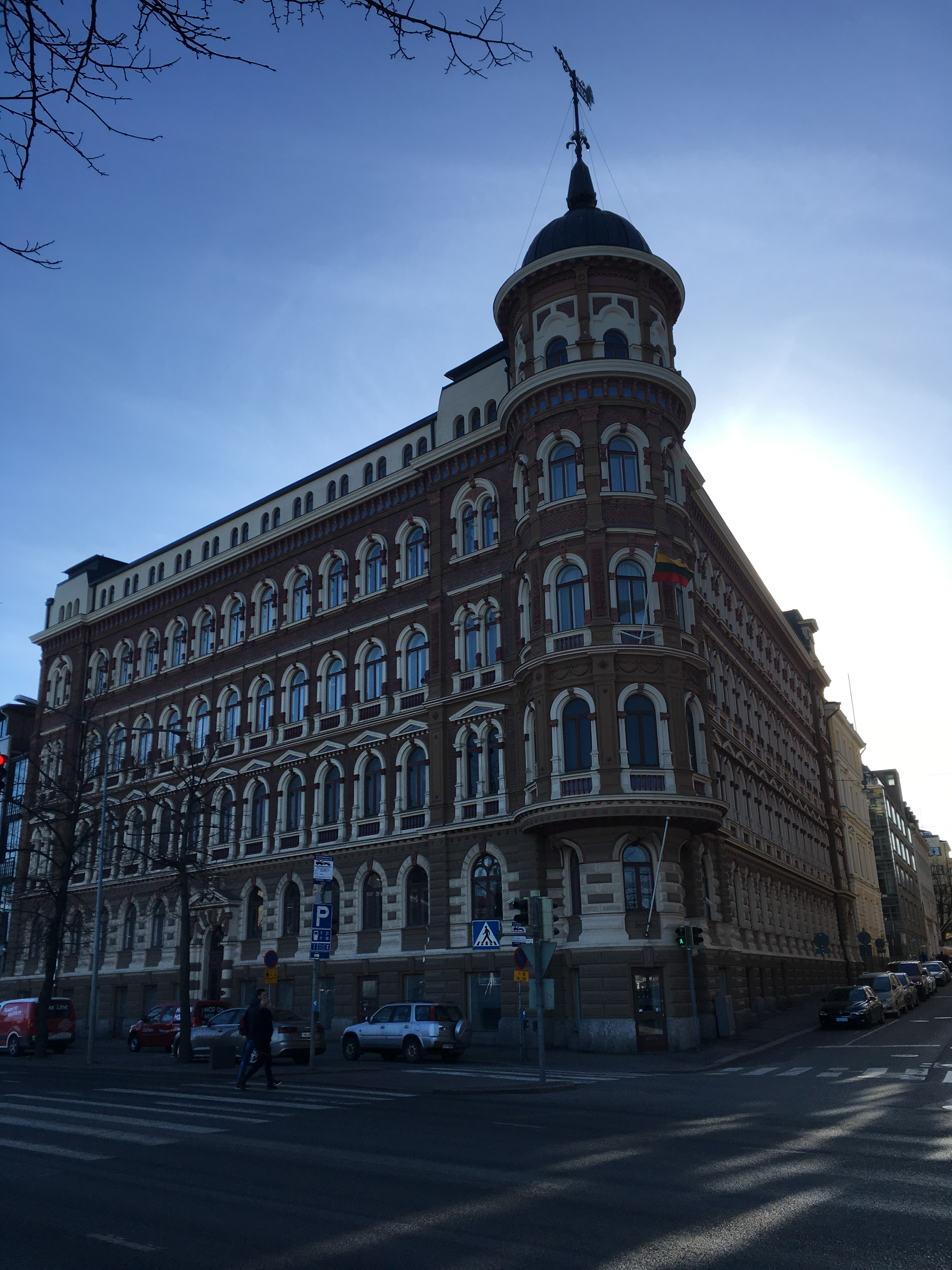
Embassy in Helsinki

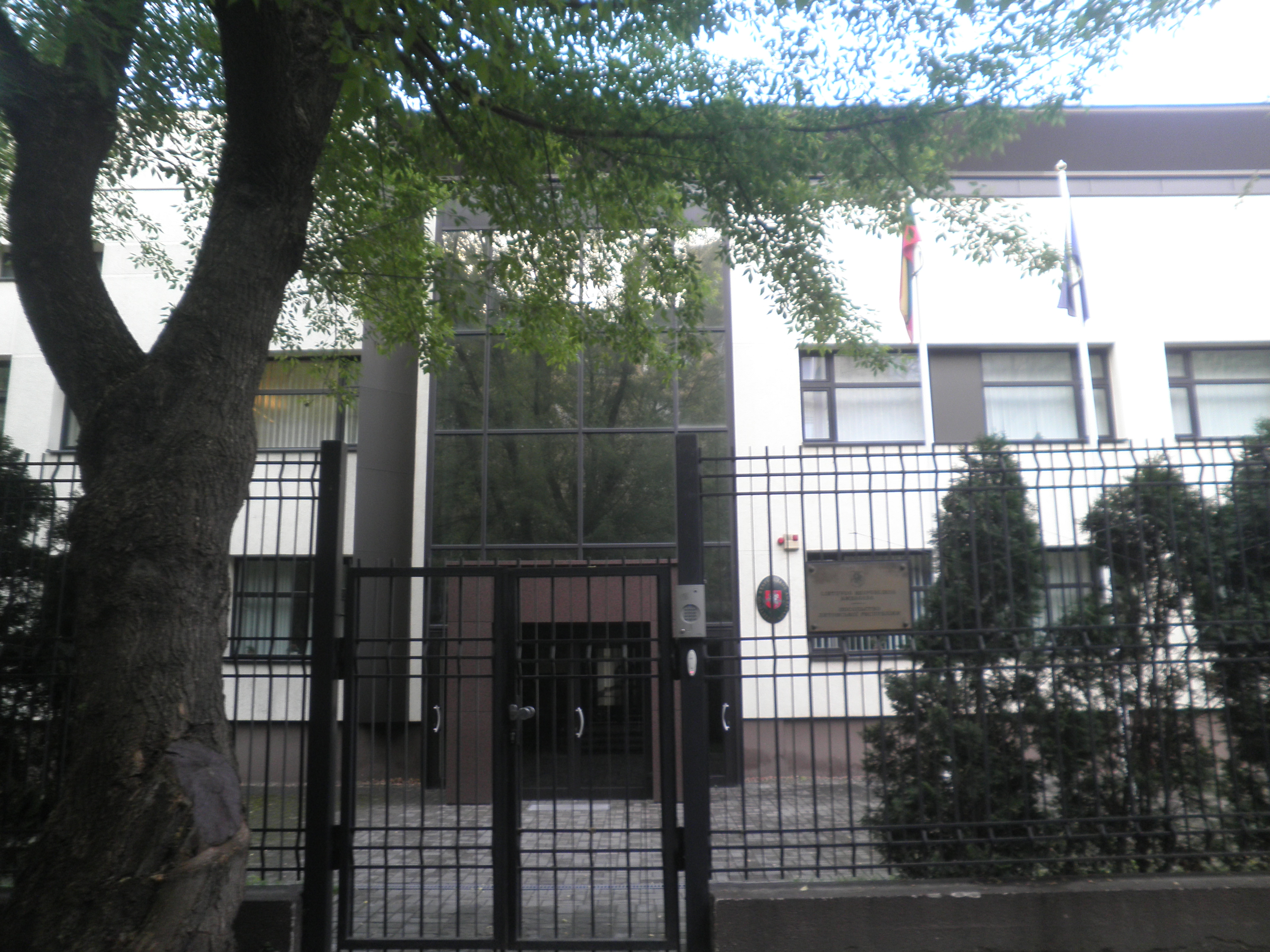
Embassy in Kyiv

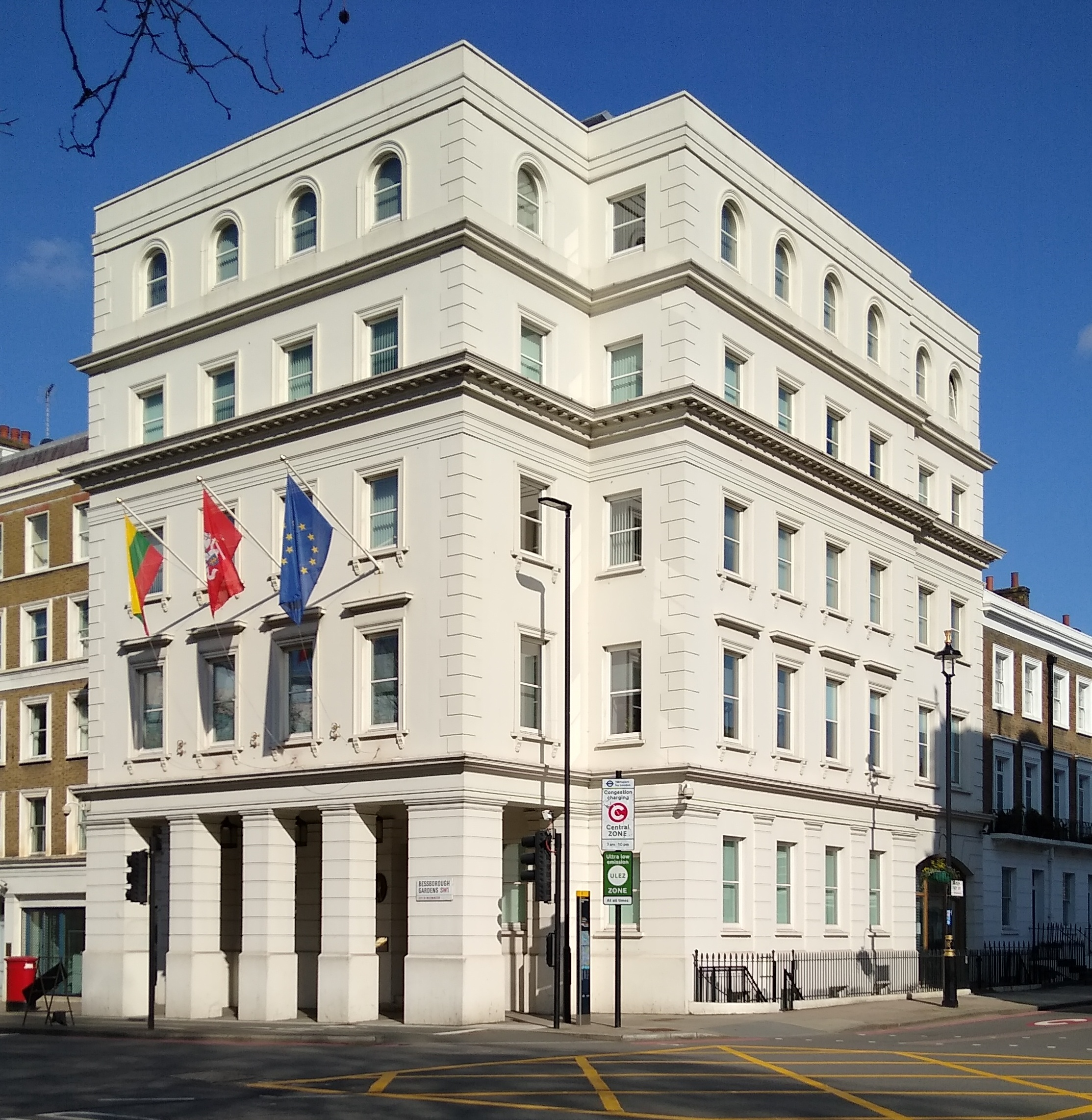
Embassy in London

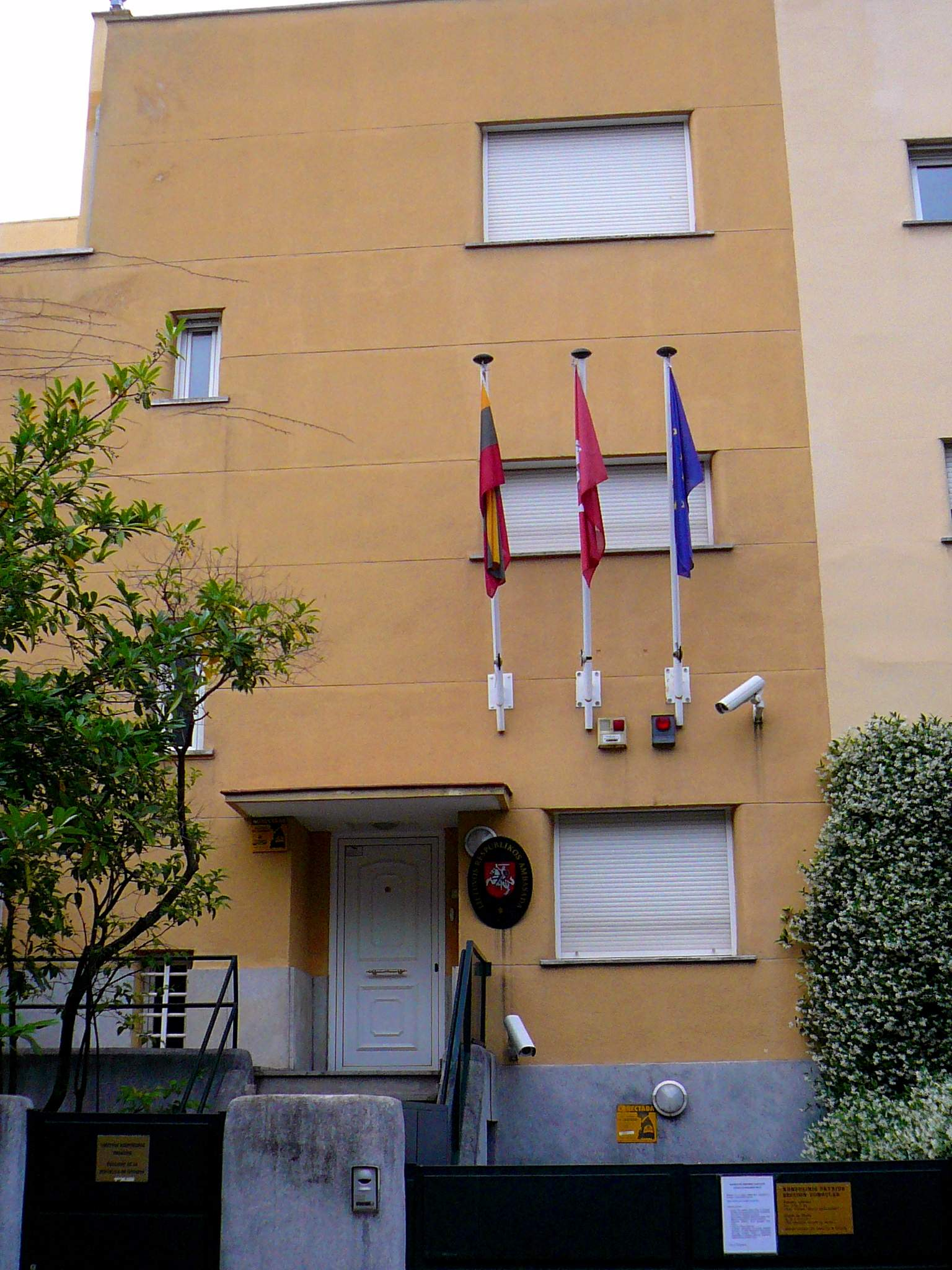
Embassy in Madrid

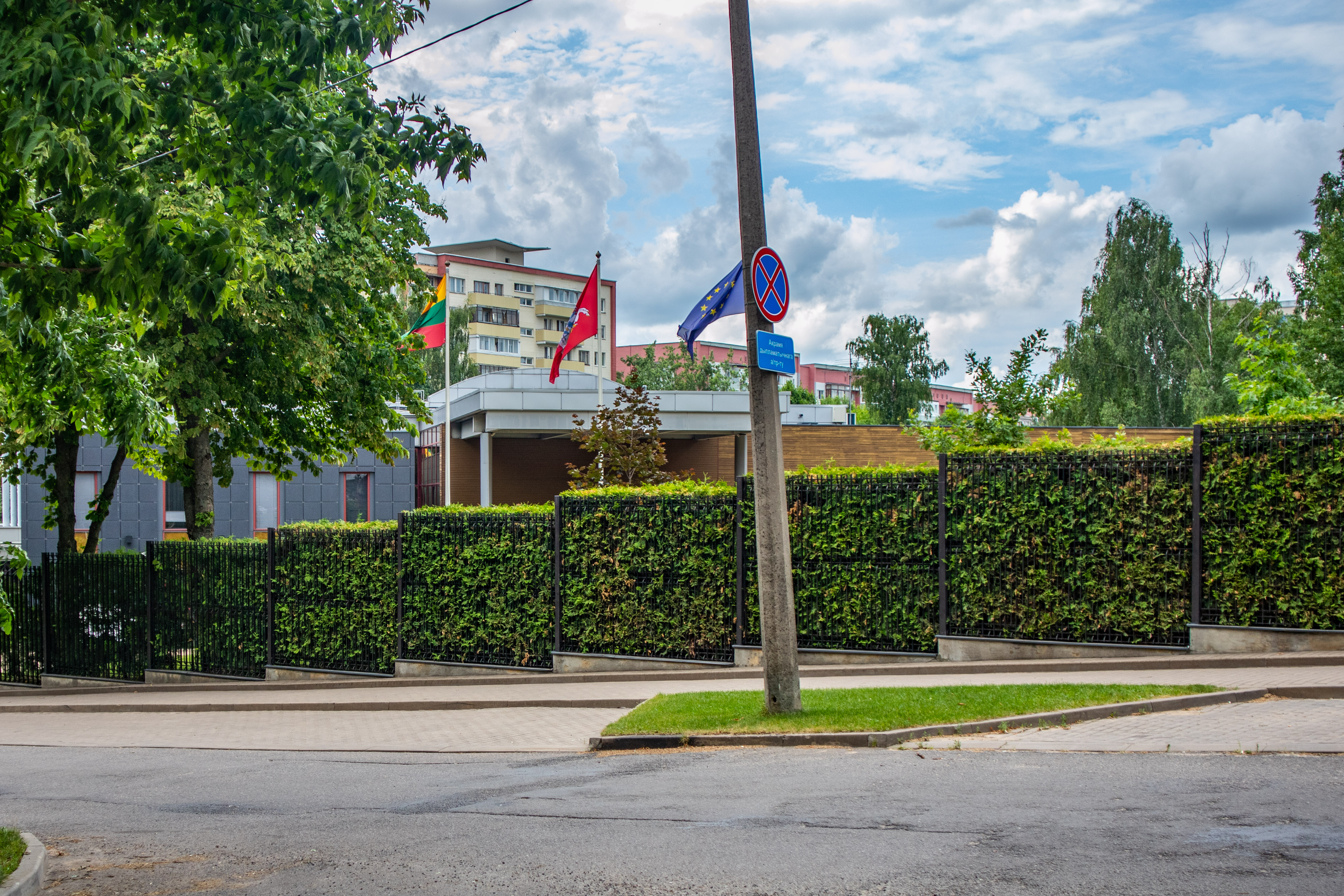
Embassy in Minsk

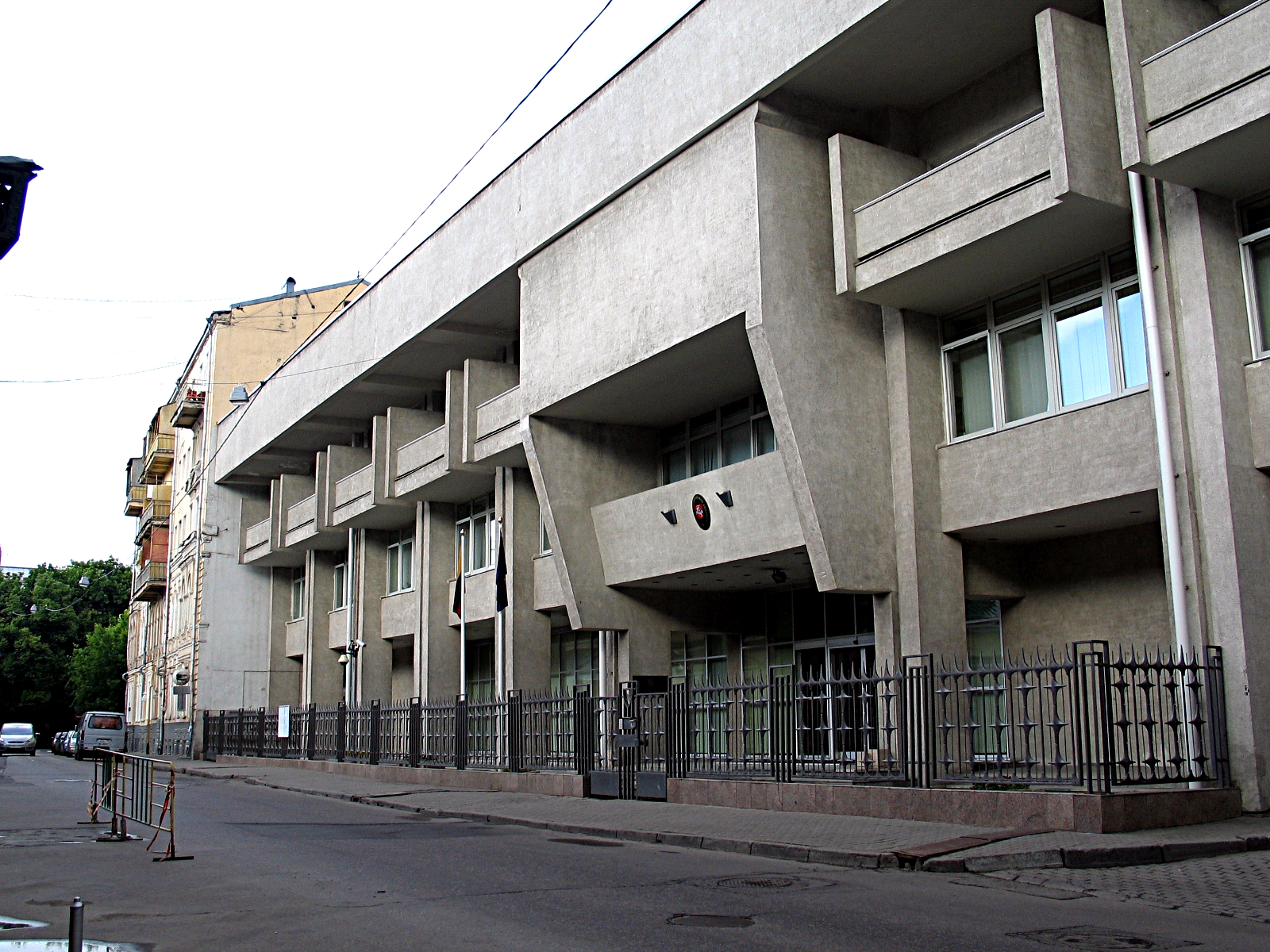
Embassy in Moscow

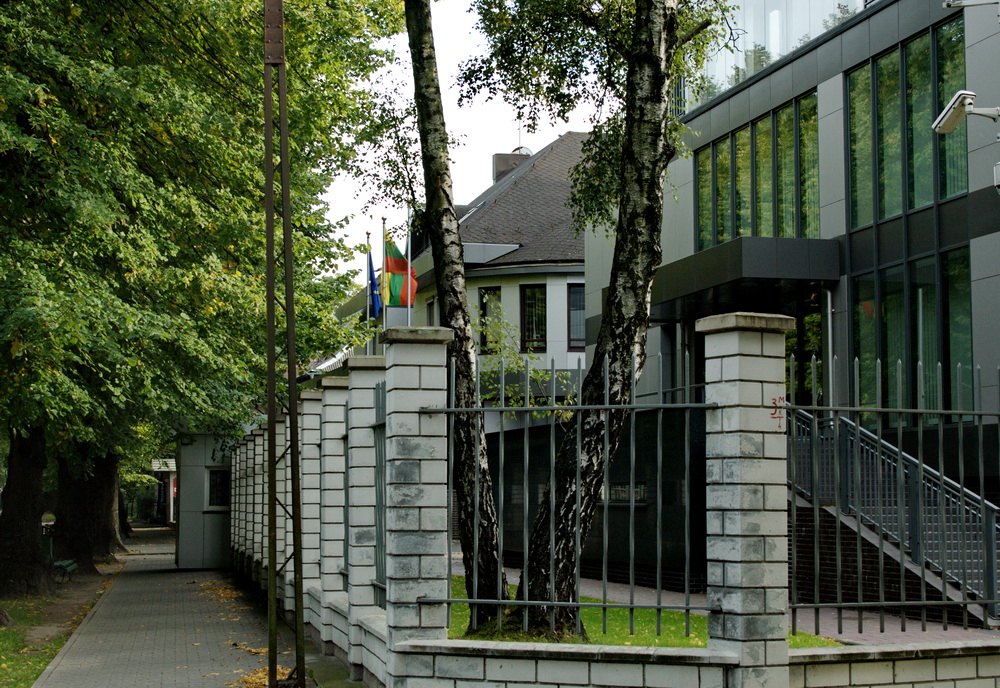
Consulate-General in Kaliningrad

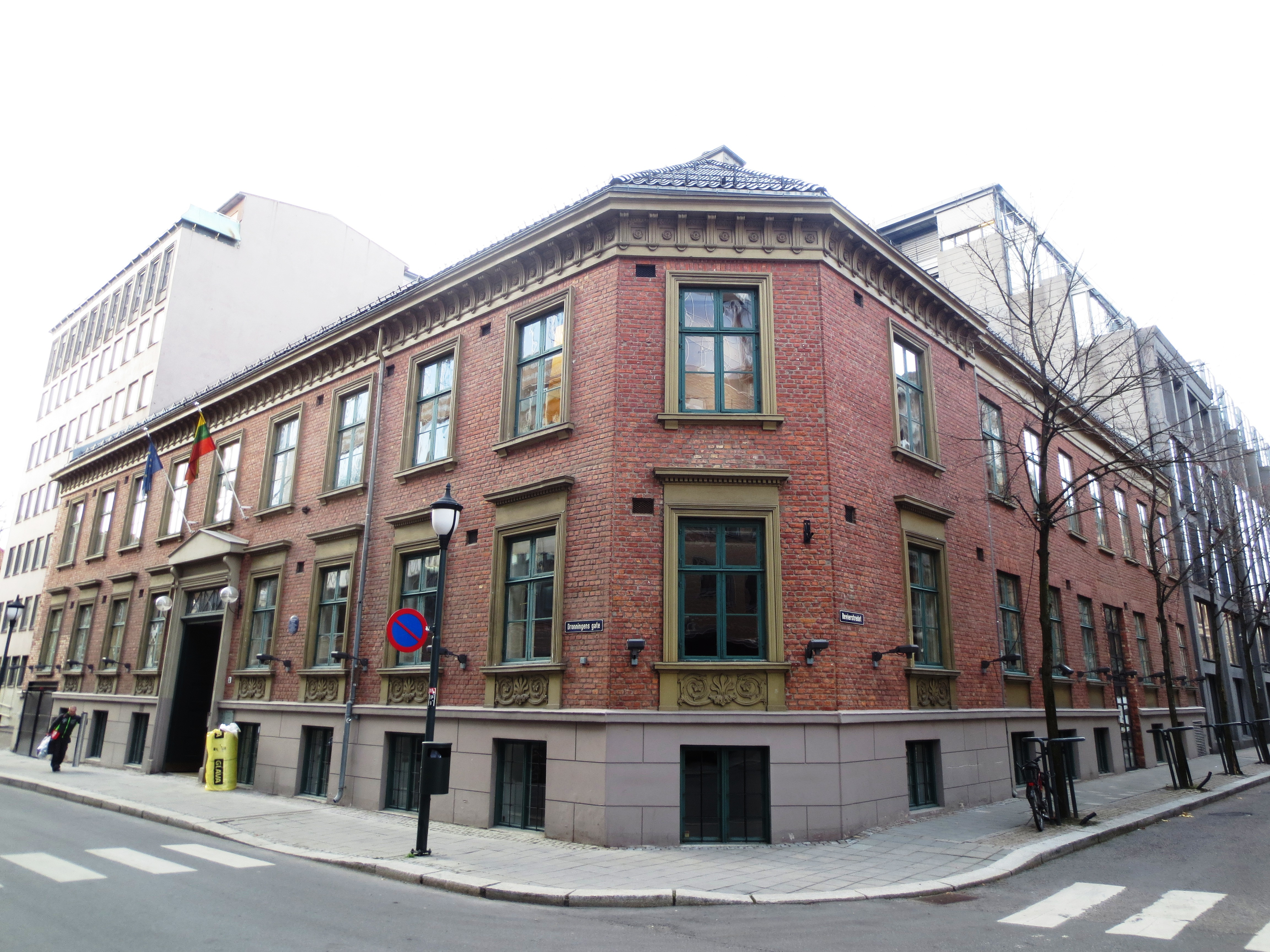
Embassy in Oslo

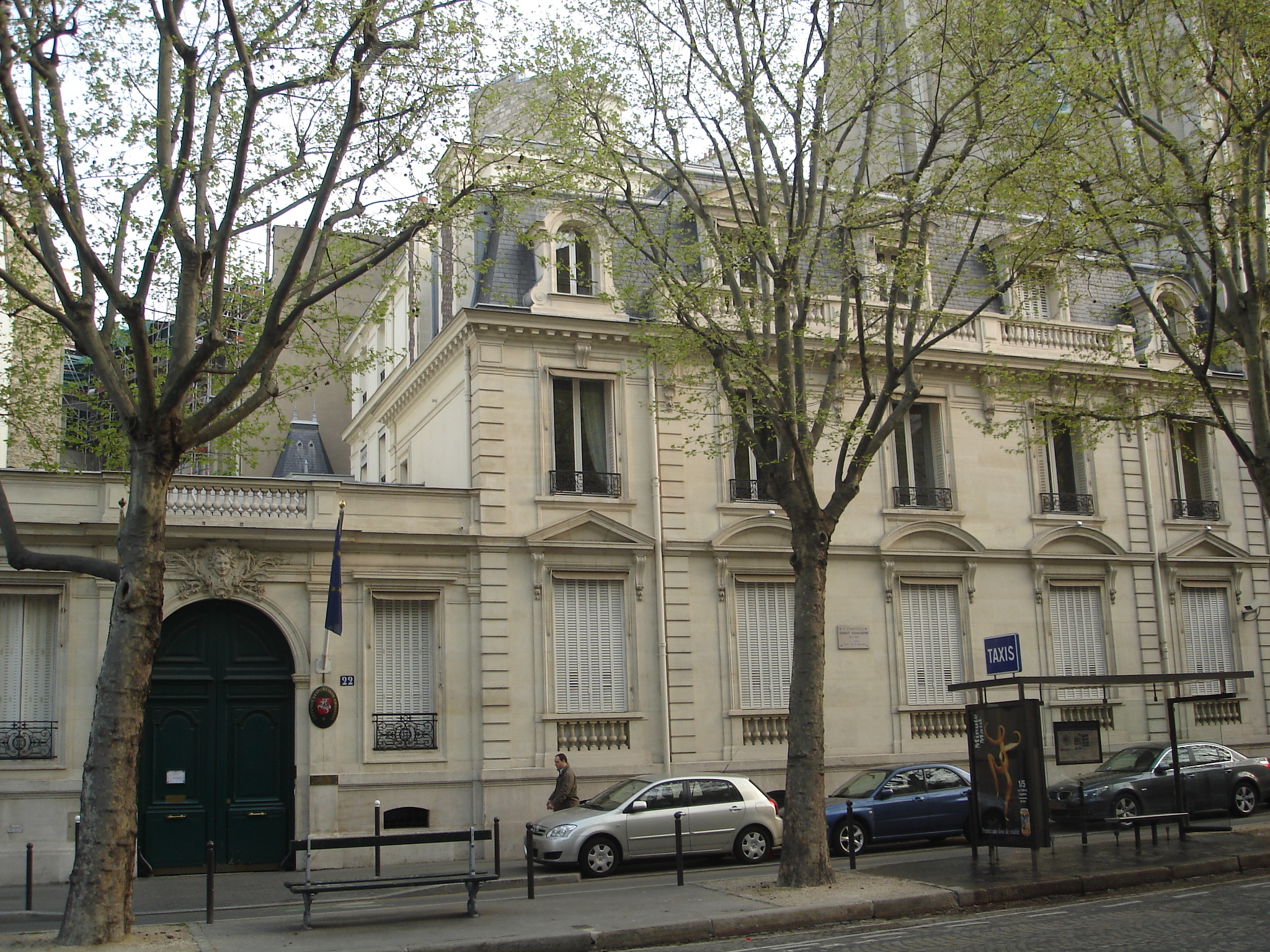
Embassy in Paris

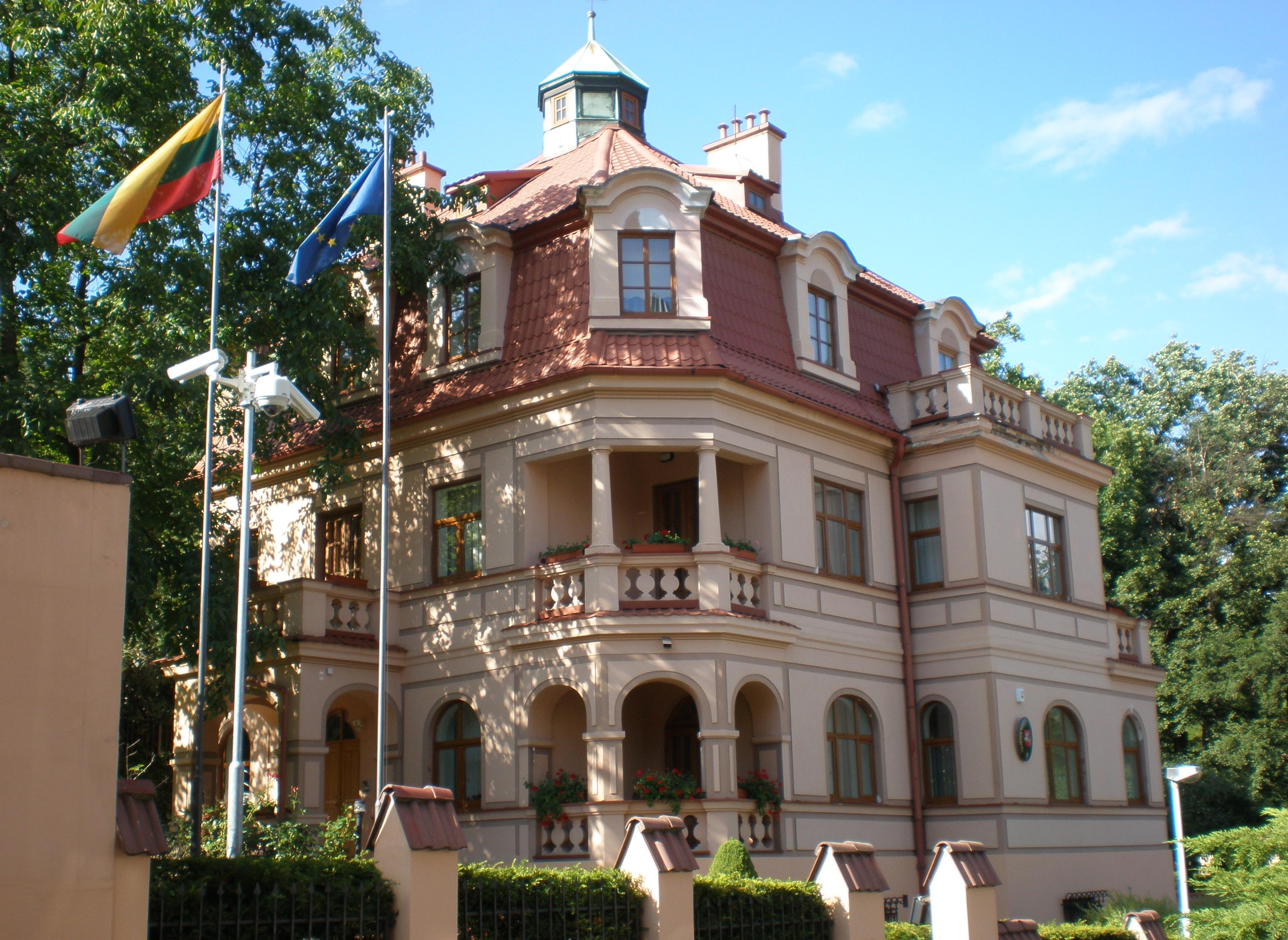
Embassy in Prague

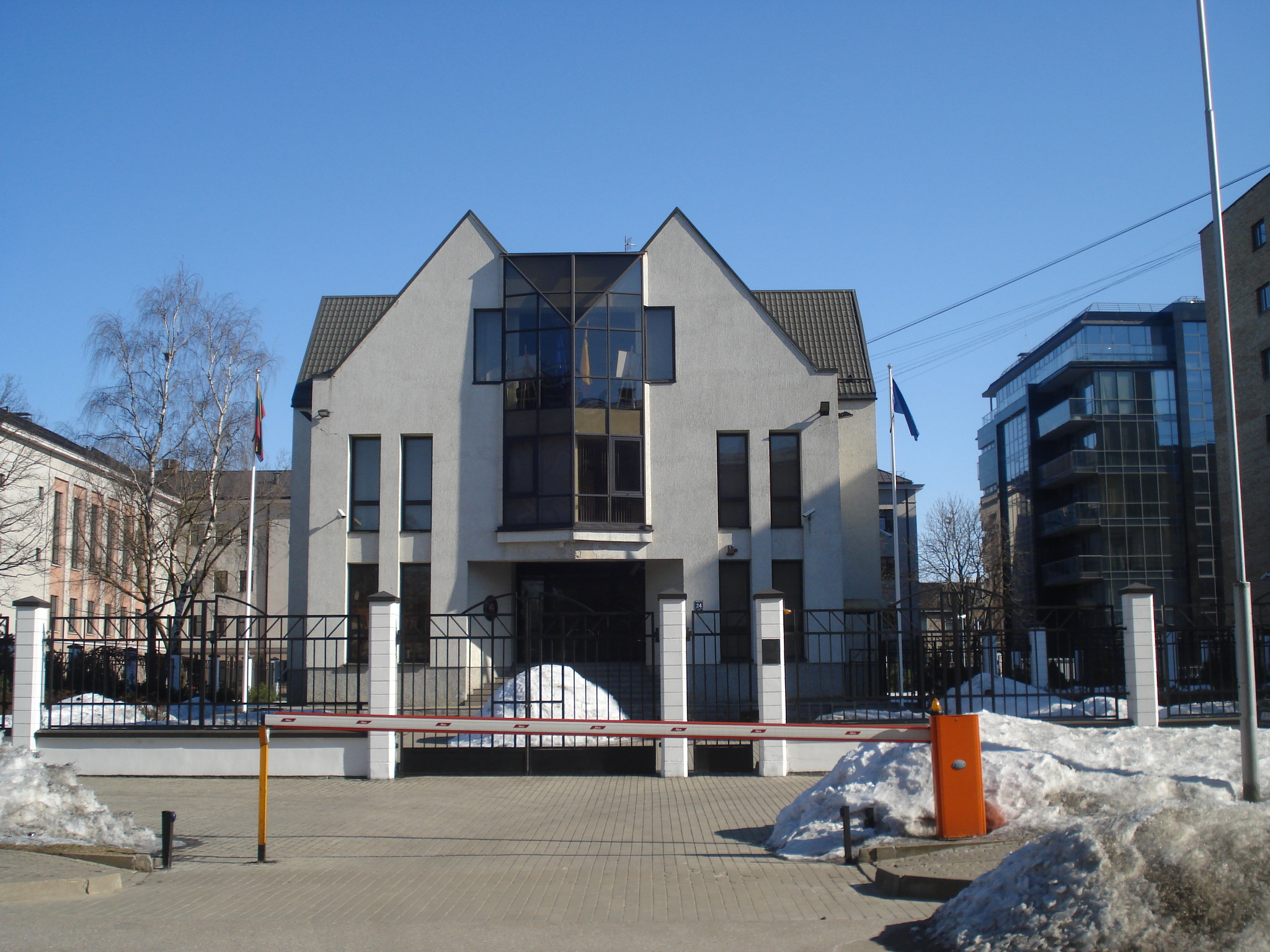
Embassy in Riga

Embassy in Seoul

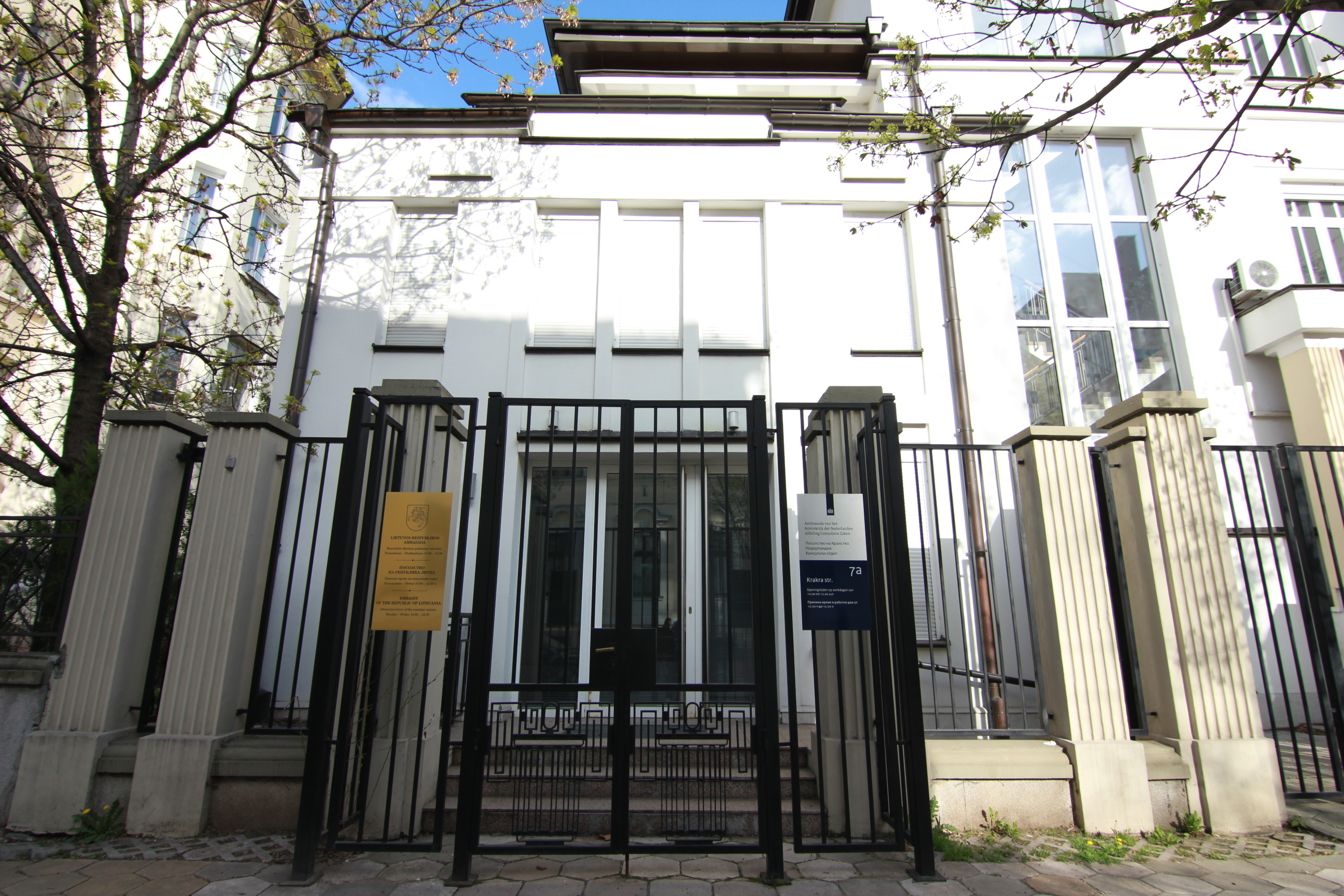
Embassy in Sofia

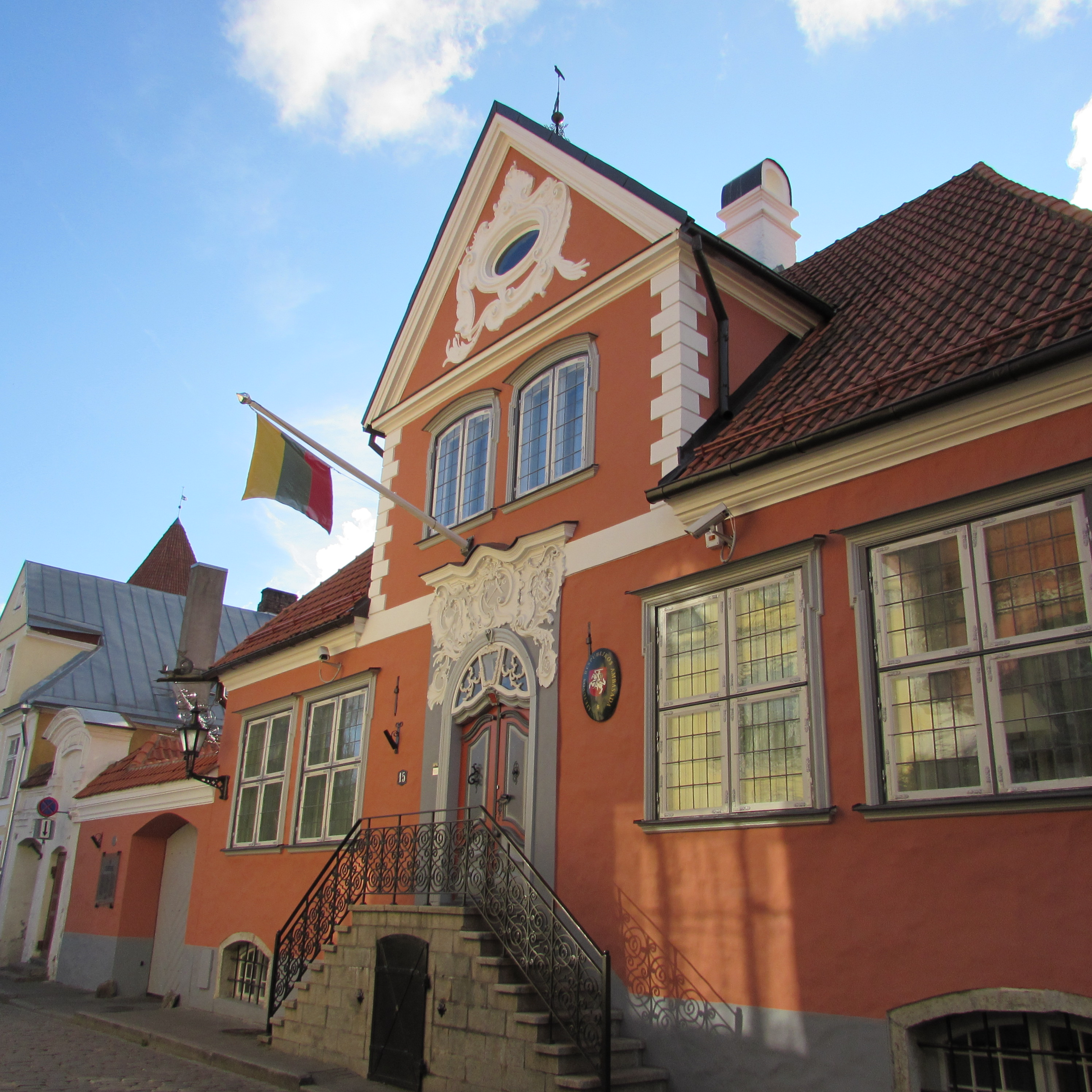
Embassy in Tallinn

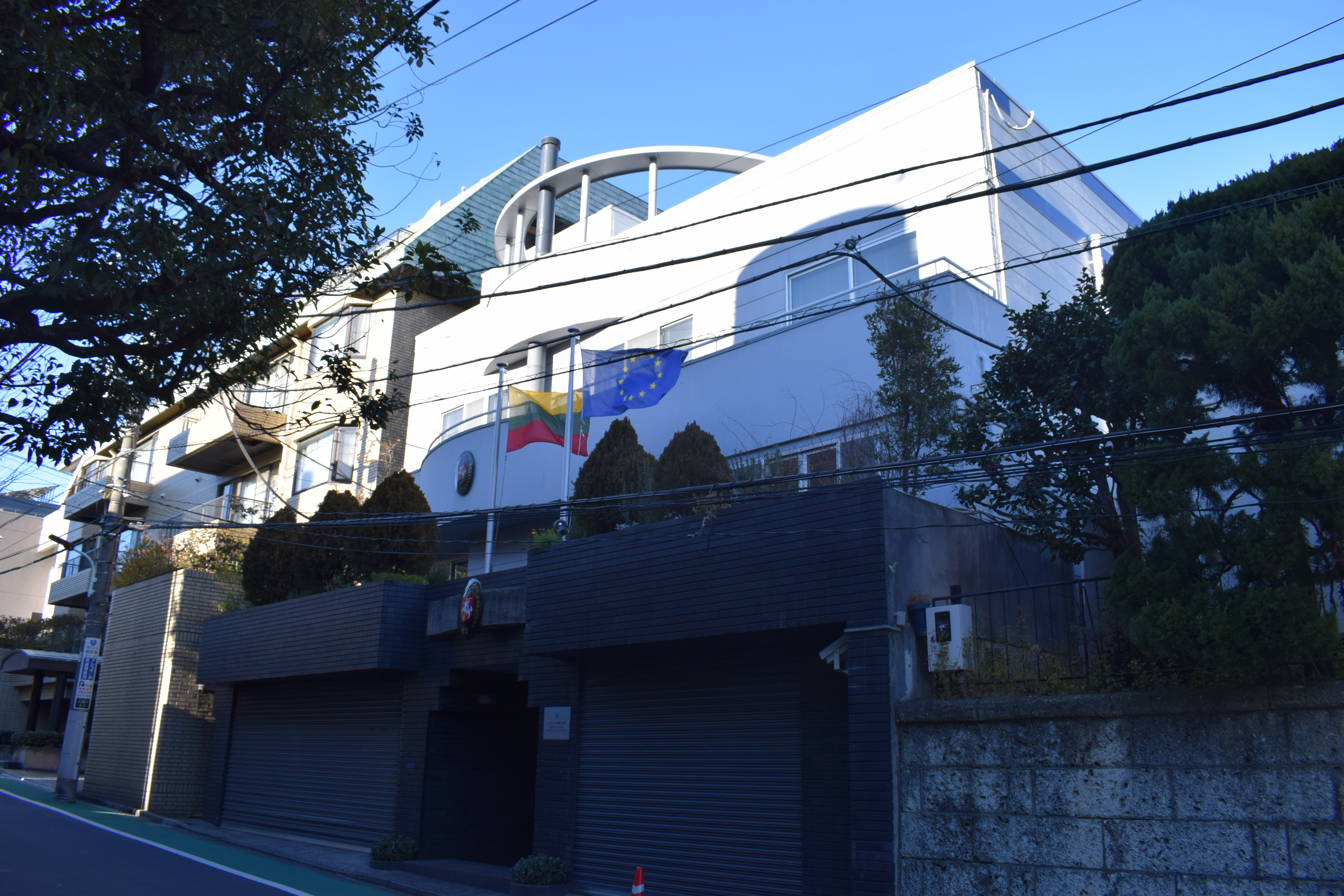
Embassy in Tokyo

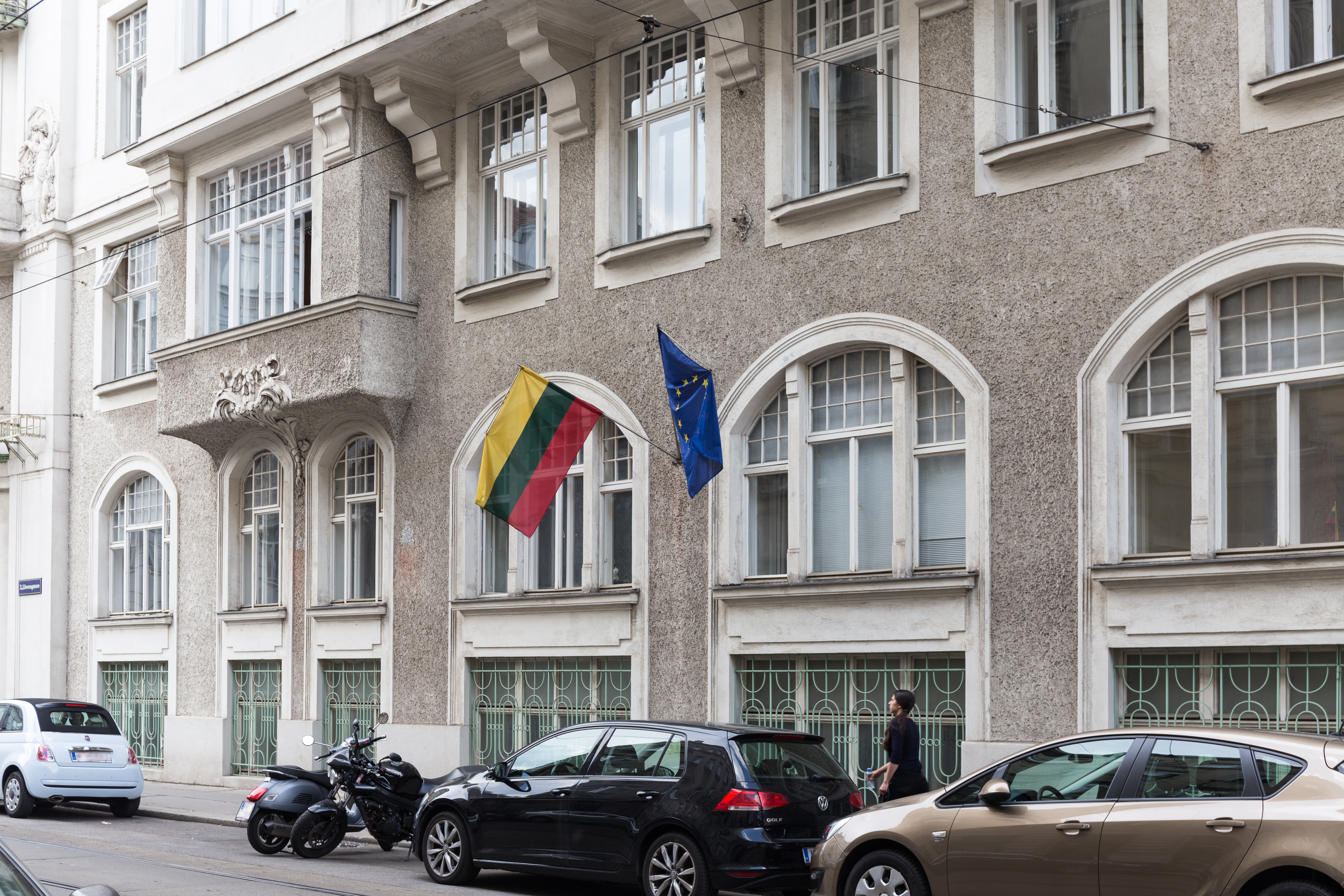
Embassy in Vienna

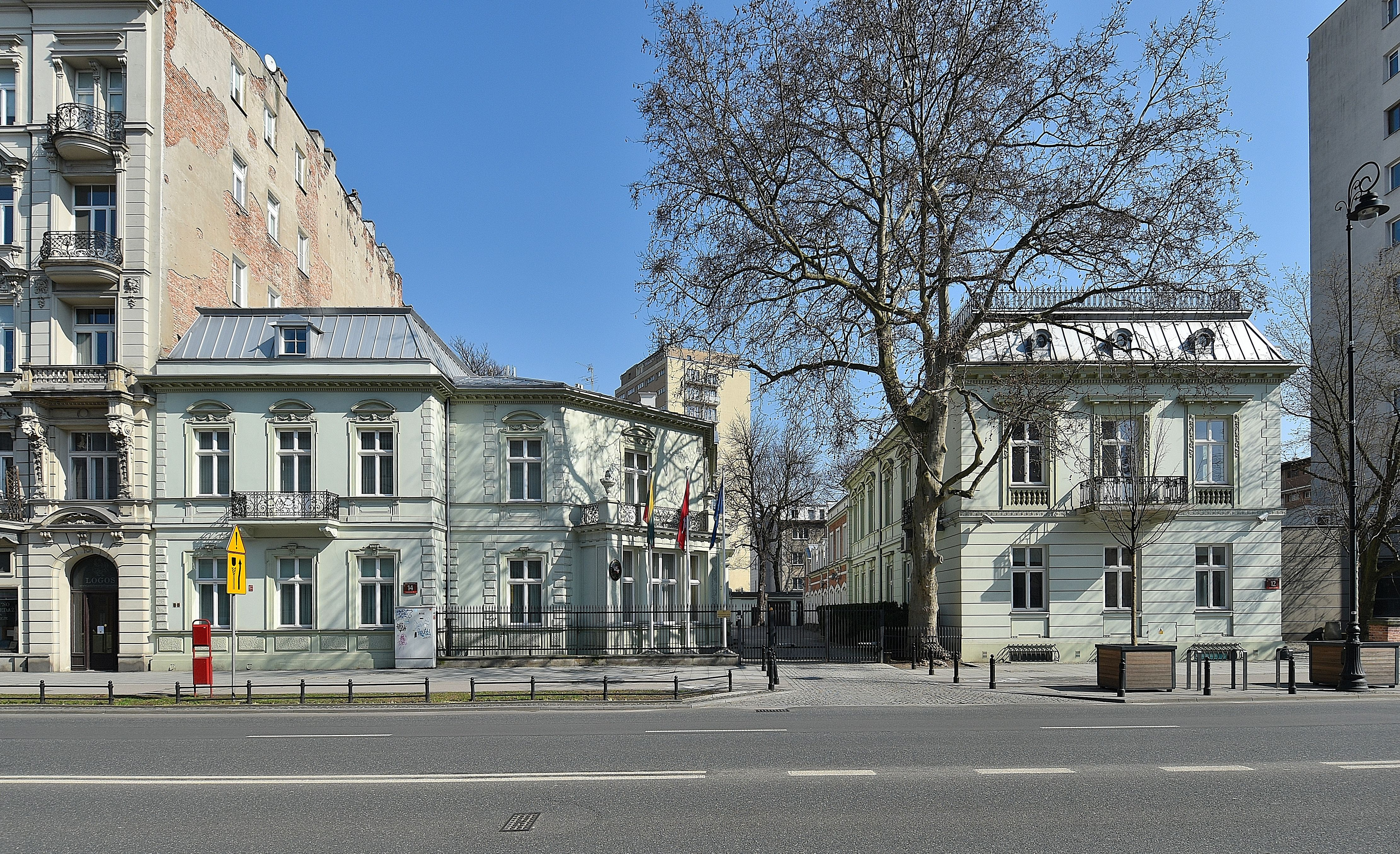
Embassy in Warsaw

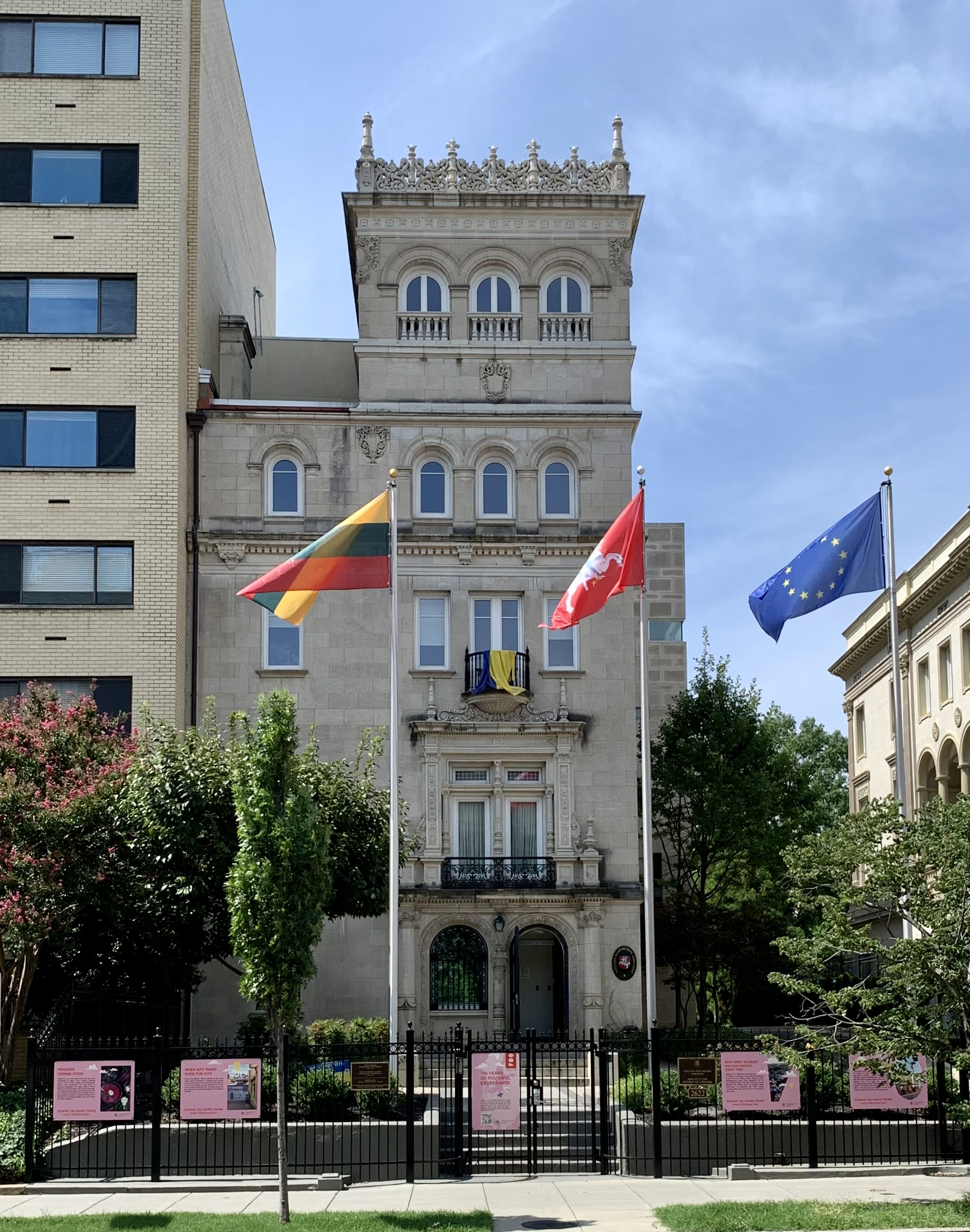
Embassy in Washington, D.C.

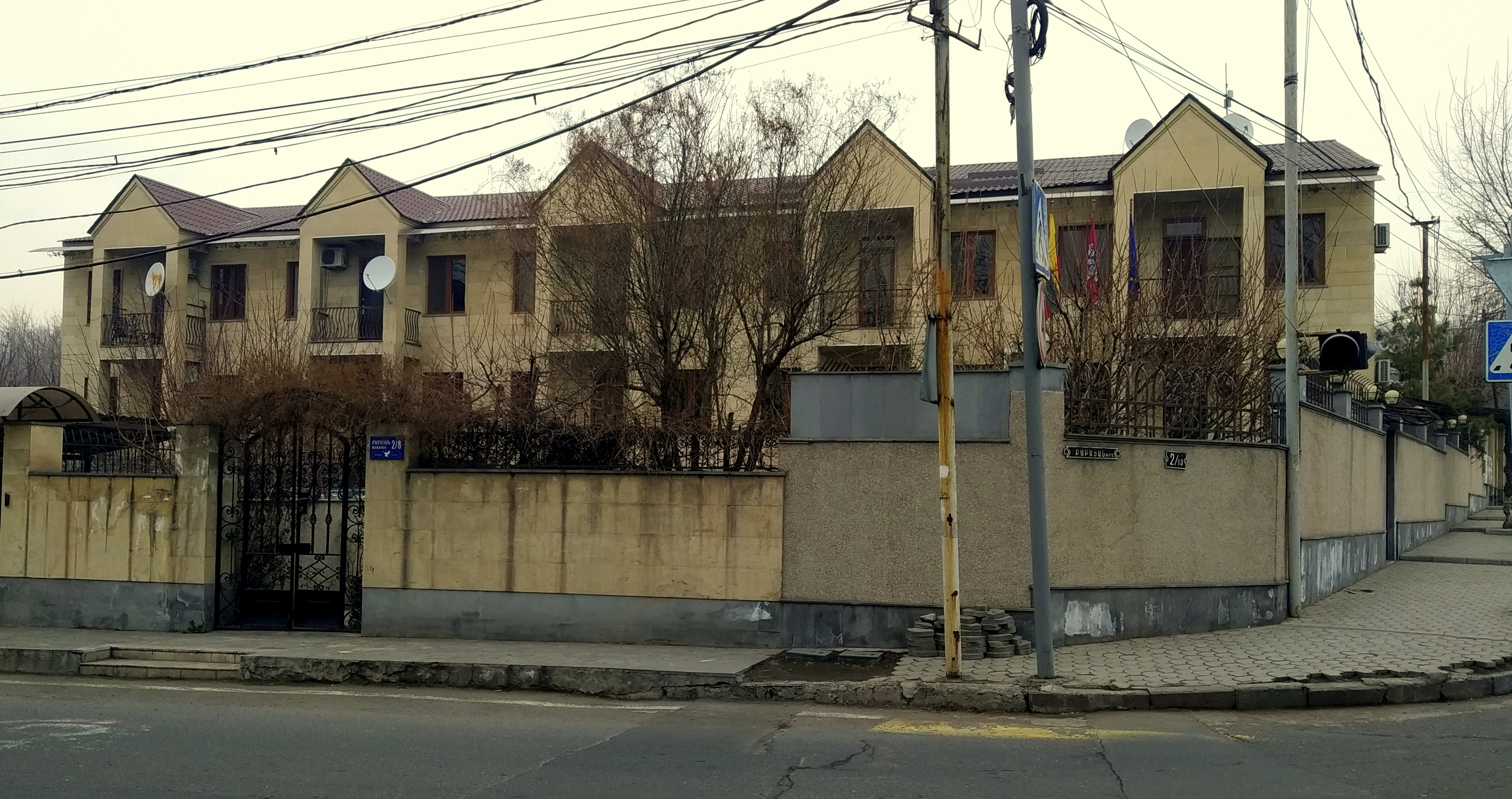
Embassy in Yerevan

== Missions to open ==
Host country	Host city	Mission	Ref.
Brazil	Brasília	Embassy	

== Closed missions ==
=== Americas ===
Host country	Host city	Mission	Year closed	Ref.
Argentina	Buenos Aires	Embassy	2012	

=== Asia ===
Host country	Host city	Mission	Year closed	Ref.
China	Beijing	Embassy	2021	

=== Europe ===
Host country	Host city	Mission	Year closed	Ref.
Bulgaria	Sofia	Embassy	2014	
Portugal	Lisbon	Embassy	2014	
Russia	Saint Petersburg	Consulate-General	2022	
Slovenia	Ljubljana	Embassy	2014	
Switzerland	Geneva	Consulate	2023	

=== Dual accreditations ===
Missions without or with no longer certainly assigned current dual accreditation. The list excludes any country mentioned in the main list above.

Country	Host country	Host city	Mission	Had since	Reason	Ref.
Myanmar	China	Beijing	Embassy	2016		

== See also ==
- Foreign relations of Lithuania
- List of diplomatic missions in Lithuania
- Visa policy of the Schengen Area
