= Embassy of the United Kingdom, Vilnius =

Diplomatic mission of United Kingdom to Lithuania

British Embassy, Vilnius
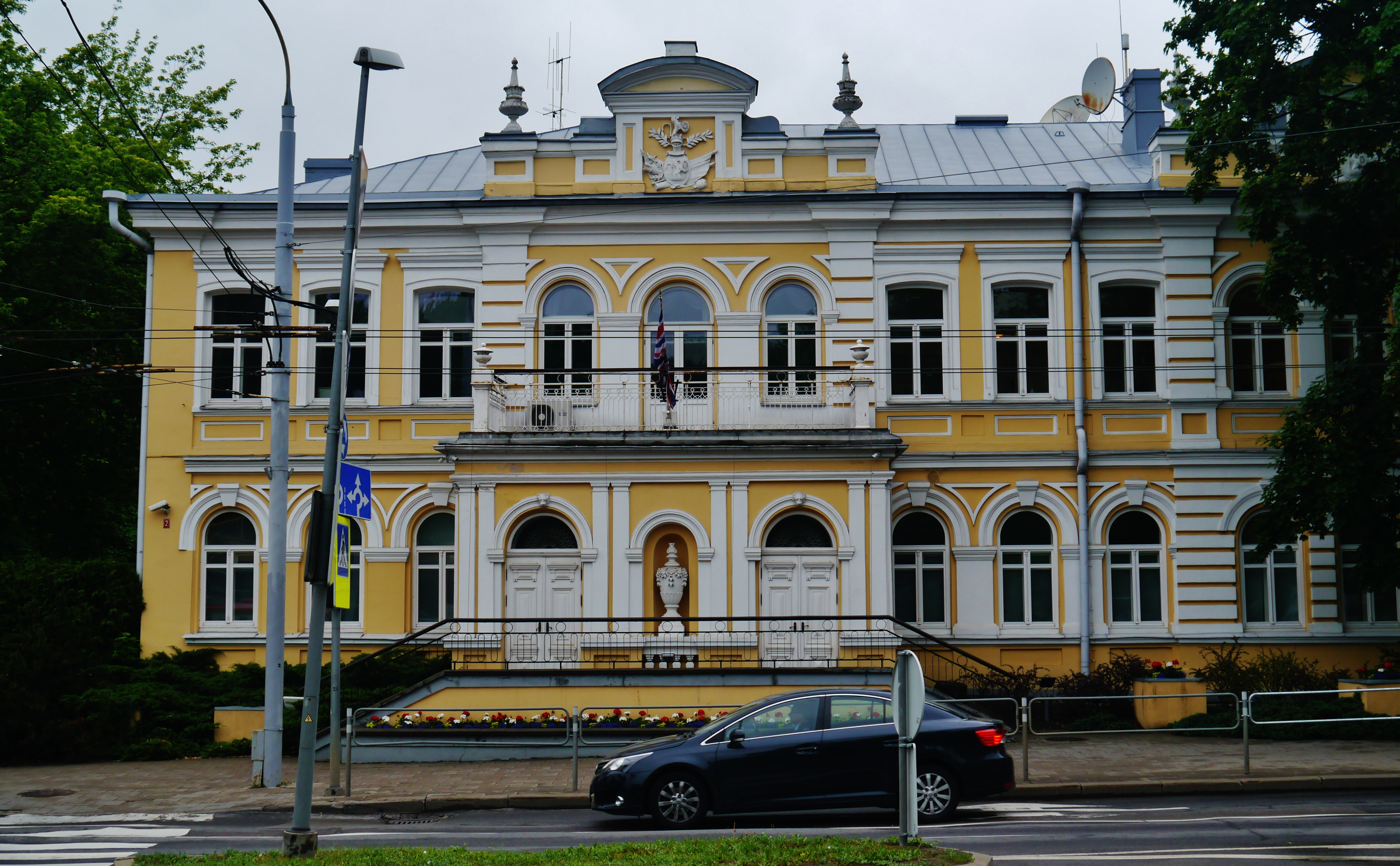
- The Embassy building in Vilnius
- Location: Vilnius, Lithuania
- Address: Antakalnio str. 2, Vilnius, LT-10308, Lithuania
- Coordinates: 54°41′38″N 25°18′17″E
- Ambassador: Liz Boyles
- Website: British Embassy, Vilnius

The Embassy of the United Kingdom in Vilnius is the chief diplomatic mission of the United Kingdom in Lithuania. The embassy is located on Antakalnio Street, opposite the St Peter and St Paul Church. Liz Boyles has been the British Ambassador to Lithuania since September 2024. The embassy also represents the British Overseas Territories in Lithuania.

The building is listed on the Lithuanian Register of Cultural Property.

== History ==
Between the First and Second World Wars the temporary capital of Lithuania was the city of Kaunas and the United Kingdom maintained a diplomatic representation there. The UK never recognised de jure the Soviet annexation of Lithuania in 1940.

The UK recognised Lithuania's restored independence on 27 August 1991. The British Embassy opened in Vilnius in October 1991 and moved to its current location on Antakalnio Street in April 1994. As well as the embassy in Vilnius, the UK also has an honorary consulate in Klaipėda.

== See also ==
- Lithuania–United Kingdom relations
- List of diplomatic missions in Lithuania
- List of Ambassadors of the United Kingdom to Lithuania
- Thomas Hildebrand Preston, 6th Baronet
