= List of diplomatic missions in Lithuania =

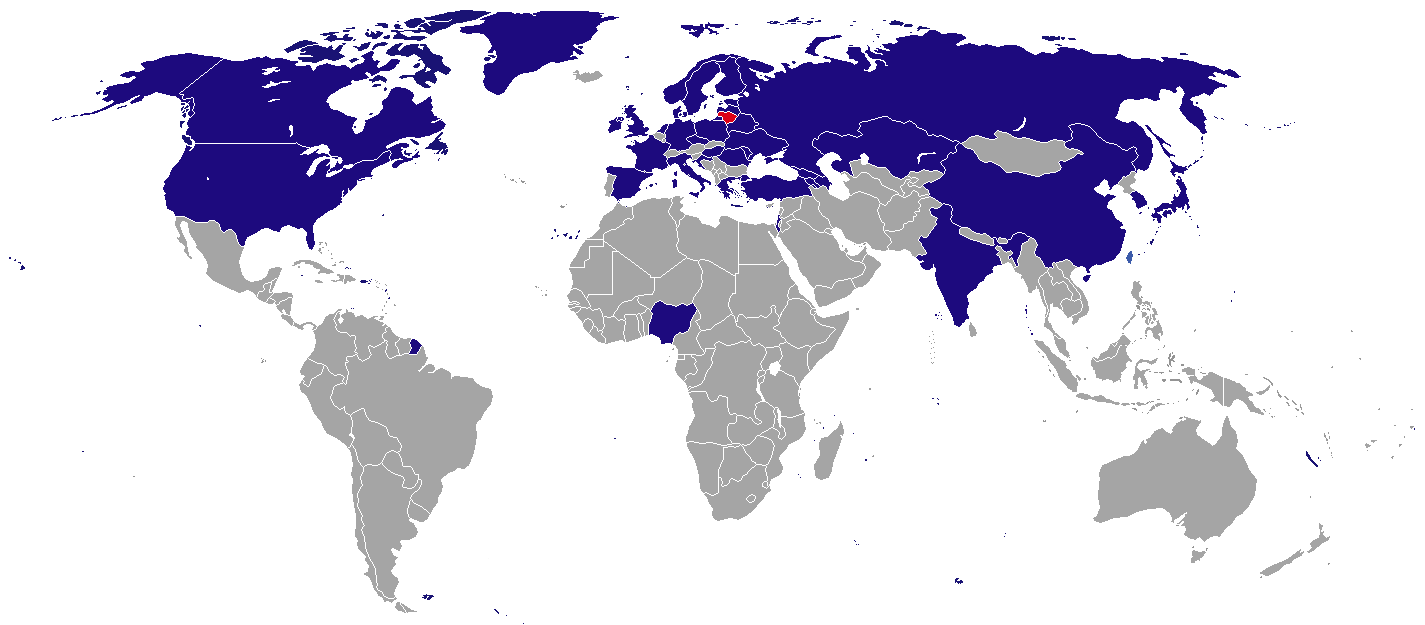
Map of diplomatic missions in Lithuania

This article lists diplomatic missions resident in Lithuania. At present, the capital city of Vilnius hosts 38 embassies. Several other countries have ambassadors accredited to Lithuania, with most being resident in Berlin, Copenhagen, Moscow, Warsaw or other Nordic capitals.

Honorary consulates and trade missions are omitted.

== Diplomatic missions in Vilnius ==
Country	Mission type	Photo
Armenia	Embassy	-
Azerbaijan	Embassy	
Belarus	Embassy	
Canada	Embassy	
China	Office of the Chargé d'Affaires	
Croatia	Embassy	-
Czech Republic	Embassy	
Denmark	Embassy	
Estonia	Embassy	
Finland	Embassy	-
France	Embassy	
Georgia	Embassy	
Germany	Embassy	
Greece	Embassy	
Holy See	Apostolic Nunciature	
Hungary	Embassy	
India	Embassy	
Ireland	Embassy	
Israel	Embassy	
Italy	Embassy	-
Japan	Embassy	
Kazakhstan	Embassy	
Latvia	Embassy	-
Moldova	Embassy	-
Netherlands	Embassy	-
Nigeria	Embassy	-
North Macedonia	Embassy	-
Norway	Embassy	-
Poland	Embassy	
Romania	Embassy	
Russia	Embassy	
South Korea	Embassy	
Sovereign Military Order of Malta	Embassy	
Spain	Embassy	
Sweden	Embassy	
Taiwan	Representative Office	
Turkey	Embassy	
Ukraine	Embassy	
United Kingdom	Embassy	
United States	Embassy	

== Non-resident embassies accredited to Lithuania ==
=== Resident in Berlin, Germany ===
1. Bahrain
2. Burkina Faso
3. Chad
4. Ecuador
5. Ghana
6. Guinea
7. Kuwait
8. Madagascar
9. Malawi
10. Mali
11. Mauritania
12. Niger
13. Paraguay
14. Togo

=== Resident in Copenhagen, Denmark ===
1. Bosnia and Herzegovina
2. Brazil
3. Egypt
4. Indonesia
5. Ivory Coast
6. Morocco
7. Nepal
8. Portugal
9. Saudi Arabia
10. Thailand
11. Uganda

=== Resident in Helsinki, Finland ===
1. Iceland
2. Namibia
3. Palestine
4. Peru
5. Uruguay

=== Resident in London, United Kingdom ===
1. Antigua and Barbuda
2. Guyana
3. Oman

=== Resident in Minsk, Belarus ===
1. Kyrgyzstan
2. Syria
3. Tajikistan
4. Turkmenistan

=== Resident in Riga, Latvia ===
1. Slovakia
2. Slovenia
3. Switzerland
4. United Arab Emirates
5. Uzbekistan

=== Resident in Stockholm, Sweden ===
1. Botswana
2. Dominican Republic
3. El Salvador
4. Kenya
5. Kosovo
6. Laos
7. Libya
8. Mexico
9. North Korea
10. South Africa
11. Sri Lanka
12. Tanzania
13. Zambia
14. Zimbabwe

=== Resident in The Hague, Netherlands ===
1. Burundi
2. Jordan
3. Rwanda

=== Resident in Warsaw, Poland ===
1. Afghanistan
2. Albania
3. Algeria
4. Angola
5. Argentina
6. Australia
7. Bangladesh
8. Belgium
9. Chile
10. Colombia
11. Cyprus
12. Guatemala
13. Iran
14. Iraq
15. Lebanon
16. Luxembourg
17. Malaysia
18. Mongolia
19. Montenegro
20. New Zealand
21. Pakistan
22. Philippines
23. Qatar
24. Senegal
25. Serbia
26. Tunisia
27. Vietnam

=== Resident in other cities ===
1. Andorra (Andorra la Vella)
2. Austria (Vienna) (Note: The ambassador is based in the headquarters of the Austrian foreign ministry, in Vienna.)
3. Bulgaria (Sofia) (Note: The ambassador is based in the headquarters of the Bulgarian foreign ministry, in Sofia.)
4. Cambodia (Sofia)
5. Gabon (Moscow)
6. Honduras (Brussels)
7. Malta (Valletta) (Note: The ambassador is based in the headquarters of the Maltese foreign ministry, in Valletta.)
8. Myanmar (Vienna)
9. San Marino (City of San Marino) (Note: The ambassador is based in the headquarters of the Sanmarinese foreign ministry, in the City of San Marino.)
10. Sierra Leone (Moscow)
11. Venezuela (Oslo)

=== Unverified ===
- Ethiopia (Brussels)
- Benin (Copenhagen)
- Barbados (Dublin)
- Maldives (Berlin)
- Nicaragua (Helsinki)
- Panama (Warsaw)

== Closed missions ==
Host city	Sending country	Mission	Year closed	Ref.
Vilnius	Austria	Embassy	2018	
Vilnius	Belgium	Embassy	2015	
Vilnius	Bulgaria	Embassy	2011	
Vilnius	China	Embassy (Note: Continued to operate as an "Embassy Office")	2021	
Vilnius	Portugal	Embassy	2012	
Kaunas	Empire of Japan	Consulate	1940	
Klaipėda	Russia	Consulate-General	2022	

== See also ==
- Foreign relations of Lithuania
- List of diplomatic missions of Lithuania
