= Thomas Hildebrand Preston =

British diplomat (1886–1976)

Sir Thomas Hildebrand Preston, 6th Baronet, OBE (2 June 1886 – 30 December 1976) was a British diplomat. He was a posthumous recipient of the British Hero of the Holocaust award for saving Jewish lives in Lithuania in 1940 by issuing documents that permitted them to travel. He was consul in Ekaterinburg in Russia at the time of the murder of the Romanov family there in July 1918.

== Life ==
Thomas Hildebrand Preston was born in Epping, Essex, the son of William Thomas Preston and of Alice Mary née Stevens. He was a grandson of Sir Jacob Henry Preston, 2nd Baronet Preston. He immigrated to New Zealand with his father who started farming at Timaru, but was educated in England at Westminster School and at Trinity Hall, Cambridge where he studied Russian. He later studied at the Ecole des Sciences Politiques in Paris, and the Ludwig-Maximilians-Universität München. Preston lost an eye due to a school cricket injury and wore a monocle over his good eye.

=== Career ===
==== Russia and Turin ====
Around 1910, he joined the United Kingdom Diplomatic Service. On 23 May 1913, he was appointed British vice-consul in Ekaterinburg in Russia. On 29 July 1916, he was appointed consul for Perm, the Western Siberian government of Tobolsk and the Territory of Akmolinsk, still with his residence in Ekaterinburg. He was there in July 1918 at the time of the murder of the Romanov family and was haunted later by the idea that he might have been able to save the Russian royal family. At a telegraph office on 18 July, he attempted to send the message "The Tsar Nicholas the Second was shot last night" to the Foreign Secretary Arthur Balfour; the Bolshevik military commissar Filipp Goloshchyokin struck out Preston's text, rewriting "The hangman Tsar Nicholas was shot last night – a fate he richly deserved."

In October 1919, he was transferred to Vladivostok to perform intelligence duties and on 30 October 1919, he was appointed as consul there. He was then employed for a time in the Overseas Trade Department of the British Foreign Office in London.

On 4 August 1922, Preston was assigned to the British Trade Mission to Moscow. After the conclusion of the same, he was appointed as the British consul in Petrograd in November 1922. Following the temporary severance of the United Kingdom's diplomatic relations with the Soviet Union in 1927, he left on 3 June 1927, being transferred to the post of consul in Turin, which he held from 23 September 1927 to 3 July 1929.

==== Lithuania and later ====
On 7 December 1929, Preston was appointed "His Majesty's Consul for the Republic of Lithuania, including the Memel Territory (Klaipedas Krastas)", residing at Kaunas (Kovno), the temporary capital of Lithuania. In this position he was promoted to secretary 2nd class on 10 February 1930, secretary 1st class on 17 July 1935 and counsellor in the Diplomatic Service on 1 December. He was appointed Officer of the Order of the British Empire (OBE) in 1934. On 12 June 1940, he was promoted to envoy extraordinary and minister plenipotentiary.

In this position, he provided 800 Jews with legal travel certificates, a few hundred of which were able to cross the Baltic Sea to neutral Sweden. He also assisted an additional 400 Lithuanian Jews to escape to Mandatory Palestine in 1940 by issuing them illegal Palestine certificates, thus enabling them to leave for the Middle East via Turkey. This was irregular, as it greatly exceeded the number approved by the British government for immigrants to Palestine. At least 400 forged copies of the Preston visas were discovered by British officials in Istanbul. Other diplomats in Kaunas that issued documents that permitted Jews to travel included Chiune Sugihara of Japan and Jan Zwartendijk, honorary consul of the Netherlands. Students of the Mir Yeshiva were among those enabled to travel.

In 1940, Preston was placed on 'the Black Book' (Sonderfahndungsliste G.B. "Special Search List Great Britain"), a list of 2820 persons who were to be arrested by the SS in the event of a German occupation of Britain.

In September 1940, he was transferred to Istanbul on the dissolution of his previous post following the Soviet occupation of Lithuania and de facto loss of Lithuanian independence. From 18 June 1941 to 1948, he held the post of counsellor at the British Embassy in Cairo. He retired in 1948.

=== Personal life ===
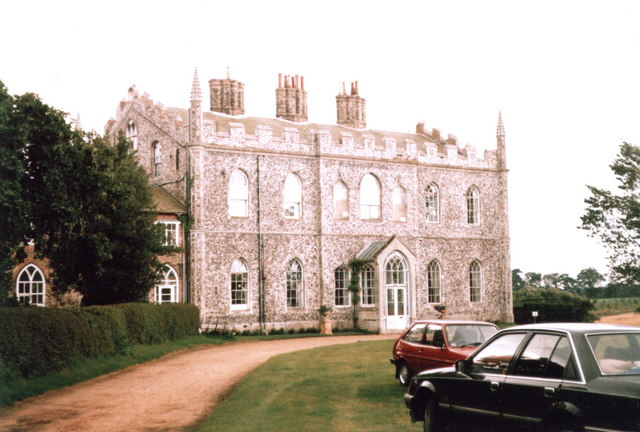
Beeston Hall in Norfolk

He married Ella Henrietta von Shickandantz (1889 – 1989) on 3 October 1913. While in Petrograd she acquired some Soviet propaganda porcelain.

Preston was a capable musician who studied harmony, counterpoint and orchestration under noted Russian musicians. In 1937 he wrote White Roses, a ballet in one act, that was performed at the Kaunas State Theatre, as well as a piano score for a second ballet, The Dwarf Grenadier. In 1958, Preston composed a ceremonial march intended to accompany visitors to NATO headquarters at the Palais de Chaillot, Paris.

Before his appointment to Lithuania, Preston had worked as a gold prospector in the Ural Mountains and maintained mining interests. He wrote the book Before the Curtain (1950). He succeeded as the 6th Baronet Preston, of Beeston St Lawrence, Norfolk on 7 December 1963 with the death of a cousin. He lived at Beeston Hall.

He was a posthumous recipient of the British Hero of the Holocaust award in January 2018 for saving Jewish lives. Preston's efforts were recognised in 2018 in the exhibition "Building Bridges" at the Embassy of the United Kingdom, Vilnius, and in 2022 at the Kaunas Holocaust Memorial Day.

Some of Preston's papers are held at the University of Leeds Special Collections.

== See also ==
- The Holocaust in Lithuania
