= Embassy of Lithuania, London =

Diplomatic mission of Lithuania to United Kingdom

Embassy of Lithuania in London
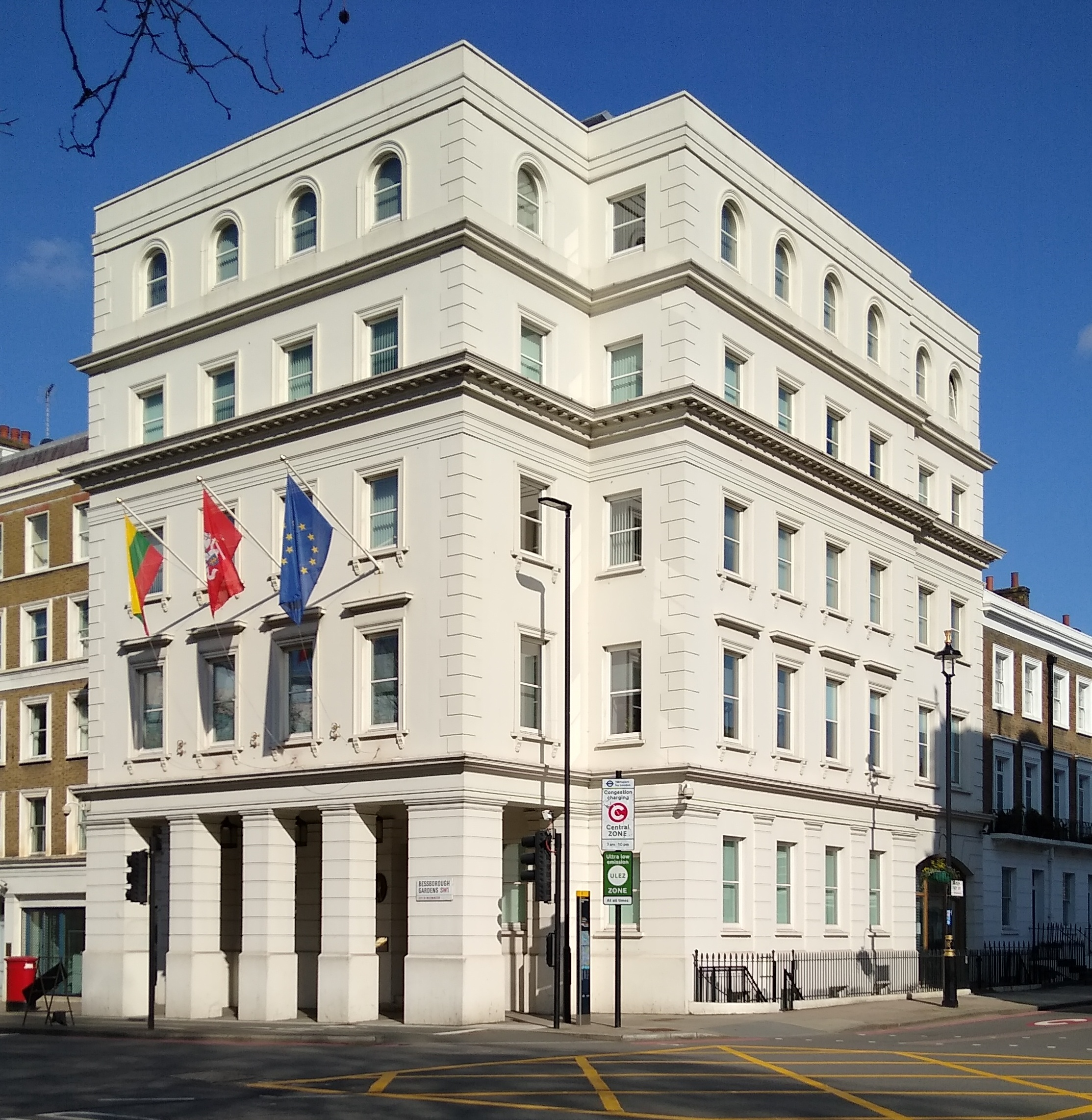
- Location: Pimlico, Westminster, London
- Address: 2 Bessborough Gardens, London, SW1V 2JE
- Coordinates: 51°29′22″N 0°7′51″W

Embassy of Lithuania in London is the diplomatic mission of Lithuania in the United Kingdom.

Originally based in Gloucester Place in Marylebone, the Embassy moved to its current location in Bessborough Gardens, Pimlico in 2011. The Bessborough Gardens embassy is also the base of Lithuania's missions to the Sultanate of Oman, the African Union, the Republic of Ethiopia and Portugal.

In May 2016 Lithuania, also opened an honorary consulate situated in the historic building of Ingress Abbey, Greenhithe, Kent.

== Gallery ==
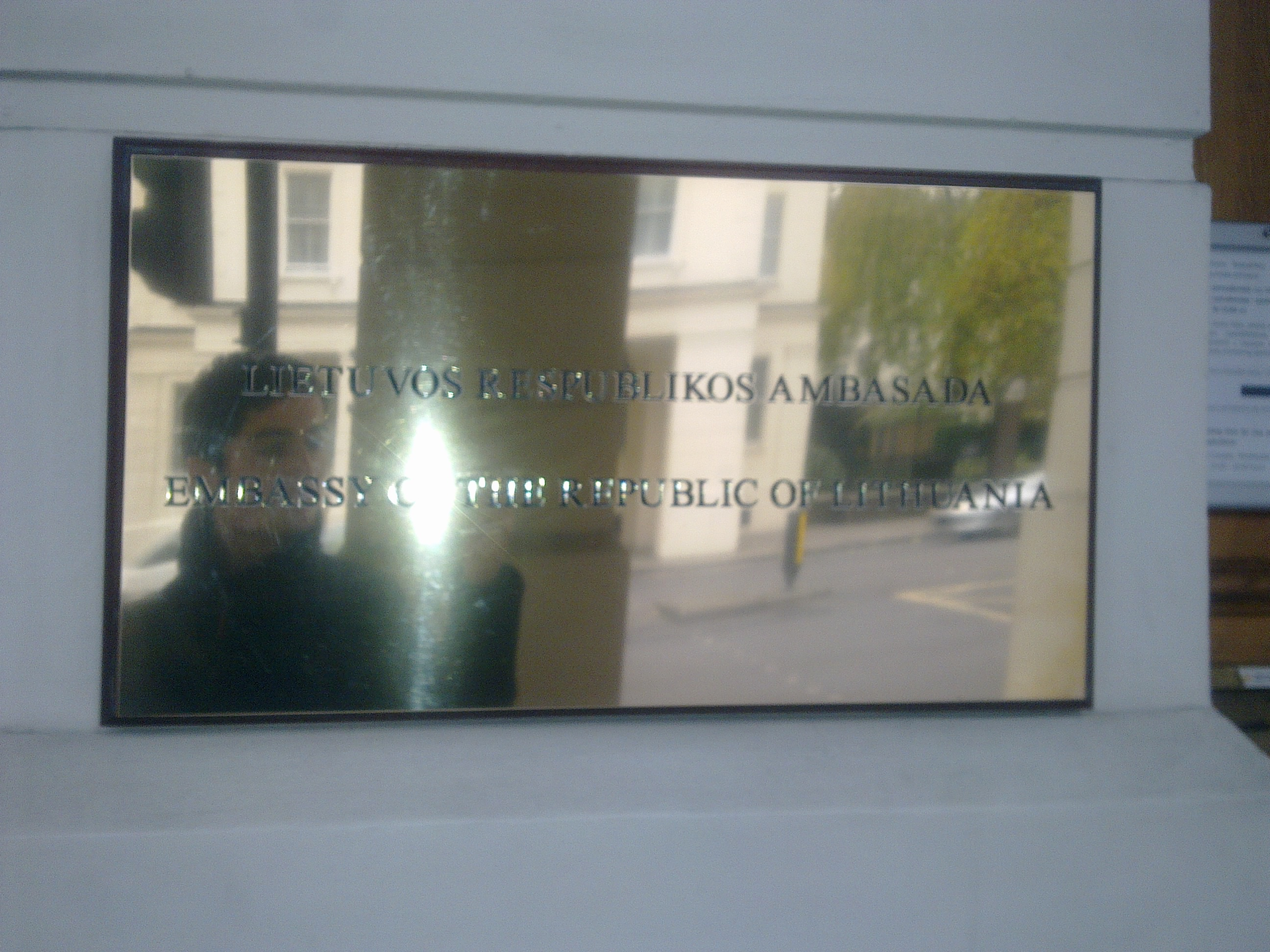
Plaque outside the embassy in English and Lithuanian

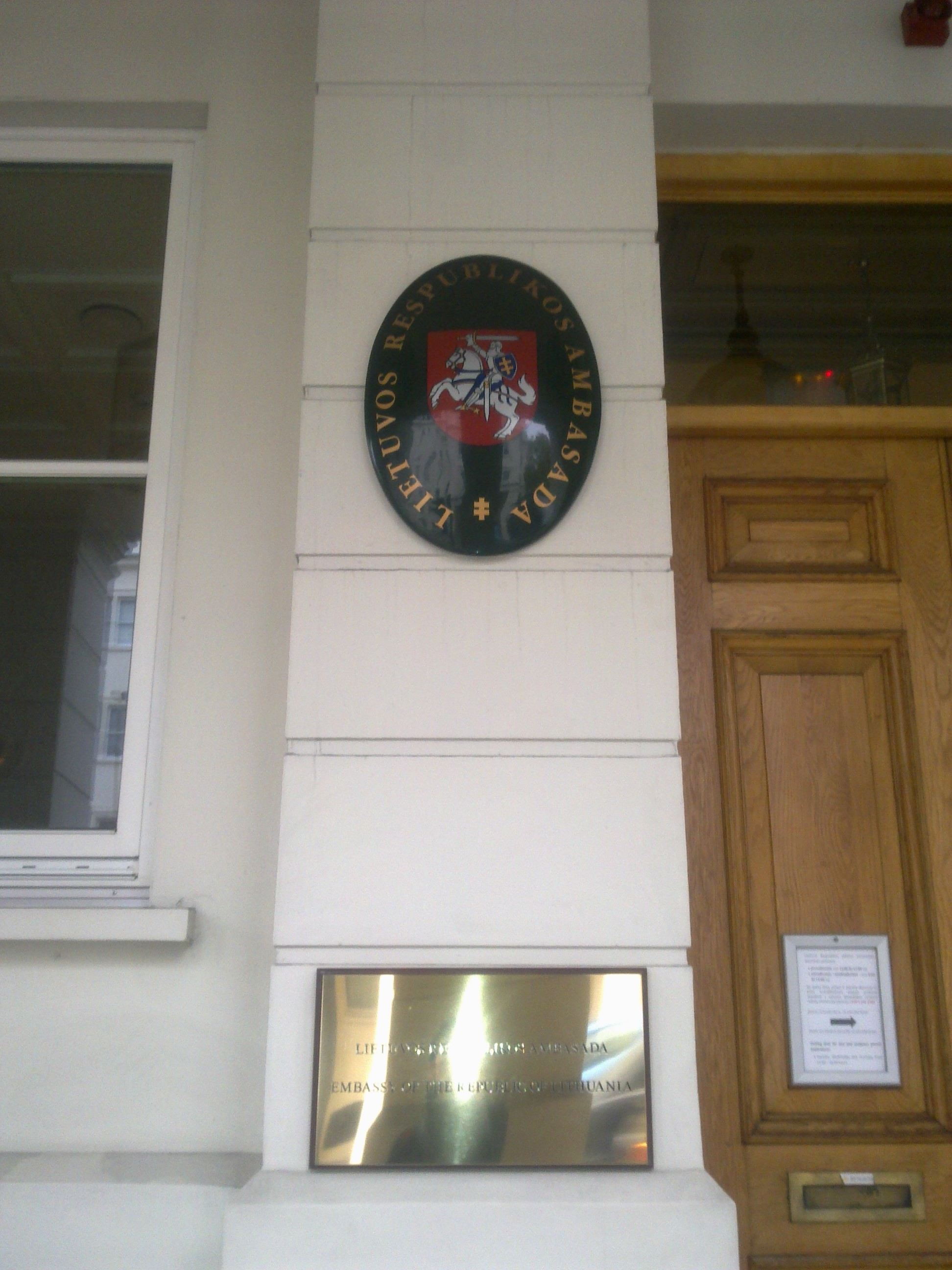
Plaques outside the embassy, one depicting the Coat of arms of Lithuania
