= List of museums in Kent =

This list of museums in Kent, England contains museums which are defined for this context as institutions (including nonprofit organizations, government entities, and private businesses) that collect and care for objects of cultural, artistic, scientific, or historical interest and make their collections or related exhibits available for public viewing. Also included are non-profit art galleries and university art galleries. Museums that exist only in cyberspace (i.e., virtual museums) are not included.

== Museums ==
Name	Image	Town/city	Region	Type	Summary
Agricultural Museum, Brook		Brook	Ashford	Agriculture	barn and oast house with farm tools, equipment, wagons, operated by the Wye Rural Museum Trust
Ashford Museum		Ashford	Ashford	Local	local history, archaeology, geology, industry, household artifacts
Beaney House of Art and Knowledge		Canterbury	City of Canterbury	Multiple	Known locally as the Beaney Institute or The Beaney, formerly known as the Royal Museum and Art Gallery, includes art, photography, local history
Belmont House and Gardens		Throwley	Swale	Historic house	18th-century Georgian house and gardens, features extensive private collection of clocks
Blue Town Heritage Centre		Blue Town	Swale	Local	local history, culture, music hall and cinema
Brattle Farm Museum		Staplehurst	Maidstone	Agriculture	information, open for groups by appointment only, historic farm equipment, household items, vintage cars
Bredgar and Wormshill Light Railway		Bredgar	Swale	Railway	Heritage railroad and museum with steam locomotives, freight and carriage stock, railway artefacts
British Cartoon Archive		Canterbury	City of Canterbury	Art	Exhibit gallery of political and social-comment cartoons from British newspapers and magazines, part of the University of Kent
Canterbury Heritage Museum		Canterbury	City of Canterbury	Multiple	City history, culture, Rupert the Bear Museum for children
Canterbury Roman Museum		Canterbury	City of Canterbury	Archaeology	Artifacts from Roman Britain and reconstructions
Chantry Heritage Centre		Gravesend	Gravesham	Local	local history, located in a 14th-century chantry
Chart Gunpowder Mills		Faversham	Swale	Industry	18th-century gunpowder factory with watermill, one of the sites of the Faversham explosives industry
Chartwell		Westerham	Sevenoaks	Historic house	Operated by the National Trust, principal adult home of Sir Winston Churchill, exhibits, paintings and memorabilia, gardens
Chatham Historic Dockyard		Chatham	Medway	Maritime	Includes 3 historic warships: HMS Gannet (1878), HMS Cavalier (R73) and HMS Ocelot (S17), a Victorian rope factory, a recreation of the working life of the dockyard in 1758, the Museum of the Royal Dockyard, a museum about the work of the Royal National Lifeboat Institution
Chiddingstone Castle		Chiddingstone	Sevenoaks	Multiple	Medieval style castle, includes Egyptian and Buddhist artefacts, Japanese armour and swords, Jacobean paintings, gardens
Chillenden Windmill		Chillenden	Dover	Mill	Reconstructed mid-19th-century windmill
C M Booth Motor Museum		Rolvenden	Ashford	Transportation	collection of Morgan Motor Company three wheel cars, bicycles, tricycles, model cars, automotive memorabilia
Colonel Stephens Railway Museum		Tenterden	Ashford	Railway	History of Colonel H. F. Stephens, manager of the Kent and East Sussex Railway, railway equipment and memorabilia
Court Hall Museum		Milton Regis	Swale	Local	currently closed, local history, archaeology
Crabble Corn Mill		River	Dover	Mill	Georgian and Victorian watermill
Crab Museum		Margate	Thanet		
Crampton Tower Museum		Broadstairs	Thanet	Multiple	life and works of railway engineer Thomas Russell Crampton, local railways, electric tramways, road transport, industry, model railways, local history
Cranbrook Museum		Cranbrook	Tunbridge Wells	Local	local history, culture, rural life artifacts, toys, costumes, household items, art
Dartford Borough Museum		Dartford	Dartford	Local	local history, culture, archaeology, geology, artifacts of Roman Britain, Anglo-Saxon, Norman and medieval eras
Deal Castle		Deal	Dover	Military	Operated by English Heritage, one of Henry VIII's Device Forts
Deal Maritime & Local History Museum		Deal	Dover	Multiple	local history, maritime heritage
Deal Timeball Tower Museum		Deal	Dover	Maritime	Semaphore tower used for navigation aid, exhibits about smuggling, signaling, and the mechanics of the time ball
Dickens House Museum		Broadstairs	Thanet	Biographical	information, Charles Dickens memorabilia and Victoriana
Dover Castle		Dover	Dover	Multiple	Operated by English Heritage, medieval castle with exhibits about its history, Henry II of England living history tower rooms, secret World War II tunnels
Dover Museum		Dover	Dover	Multiple	Local history, culture, archaeology, houses the Dover Bronze Age Boat
Dover Transport Museum		Dover	Dover	Transportation	. cars, bicycles, buses, road vehicles, model railway and tramway, local transport history, model vehicles, maritime display, 1930s garage and period shops, farm vehicles
Draper's Windmill		Margate	Thanet	Mill	Mid-19th-century windmill
Dungeness Lighthouse		Dungeness	Shepway	Maritime	Lighthouse museum, adjacent to Dungeness railway station
Dymchurch Martello Tower		Dymchurch	Shepway	Military	Operated by English Heritage, early 19th-century artillery tower
East Kent Light Railway		Shepherdswell	Dover	Railway	Heritage railway and signal box visitor centre with railroad artifacts, model railway
Eastgate House		Rochester	Medway	Multiple	16th-century Elizabethan town house featured as the Nun's House in Charles Dickens’ novel The Pickwick Papers, Dickens' exhibits, changing exhibits of art and local history
Eden Valley Museum		Edenbridge	Sevenoaks	Local	Local history, medieval period room, blacksmith and tanning trades, cricket ball making
Elham Valley Line Trust Countryside Centre & Railway Museum		Peene	Shepway	Railway	history of the Elham Valley Railway, railway artifacts, local history, railway model of the Channel Tunnel
Finchcocks		Goudhurst	Tunbridge Wells	Music	Early Georgian manor house with collection of historical keyboard instruments
Fleur de Lis Heritage Centre		Faversham	Swale	Multiple	local history, explosives industry, history of Faversham Abbey and Davington Priory, Victorian period schoolroom and kitchen, period store displays, culture, gallery for changing art, history and culture exhibits
Fort Amherst		Chatham	Medway	Military	18th-century fort under restoration, includes World War II exhibit, period re-enactments
Godinton House		Ashford	Ashford	Historic house	Jacobean house with medieval hall, gardens
Gravesend's Cold War Bunker		Gravesend	Gravesham	Military	1950s Cold War underground nuclear bunker and command center
Guildhall Museum, Rochester	GuildhallRochester	Rochester, Kent	Medway	Local	Local history, culture, Victorian period drawing room and kitchen, fine art, exhibits on Charles Dickens, and agricultural engine and steam roller manufacturer Aveling and Porter
Herne Windmill		Herne	City of Canterbury	Mill	Late-18th-century windmill
Herne Bay Museum and Gallery		Herne Bay	City of Canterbury	Local	Local history, culture, archaeology, geology, paleontology, art
Hever Castle		Hever	Sevenoaks	Historic house	Medieval country house, childhood home of Anne Boleyn, exhibits from differing historical eras, instruments of torture, Tudor furnishings and history
Hop Farm Country Park		Beltring	Tonbridge and Malling	Multiple	Includes Yesterday's Village, a recreation of a bygone village with shops and artefacts on display, a wax museum, Hop Farm Museum with oast houses and exhibits about growing hops
Hythe Library and Museum		Hythe		Local	information, information, library with local history museum
Ightham Mote		Ightham	Tonbridge and Malling	Historic house	Operated by the National Trust, medieval moated manor house, gardens
Kent & Sharpshooters Yeomanry Museum		Hever	Sevenoaks	Military	located at Hever Castle, history and memorabilia of the Kent and Sharpshooters Yeomanry
Kent Battle of Britain Museum		Hawkinge	Shepway	Military	History of RAF Hawkinge and the Battle of Britain, World War II aircraft
Kent Life		Sandling	Maidstone	Open air	Formerly the Museum of Kent Life, 28-acre (110,000 m^{2}) heritage farm, historic houses, farm and village buildings
Kent Museum of Freemasonry		Canterbury	City of Canterbury	Masonic	Masonic history, paintings, glassware, porcelain, regalia
Kent Police Museum		Chatham	Medway	Law enforcement	History of the Kent County Constabulary
Killick's Mill		Meopham	Gravesham	Mill	Early-19th-century windmill
Knole House		Sevenoaks	Sevenoaks	Historic house	Operated by the National Trust, 17th-century country house, birthplace and childhood home of Vita Sackville-West, includes rare furniture, important paintings, gardens
Lashenden Air Warfare Museum		Headcorn	Maidstone	Aviation	Located at Lashenden (Headcorn) Airfield, military aircraft and aviation history
Leeds Castle		Leeds	Maidstone	Historic house	Former royal palace dating to the 12th century, furnished rooms, moat, aviary, maze, grotto, gardens, dog collar museum, other attractions
Lullingstone Castle		Lullingstone	Sevenoaks	Historic house	Medieval manor house and gardens
Lullingstone Roman Villa		Eynsford	Sevenoaks	Archaeology	Operated by English Heritage, excavated Roman villa artifacts
Lydd Town Museum		Lydd	Shepway	Local	information, local history
Maidstone Museum & Art Gallery		Maidstone	Maidstone	Multiple	Local history, natural history, geology, archaeology, ethnography, fine and decorative art, Ancient Egyptian artifacts, costumes, Japanese decorative arts and prints, Queen's Own Royal West Kent Regiment Museum
Maison Dieu		Faversham	Swale	Archaeology	Operated by English Heritage, 13th-century wayside hospital housing area Roman artifacts
Margate Museum		Margate	Thanet	Local	local history and culture, located in a former Victorian police station and magistrates court
Mascalls Gallery		Paddock Wood	Tunbridge Wells	Art	Includes national and international art exhibits
Minster Abbey Gatehouse Museum		Minster	Swale	Local	local history, culture
New Hall Museum		Dymchurch	Shepway	Local	information, local history
New Mill		Willesborough	Ashford	Mill	Mid-19th-century windmill, also houses the Norman Museum
Norman Museum		Willesborough	Ashford	Transportation	Mopeds, motorcycles and bicycles manufactured by Norman Cycles, located at New Mill
New Tavern Fort		Gravesend	Gravesham	Military	Remains of an 18th-century fort, guns from 1904, vaults, magazines, World War II displays
Old Brook Pumping Station		Chatham	Medway	Technology	1920s pumping station with two diesel engines, exhibits of local industrial equipment
Old Soar Manor		Borough Green	Tonbridge and Malling	Historic house	Operated by the English Heritage, small 13th-century stone manor house
Otford Heritage Centre		Otford	Sevenoaks	Local	information, local history
Owletts		Cobham	Gravesham	Historic house	Operated by the National Trust, Charles II house and garden, home of the architect Sir Herbert Baker
Penshurst Place		Penshurst	Sevenoaks	Historic house	Medieval mansion and gardens, state rooms, tapestries, arms and armour, toy museum
Powell-Cotton Museum		Birchington-on-Sea	Thanet	Multiple	Includes the 19th-century Regency-period Quex House, museum exhibits of wildlife dioramas, African cultural objects, firearms and cutting weapons, area archaeological artifacts, and porcelain from China and Europe collected by the family, Victorian gardens
Princess of Wales Royal Regiment Museum		Dover	Dover	Multiple	Located in Dover Castle, uniforms, weapons, regimental memorabilia
Quebec House		Westerham	Sevenoaks	Historic house	Operated by the National Trust, childhood home of General James Wolfe, exhibits about his life, the Battle of Quebec (1759), military memorabilia
Queen's Own Royal West Kent Regiment Museum		Maidstone	Maidstone	Military	Located inside the Maidstone Museum & Art Gallery
Queenborough Guildhall Museum		Queenborough	Swale	Local	local history, culture, industry, maritime heritage
RAF Manston History Museum		Manston	Thanet	Aviation	history of RAF Manston since 1916
Ramsgate Maritime Museum		Ramsgate	Thanet	Maritime	Maritime history of East Kent, development of the harbour, navigation, fishing, lifeboats and shipwrecks
Restoration House		Rochester, Kent	Medway	Historic house	Elizabethan mansion and garden where King Charles II stayed in 1660 on his way to reclaim England's throne
Rochester Art Gallery and Craft Case		Rochester	Medway	Art	changing exhibits of fine art, craft and design
Roman Painted House		Dover	Dover	Archaeology	Excavated remains of a Roman mansio, artifacts
Romney, Hythe and Dymchurch Railway		New Romney	Shepway	Railway	Heritage railway headquarters at the New Romney railway station with engine sheds and model train museum
Romney Marsh Wartime Collection		Brenzett	Shepway	Military	history of RAF Brenzett, remains recovered from aircraft crash sites, World War II aircraft, military equipment and memorabilia
Royal Engineers Museum		Gillingham	Medway	Military	History of the Corps of Royal Engineers and British military engineering
Rupert Bear Museum		Canterbury	City of Canterbury	Children's literature	Rupert the Bear museum for children – part of the Museum of Canterbury
Salomons Museum		Southborough	Tunbridge Wells	Historic house	Country house of Sir David Salomons, the first Jewish Lord Mayor of London, and of his nephew, Sir David Lionel Salomons, a scientist and engineer
Sandwich Guildhall Museum		Sandwich	Dover	Local	local history
Sarre Windmill		Sarre	Thanet	Mill	Early 19th-century windmill
Scotney Castle		Lamberhurst	Tunbridge Wells	Historic house	Operated by the National Trust, 19th-century Elizabethan-style house and ruins of a medieval castle and moat, formal gardens
Sevenoaks Museum		Sevenoaks	Sevenoaks	Local	part of the Sevenoaks Kaleidoscope, local history, culture
Sheerness Heritage Centre		Sittingbourne	Swale	Local	information, local history, 19th-century-period rooms
Shoreham Aircraft Museum		Shoreham	Sevenoaks	Aviation	Military aviation in World War II, relics from crashed RAF and Luftwaffe aircraft
Sittingbourne and Kemsley Light Railway		Sittingbourne	Swale	Railway	2 ft 6in narrow gauge heritage railway that operates from Sittingbourne to the banks of The Swale.
Sittingbourne Heritage Museum		Sittingbourne	Swale	Local	local history, archaeology
Six Poor Travellers House		Rochester, Kent	Medway	Historic house	16th-century charity house with restored Elizabethan bedrooms, inspiration for Charles Dickens' short story, The Seven Poor Travellers
Smallhythe Place		Small Hythe	Ashford	Historic house	Operated by the National Trust, 16th-century half-timbered house, home of Victorian actress Ellen Terry, houses her theatrical costume collection, local shipbuilding heritage
South Foreland Lighthouse		Dover	Dover	Maritime	Operated by the National Trust, first lighthouse powered by electricity and the site of the first international radio transmission
Spitfire and Hurricane Memorial Museum		Manston	Thanet	Aviation	World War II military aviators and aircraft, aviation memorabilia
St Augustine's Abbey		Canterbury	City of Canterbury	Religious	Operated by English Heritage, remains and museum about the 7th-century Benedictine abbey
St Margaret's Museum		St Margaret's Bay	Dover	Local	Local history and the environment
Stelling Minnis Windmill and Museum		Stelling Minnis	Shepway	Mill	Mid-19th-century windmill, also known as Davison's Mill
Stocks Mill		Wittersham	Ashford	Mill	18th-century windmill
Stoneacre		Otham	Maidstone	Historic house	Operated by the National Trust, 15th-century half-timbered yeoman's house
Swanton Mill		Mersham	Ashford	Mill	information, information, weather boarded watermill in working order
Teapot Island		Yalding	Maidstone	Art	Collection of over 3500 ceramic teapots
Temple Manor		Strood	Medway	Historic house	13th-century house of the Knights Templar with 17th-century additions
Tenterden Museum		Tenterden	Ashford	Local	local history, maritime heritage, Victorian room, hops growing and harvesting, tapestry depicting town history, industry
Thanet Smuggler Experience		Ramsgate	Thanet	History	history of smuggling throughout Thanet
The Canterbury Tales		Canterbury	City of Canterbury	History	visites audio
Tonbridge Castle		Tonbridge	Tonbridge and Malling	History	Motte and bailey gatehouse with medieval period rooms and audio tours
Tunbridge Wells Museum & Art Gallery		Royal Tunbridge Wells	Tunbridge Wells	Multiple	local history, toys, costumes, Tunbridge ware, natural history, art
Turner Contemporary		Margate	Thanet	Art	Visual arts centre, exhibitions of contemporary and historical art, events and activities
Tyrwhitt-Drake Museum of Carriages		Maidstone	Maidstone	Transportation	Collection of horse-drawn vehicles and transport curiosities
Union Mill		Cranbrook	Tunbridge Wells	Mill	Early 19th-century windmill
Upnor Castle		Upnor	Medway	Military	Operated by English Heritage, Elizabethan artillery fort
Walmer Castle and Gardens		Walmer	Dover	Historic house	Operated by English Heritage, built by Henry VIII as an artillery fortress, later residence of the Lord Warden of the Cinque Ports, exhibits about the Duke of Wellington, gardens
Walpole Bay Hotel & Museum		Margate	Thanet	History	1914 hotel that includes displays of hotel antiques, history of the hotel, fossils and natural history artifacts, 19th- and 20th-century glass
Westenhanger Castle		Westenhanger	Shepway	Historic house	Medieval castle and barns under restorations, features a replica of the ship Discovery, one of the three ships that established the first permanent English speaking colony in America at Jamestown, Virginia
West Gate Towers		Canterbury	City of Canterbury	Military	Armaments from the English Civil War to World War II, original prison cells and murder holes
White Mill Rural Heritage Centre		Sandwich	Dover	Mill	Includes a mid-18th-century windmill, early 20th-century miller's cottage, farming and craft tools, a wheelwright's workshop, and a blacksmith's workshop
Whitstable Museum and Gallery		Whitstable	City of Canterbury	Local	Local history, maritime heritage of oysters, diving and shipping, natural history, art
Woodchurch Mill		Woodchurch	Ashford	Windmill	Early 19th-century windmill
Woodchurch Village Life Museum		Woodchurch	Ashford	Local	local history, rural life artifacts, culture, trades and professions

== Defunct museums ==
- Ashford Steam Centre, Willesborough, Kent, in operation 1968–76
- Charles Dickens Centre, Rochester, closed in 2004
- Dolphin Sailing Barge Museum, Sittingbourne, closed after a fire in 2009
- Farming World, Boughton under Blean, closed in 2014
- Kent Fire and Rescue Service Museum, Maidstone
- Manston Fire Museum, Manston, closed in 2014
- White Cliff Experience, Dover

== See also ==
- Category:Tourist attractions in Kent
