= List of tourist attractions in Kent =

A list of tourist attractions in the English county of Kent.

Key
	Abbey/Priory/Cathedral
Accessible open space	Accessible open space
	Amusement/Theme Park
	Castle
Country Park	Country Park
	English Heritage
	Forestry Commission
Heritage railway	Heritage railway
Historic house	Historic House
Places of Worship	Places of Worship
Museum (free) Museum	Museum (free/not free)
National Trust	National Trust
	Theatre
	Zoo

== Castles, houses and historical buildings ==
- Canterbury Cathedral
- Chartwell (principal adult home of Winston Churchill)
- Chiddingstone Castle
- Deal Castle
- Dover Castle
- The Grange, Ramsgate
- Hever Castle
- Ightham Mote 14th century house
- Knole House
- Leeds Castle
- Penshurst Place
- Fort Amherst, Chatham
- Reculver (Roman fort & Reculver Towers)
- Richborough Castle & Roman Fort
- Rochester Castle
- Rochester Cathedral
- St Augustine's Abbey
- Scotney Castle
- Sissinghurst Castle Garden
- Smallhythe Place
- Squerryes Court
- Tonbridge Castle
- Upnor Castle
- Walmer Castle

== Country parks, gardens and accessible open spaces ==
- Ashford Green Corridor
- Bedgebury National Pinetum
- Bewl Water
- Bough Beech Reservoir
- Brockhill Country Park
- Capstone Farm Country Park
- Emmetts Garden
- Great Comp Garden
- Hoo Peninsula
- Milton Creek Country Park
- North Downs Way a long distance footpath
- Pines Garden
- Stour Valley Walk
- Isle of Thanet
- The Hop Farm Country Park
- The Wantsum Channel
- White Cliffs of Dover

== Museums ==
- Ashford Borough Museum
- The Canterbury Tales, tourist attraction in Canterbury about the work by Geoffrey Chaucer
- Chatham Historic Dockyard
- Dolphin Yard Sailing Barge Museum
- Dover Museum
- Kent Battle of Britain Museum
- Kent International Airport (formerly known as London Manston Airport) with two aviation museums
- Kent Museum of Freemasonry
- Maidstone Museum & Bentlif Art Gallery
- Ramsgate Maritime Museum
- Royal Engineers Museum
- Thanet Smuggler Experience
- Willesborough Windmill

== Ancient monuments ==
- Coldrum Stones near Trottiscliffe
- Julliberrie's Grave near Chilham
- Kit's Coty House near Aylesford
- Lower Mill, Woodchurch
- Medway megaliths (various locations in the Medway valley)

== Railways ==
- Bredgar and Wormshill Light Railway
- East Kent Railway
- Kent & East Sussex Railway
- Romney, Hythe & Dymchurch Railway
- Sittingbourne & Kemsley Light Railway
- Spa Valley Railway

== Wildlife Parks, Zoos & Farm Attractions ==
- Howletts Wild Animal Park
- Wildwood Trust (previously Wildwood Discovery Park)
- Port Lympne Zoo
- Rare Species Conservation Centre
- Wingham Wildlife Park (previously Wingham Bird Park)

== Others ==
- Bluewater Shopping Centre
- Chatham Dockyard
- Cinque Ports
- Dickens World
- Diggerland
- Dreamland Margate
- Ebbsfleet United F.C.
- Gillingham Football Club
- Margate Football Club
- Romney Marsh
- St. Lawrence Cricket Ground, Canterbury
- Shell Grotto, Margate
- Turner Contemporary
