= Pumping station =

Facilities including pumps and equipment for pumping fluids from one place to another

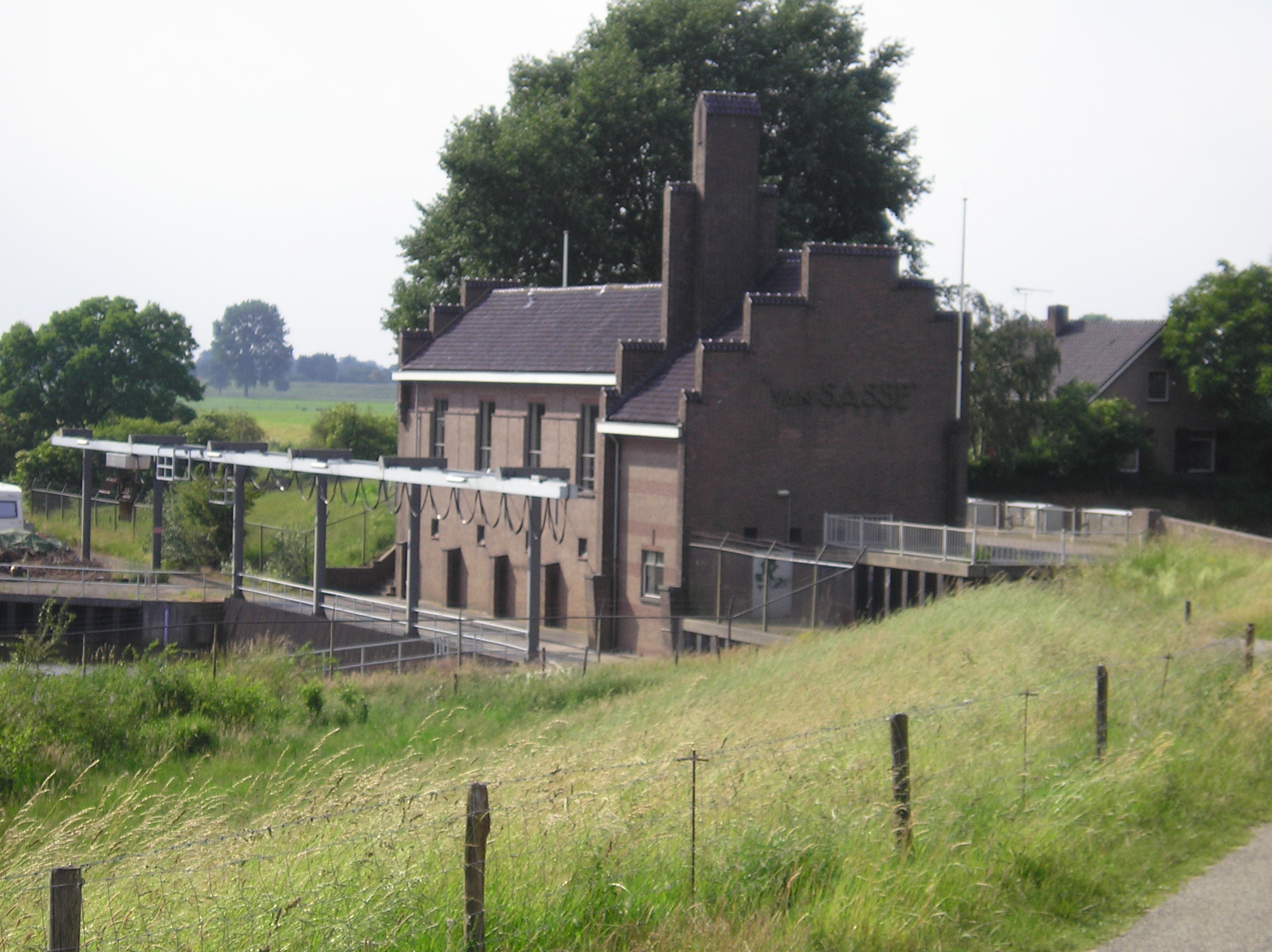
Pumping station Van Sasse in Grave, Netherlands

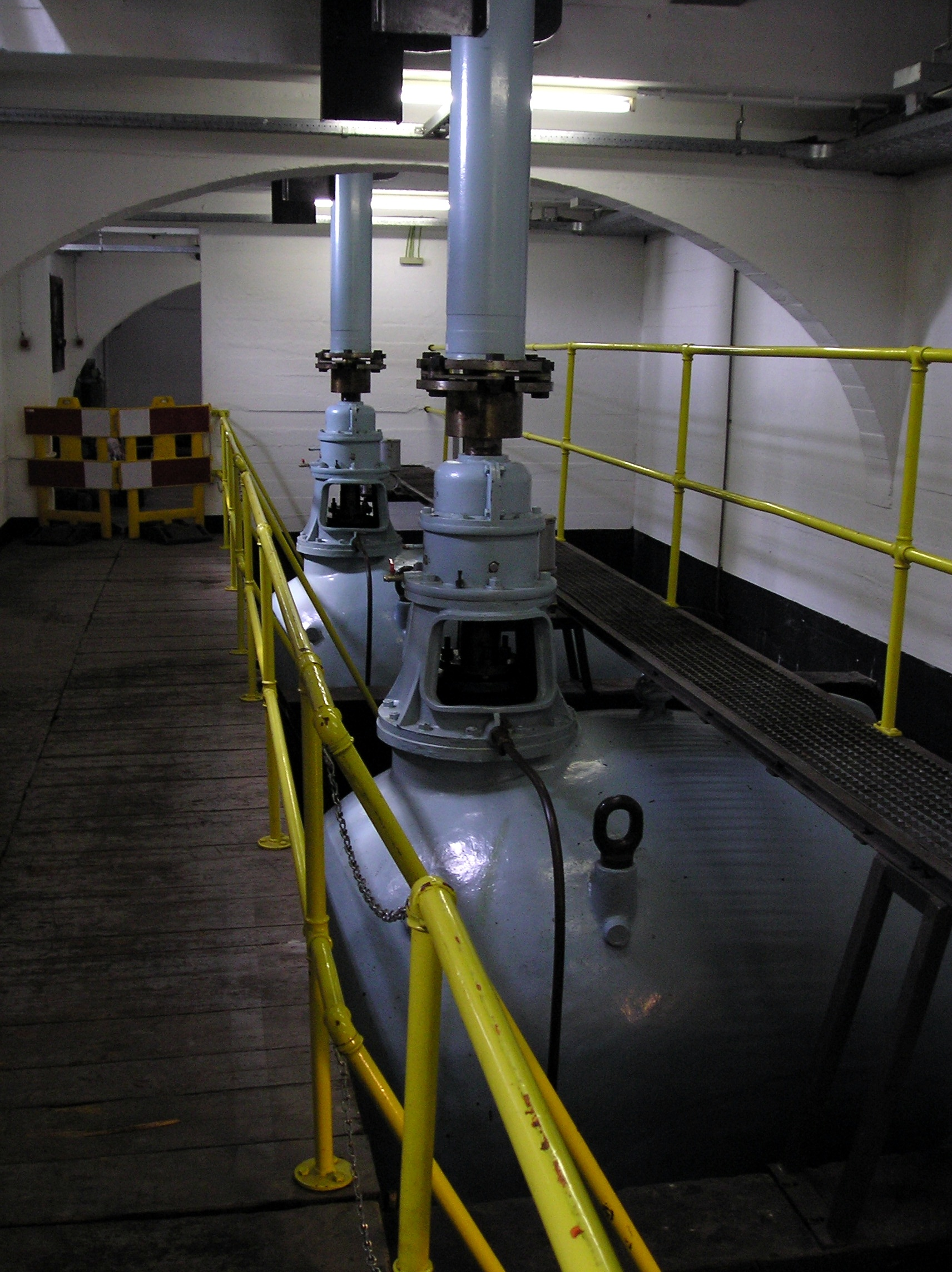
Pumping station Van Sasse in Grave, the Netherlands

Pumping stations, also called pumphouses, (Note: In situations such as drilled wells and drinking water) are public utility buildings containing pumps and equipment for pumping fluids from one place to another. They are critical in a variety of infrastructure systems, such as water supply, drainage of low-lying land, canals and removal of sewage to processing sites. A pumping station is an integral part of a pumped-storage hydroelectricity installation.

Pumping stations are designed to move water or sewage from one location to another, overcoming gravitational challenges, and are essential for maintaining navigable canal levels, supplying water, and managing sewage and floodwaters. In canal systems, pumping stations help replenish water lost through lock usage and leakage, ensuring navigability. Similarly, in land drainage, stations pump water to prevent flooding in areas below sea level, a concept pioneered during the Victorian era in places like The Fens in the UK. The introduction of "package pumping stations" has modernized drainage systems, allowing a compact, efficient solution for areas where gravity drainage is impractical.

Water pumping stations are differentiated by their applications, such as sourcing from wells, raw water pumping, and high service pumping, each designed to meet specific demand projections and customer needs. Wastewater pumping stations, on the other hand, are engineered to handle sewage, with designs that ensure reliability and safety, minimizing environmental impacts from overflows. Innovations in pump technology and station design have led to the development of submersible pump stations, which are more compact and safer, effectively reducing the footprint and visibility of sewage management infrastructure. Electronic controllers have enhanced the efficiency and monitoring capabilities of pumping stations, essential for modern systems. Pumped-storage schemes represent a critical use of pumping stations, providing a method for energy storage and generation by moving water between reservoirs at different elevations, highlighting the versatility and importance of pumping stations across sectors.

Some pumping stations have been recognized for their architectural and historical significance, e.g. the Claverton and Crofton Pumping Stations, and are preserved as museum attractions. Examples such as land drainage in the Netherlands, water supply in Hong Kong and agricultural drainage in Iraq underscore the vital role these facilities play in supporting modern infrastructure, environmental management, and energy storage.

== Canal water supply ==
In countries with canal systems, pumping stations are also frequent. Because of the way the system of canal locks work, water is lost from the upper part of a canal each time a vessel passes through. Also, most lock gates are not watertight, so some water leaks from the higher levels of the canal to those lower down. The water has to be replaced or eventually the upper levels of the canal would not hold enough water to be navigable.

Canals are usually fed by diverting water from streams and rivers into the upper parts of the canal, but if no suitable source is available, a pumping station can be used to maintain the water level. An example of a canal pumping station is the Claverton Pumping Station on the Kennet and Avon Canal in southern England, United Kingdom. This pumps water from the nearby River Avon to the canal using pumps driven by a waterwheel which is powered by the river.

Where no external water supply is available, back pumping systems may be employed. Water is extracted from the canal below the lowest lock of a flight and is pumped back to the top of the flight, ready for the next boat to pass through. Such installations are usually small.

== Land drainage ==
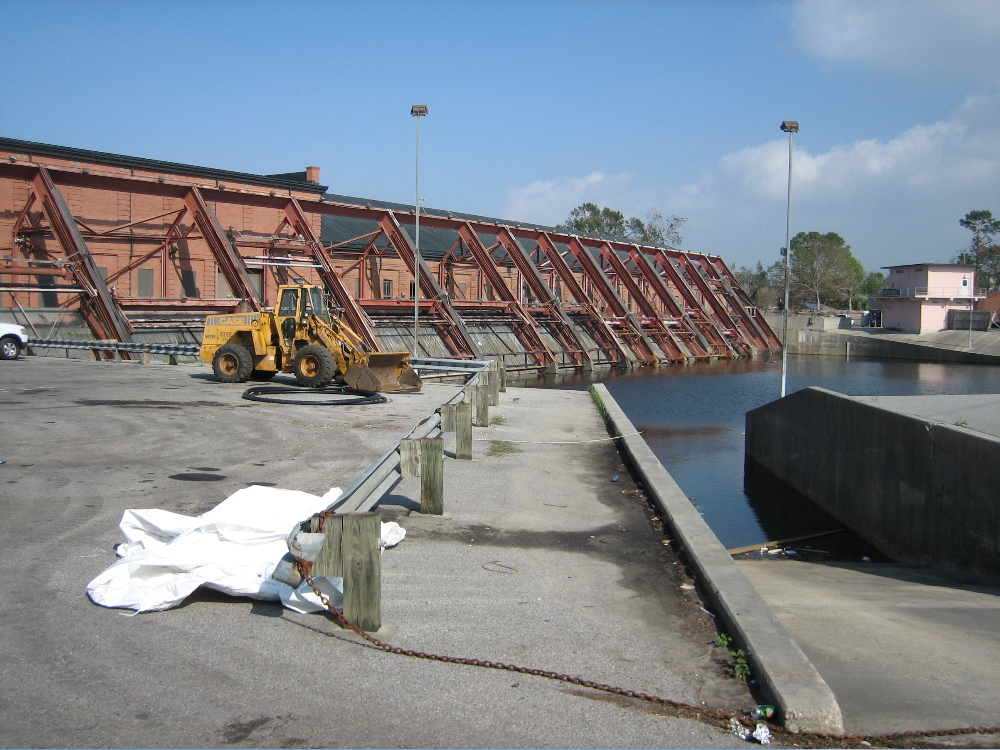
New Orleans, Louisiana: Metairie Pumping Station, also known as Pumping Station 6, was constructed in 1899, near Metairie Road and the head of the 17th Street Canal.

When low-lying areas of land are drained, the general method is to dig drainage ditches. However, if the area is below sea level then it is necessary to pump the water upwards into water channels that finally drain into the sea.

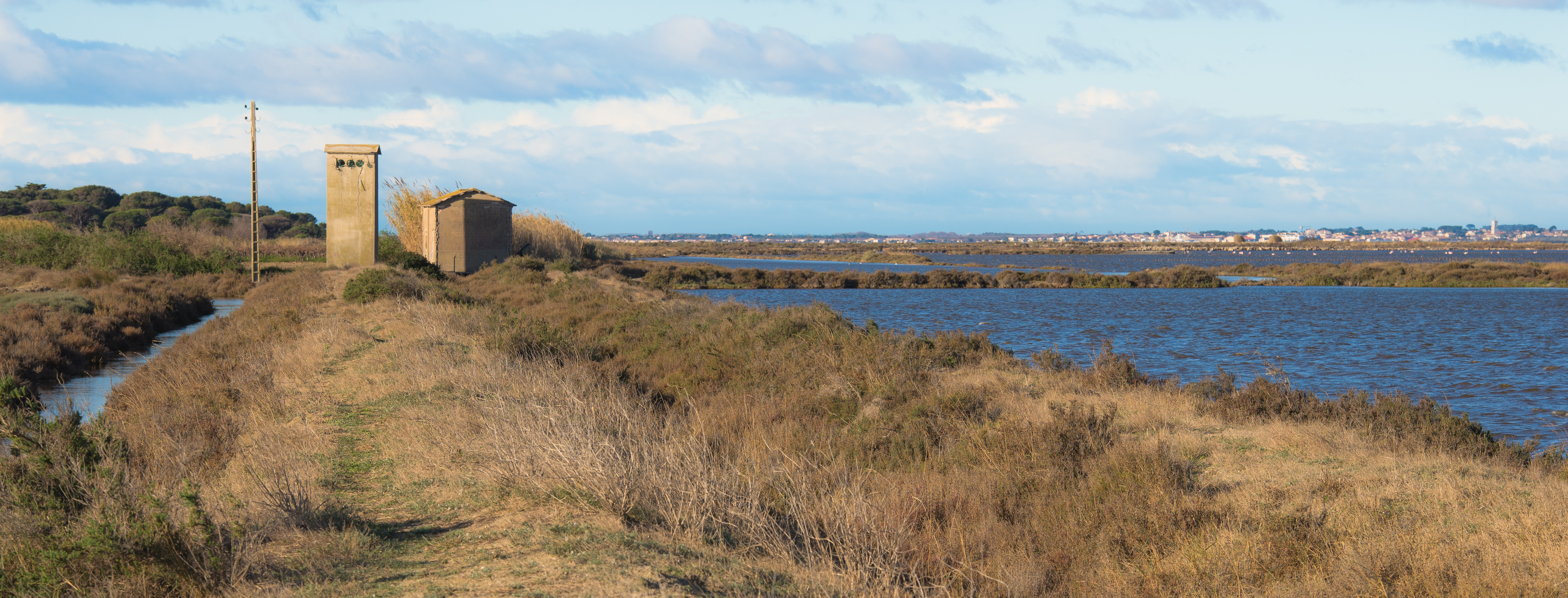
A land drainage pumping station in Sète, France

Elsewhere, pumping stations are used to remove water that has found its way into low-lying areas as a result of leakage or flooding (in New Orleans, for example).

=== Package pumping station ===
In more recent times, a "package pumping station" provides an efficient and economic way of installing a drainage system. They are suitable for mechanical building services collection and pumping of liquids like surface water, wastewater or sewage from areas where drainage by gravity is not possible.

A package pumping station is an integrated system, built in a housing manufactured from strong, impact-resistant materials such as precast concrete, polyethylene, or glass-reinforced plastic. The unit is supplied with internal pipework fitted, pre-assembled ready for installation into the ground, after which the submersible pumps and control equipment are fitted. Features may include controls for fully automatic operation; a high-level alarm indication, in the event of pump failure; and possibly a guide-rail/auto-coupling/pedestal system, to permit easy removal of pumps for maintenance.

Traditional site constructed systems have the valve vault components installed in a separate structure. Having two structural components can lead to potentially serious site problems such as uneven settling between components which results in stress on, and failure of the pipes and connections between components. The development of a packaged pump station system combined all components into a single housing which not only eliminates uneven settling issues, but pre-plumbing and outfitting each unit prior to installation can reduce the cost and time involved with civil work and site labor.

== Water pumping stations ==
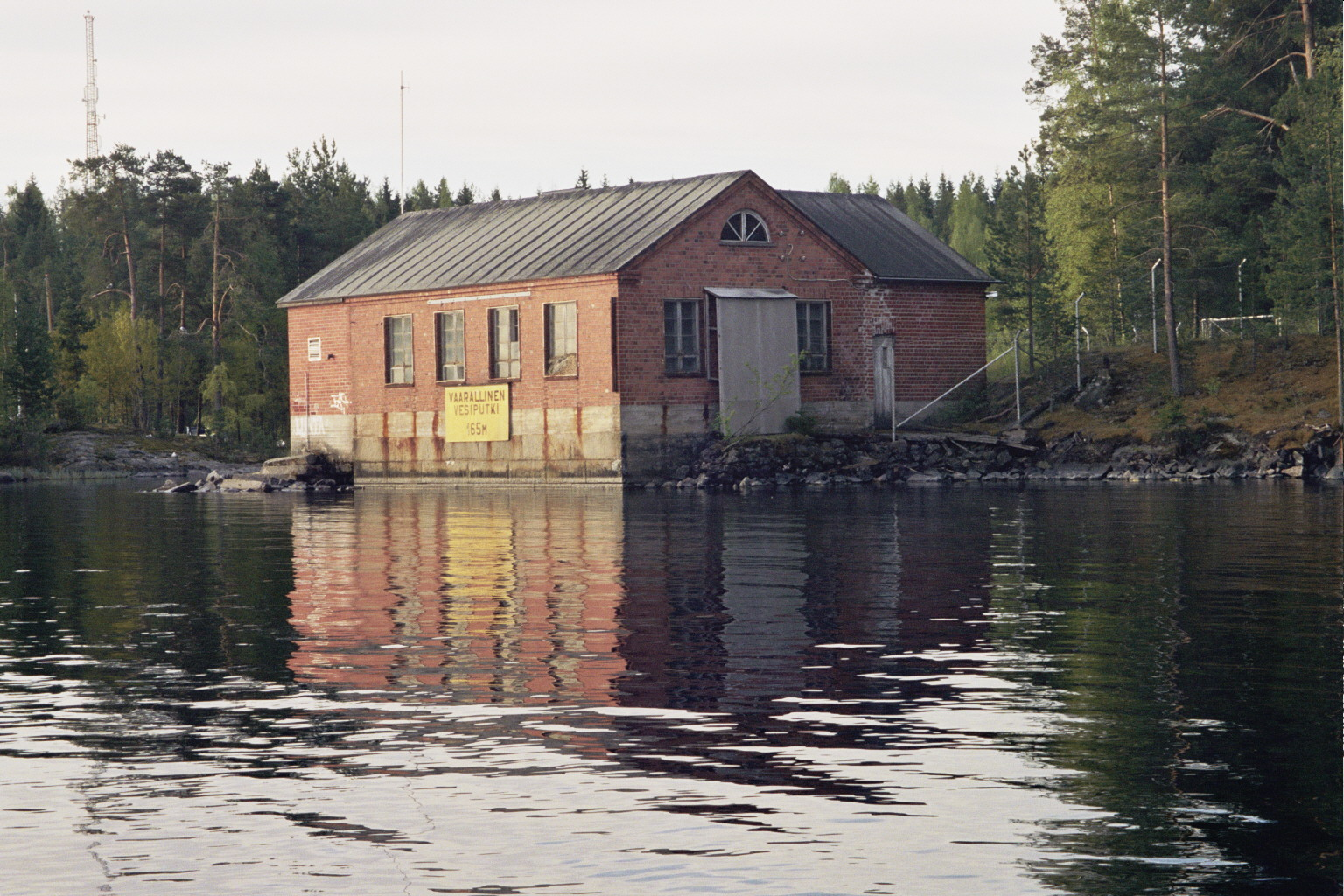
A red-brick pumping station on the shore of Lake Näsijärvi in Tampere, Finland

Water pumping stations are differentiated from wastewater pumping stations in that they do not have to be sized to account for high peak flow rates. They have five general categories:

- Source (such as a well) pump discharging into an elevated tank
- Raw water pumping from a river or lake
- In-line booster pumping into an elevated tank
- High service pumping of finished water at high pressure
- Distributed system booster without a storage tank in the piping system

Water pumping stations are constructed in areas in which the demand or projected demand is reasonably defined, and is dependent on a combination of customer needs and fire flow requirements. Average annual per-capita water consumption, peak hour, and maximum daily can vary greatly due to factors such as climate, income levels, population, and the proportions of residential, commercial, and industrial users.

== Wastewater pumping stations ==
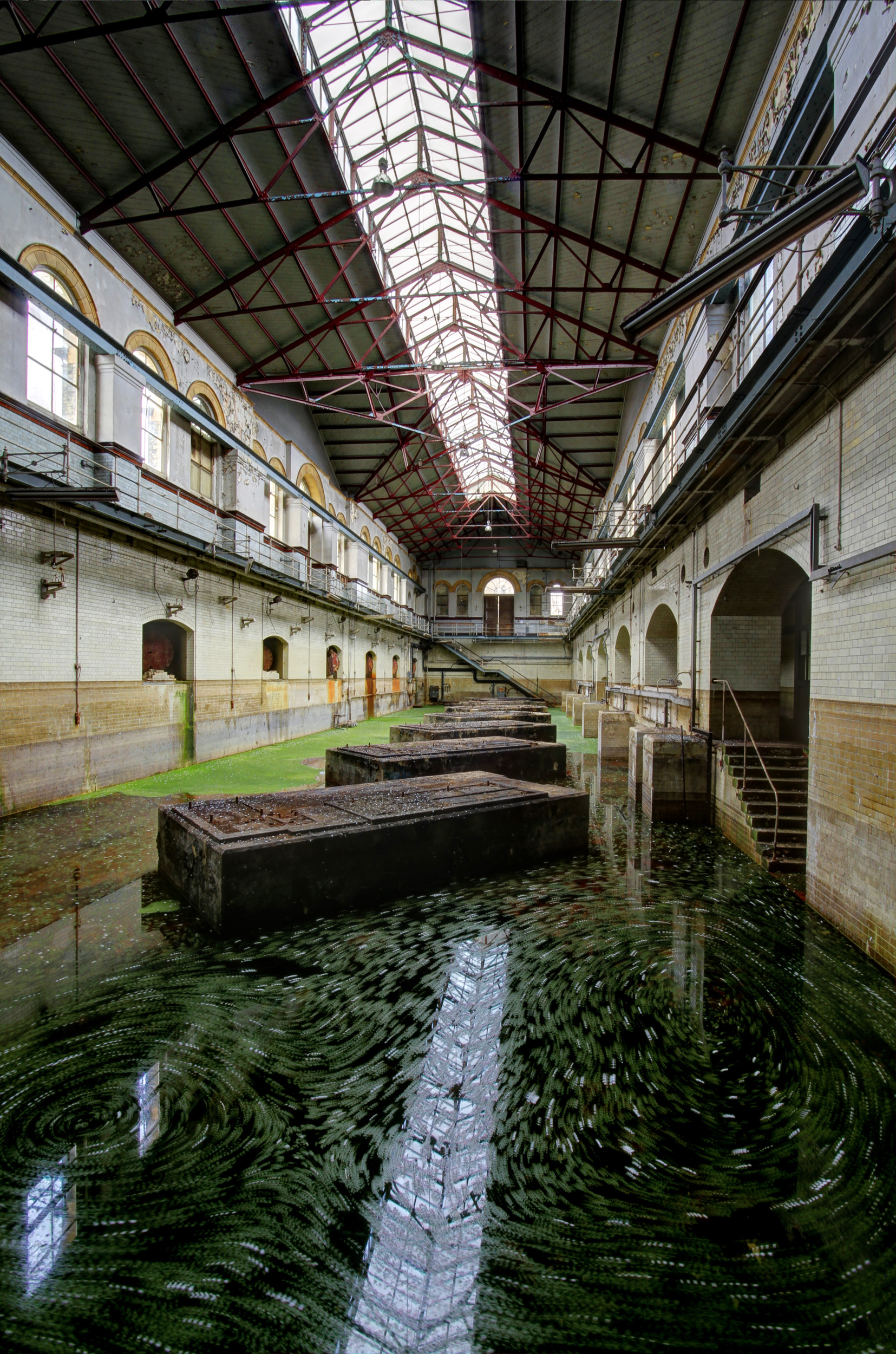
The now flooded C Station at Abbey Mills in London. The concrete platforms used to house large motor and pump assemblies that brought sewage up from a deep main drain into several outfall sewers, taking it away from the city centre.

Pumping stations in sewage collection systems are normally designed to handle raw sewage that is fed from underground gravity pipelines (pipes that are sloped so that a liquid can flow in one direction under gravity). Sewage is fed into and stored in a pit, commonly known as a wet well. The well is equipped with electrical instrumentation to detect the level of sewage present. When the sewage level rises to a predetermined point, a pump will be started to lift the sewage upward through a pressurized pipe system called a sewer force main if the sewage is transported some significant distance. The pumping station may be called a lift station if the pump merely discharges into a nearby gravity manhole. From here the cycle starts all over again until the sewage reaches its point of destination—usually a treatment plant. By this method, pumping stations are used to move waste to higher elevations. In the case of high sewage flows into the well (for example during peak flow periods and wet weather) additional pumps will be used. If this is insufficient, or in the case of failure of the pumping station, a backup in the sewer system can occur, leading to a sanitary sewer overflow—the discharge of raw sewage into the environment.

Sewage pumping stations are typically designed so that one pump or one set of pumps will handle normal peak flow conditions. Redundancy is built into the system so that in the event that any one pump is out of service, the remaining pump or pumps will handle the designed flow. The storage volume of the wet well between the "pump on" and "pump off" settings is designed to minimize pump starts and stops, but is not so long a retention time as to allow the sewage in the wet well to go septic.

Sewage pumps are almost always end-suction centrifugal pumps with open impellers and are specially designed with a large open passage so as to avoid clogging with debris or winding stringy debris onto the impeller. A four pole or six pole AC induction motor normally drives the pump. Rather than provide large open passages, some pumps, typically smaller sewage pumps, also macerate any solids within the sewage breaking them down into smaller parts which can more easily pass through the impeller.

The interior of a sewage pump station is a very dangerous place. Poisonous gases, such as methane and hydrogen sulfide, can accumulate in the wet well; an ill-equipped person entering the well would be overcome by fumes very quickly. Any entry into the wet well requires the correct confined space entry method for a hazardous environment. To minimize the need for entry, the facility is normally designed to allow pumps and other equipment to be removed from outside the wet well.

Traditional sewage pumping stations incorporate both a wet well and a "dry well". Often these are the same structure separated by an internal divide. In this configuration pumps are installed below ground level on the base of the dry well so that their inlets are below water level on pump start, priming the pump and also maximising the available NPSH. Although nominally isolated from the sewage in the wet well, dry wells are underground, confined spaces and require appropriate precautions for entry. Further, any failure or leakage of the pumps or pipework can discharge sewage directly into the dry well with complete flooding not an uncommon occurrence. As a result, the electric motors are normally mounted above the overflow, top water level of the wet well, usually above ground level, and drive the sewage pumps through an extended vertical shaft. To protect the above ground motors from weather, small pump houses are normally built, which also incorporate the electrical switchgear and control electronics. These are the visible parts of a traditional sewage pumping station although they are typically smaller than the underground wet and dry wells.

More modern pumping stations do not require a dry well or pump house and usually consist only of a wet well. In this configuration, submersible sewage pumps with closely coupled electric motor are mounted within the wet well itself, submerged within the sewage. Submersible pumps are mounted on two vertical guide rails and seal onto a permanently fixed "duckfoot", which forms both a mount and also a vertical bend for the discharge pipe. For maintenance or replacement, submersible pumps are raised by a chain off of the duckfoot and up the two guide rails to the maintenance (normally ground) level. Reinstalling the pumps simply reverses this process with the pump being remounted on the guide rails and lowered onto the duckfoot where the weight of the pump reseals it. As the motors are sealed and weather is not a concern, no above ground structures are required, excepting a small kiosk to contain the electrical switchgear and control systems.

Due to the much reduced health and safety concerns, and smaller footprint and visibility, submersible pump sewage pumping stations have almost completely superseded traditional sewage pumping stations. Further, a refit of a traditional pumping station usually involves converting it into a modern pumping station by installing submersibles in the wet well, demolishing the pump house and retiring the dry well by either stripping it, or knocking down the internal partition and merging it with the wet well.

== Electronic controllers ==
Pump manufacturers have always designed and manufactured electronic devices to control and supervise pumping stations. Today it is also very common to use a programmable logic controller (PLC) or Remote Terminal Unit (RTU) for such work, but the experience needed to solve certain particular problems, makes an easy choice to look for a specific pump controller. RTUs are very helpful in remote monitoring of each pumping station from a centralized control room with SCADA (Supervisory Control & Data Acquisition) systems. This setup can be helpful in monitoring pump faults, levels, and other alarms and parameters, making it more efficient.

== Pumped-storage schemes ==
A pumped-storage scheme is a type of power station for storing and producing electricity to supply high peak demands by moving water between reservoirs at different elevations.

Typically, water is channeled from a high-level reservoir to a low-level reservoir, through turbine generators that generate electricity. This is done when the station is required to generate power. During low-demand periods, such as overnight, the generators are reversed to become pumps that move the water back up to the top reservoir.

== List of pumping stations ==
There are countless thousands of pumping stations throughout the world. The following is a list of those described in this encyclopedia.

=== United Kingdom ===
In the UK (as well as many other countries), water pumping stations built between the 1830s and 1920s were treated as civic buildings, with ornate, formal architecture, reflecting their social importance during the urban sanitary crisis caused by industrialisation. Consequently, a considerable number of former pumping stations have been listed and preserved. Almost all were powered by large steam engines. Many sites with preserved in-situ engines have since re-opened as museum attractions.

==== Canal water supply ====
- Claverton Pumping Station, on the Kennet and Avon Canal, near Bath, water-powered
- Cobb's Engine House, ruin near southern portal of Netherton Tunnel
- Crofton Pumping Station, on the Kennet and Avon Canal, near Great Bedwyn
- Leawood Pump House, on the Cromford Canal in Derbyshire
- Smethwick Engine, now removed from original site to Birmingham Thinktank
- New Smethwick Pumping Station (now part of Galton Valley Canal Heritage Centre)

==== Groundwater supply ====
Used to pump water from a well into a reservoir

- Bestwood Pumping Station, Nottinghamshire
- Boughton Pumping Station, Nottinghamshire
- Bratch Pumping Station, Staffordshire
- Mill Meece Pumping Station, in Staffordshire
- Papplewick Pumping Station, Nottinghamshire (pumped from a 200 ft (61 m) deep well)
- Selly Oak Pumping Station, Birmingham (building converted to an electricity substation)
- Twyford Pumping Station, Hampshire

==== Hydraulic power station ====
- Wapping Hydraulic Power Station, London (converted to electricity, now an arts centre and restaurant)

==== Land drainage ====
- Pinchbeck Engine, near Spalding (preserved beam engine and scoop wheel)
- Pode Hole pumping station, near Spalding, Lincolnshire (formerly steam beam engines, no longer present)
- Prickwillow Engine House, near Ely, Cambridgeshire (now the Museum of Fenland Drainage)
- Stretham Old Engine, Stretham, Cambridgeshire
- Westonzoyland Pumping Station, Somerset

==== Public water supply ====
Used to pump drinking water from a reservoir into a water supply system.

- Blagdon Pumping Station, Chew Valley, Somerset
- Edgbaston Waterworks, Birmingham
- Kempton Park Pumping Station, London
- Kew Bridge Pumping Station, Kew Bridge, London
- Langford Pumping Station ("Museum of Power"), Essex
- Ryhope Engines Museum, Sunderland
- Tees Cottage Pumping Station, Darlington

==== Sewage ====
- Abbey Pumping Station, Leicester
- Abbey Mills Pumping Station, in North London. (steam engines no longer present)
- Cheddars Lane Pumping Station, Cambridge
- Claymills Pumping Station, near Burton upon Trent
- Coleham Pumping Station, Coleham, near Shrewsbury
- Crossness Pumping Station, in South London
- Dock Road Edwardian Pumping Station, in Northwich, Cheshire (Gas engines. Built 1913)
- Low Hall Pumping Station, Walthamstow, North London
- Markfield Beam Engine, Tottenham, London
- Old Brook Pumping Station, Chatham, Kent

==== Underground railway ====
- Brunel Engine House (now Brunel Museum), Rotherhithe, East London (extracted water from Thames Tunnel; engine no longer present)
- Shore Road Pumping Station, Birkenhead, Wirral (originally steam, now electric; extracts water from the rail tunnel under the River Mersey)

=== Hong Kong ===
==== Public water supply ====
- Engineer's Office of the Former Pumping Station, Hong Kong

=== Iraq ===
==== Agricultural drainage ====
- Nasiriyah Drainage Pump Station, Dhi Qar Province

=== Canada ===
- Hamilton Museum of Steam and Technology, Hamilton, Ontario's first Water Works, powered by two 1859 steam engines

=== Netherlands ===
==== Land drainage ====
- Cruquius pumping station (Operational, but no longer steam-powered.)
  – an 8-beam Cornish engine with the largest cylinder (144 in (3.5m) diameter) in the world.
- ir.D.F. Woudagemaal, (ir. Wouda pumping station) (world's largest steam-powered pumping station)

=== Spain ===
- Stations for public water supply in Barcelona. One of them is a Barcelona City History Museum heritage site (MUHBA Casa de l'aigua). Another is a museum itself: Museu Agbar de les Aigües (Agbar water museum).

=== United States ===
- Chicago Avenue Pumping Station in Chicago, built in 1869, still in use (with modern pumps) but also serves as a theater.
- Pumping Station No. 2 San Francisco Fire Department Auxiliary Water Supply System, San Francisco, California, listed on the National Register of Historic Places

== See also ==
- Edmonston Pumping Plant
- Gatehouse (waterworks) – some gatehouses incorporate pumping stations
- Submersible pump
- Water pumping
- Windpump

=== Waterworks railways ===
- Colne Valley Waterworks railway, Eastbury Pumping Station, near Watford
- Greater Winnipeg Water District Railway
- List of narrow gauge railways at water treatment and sewage works in Great Britain
- Metropolitan Water Board Railway, Kempton Park, London
