= Walthamstow Pumphouse Museum =

Museum in London, England

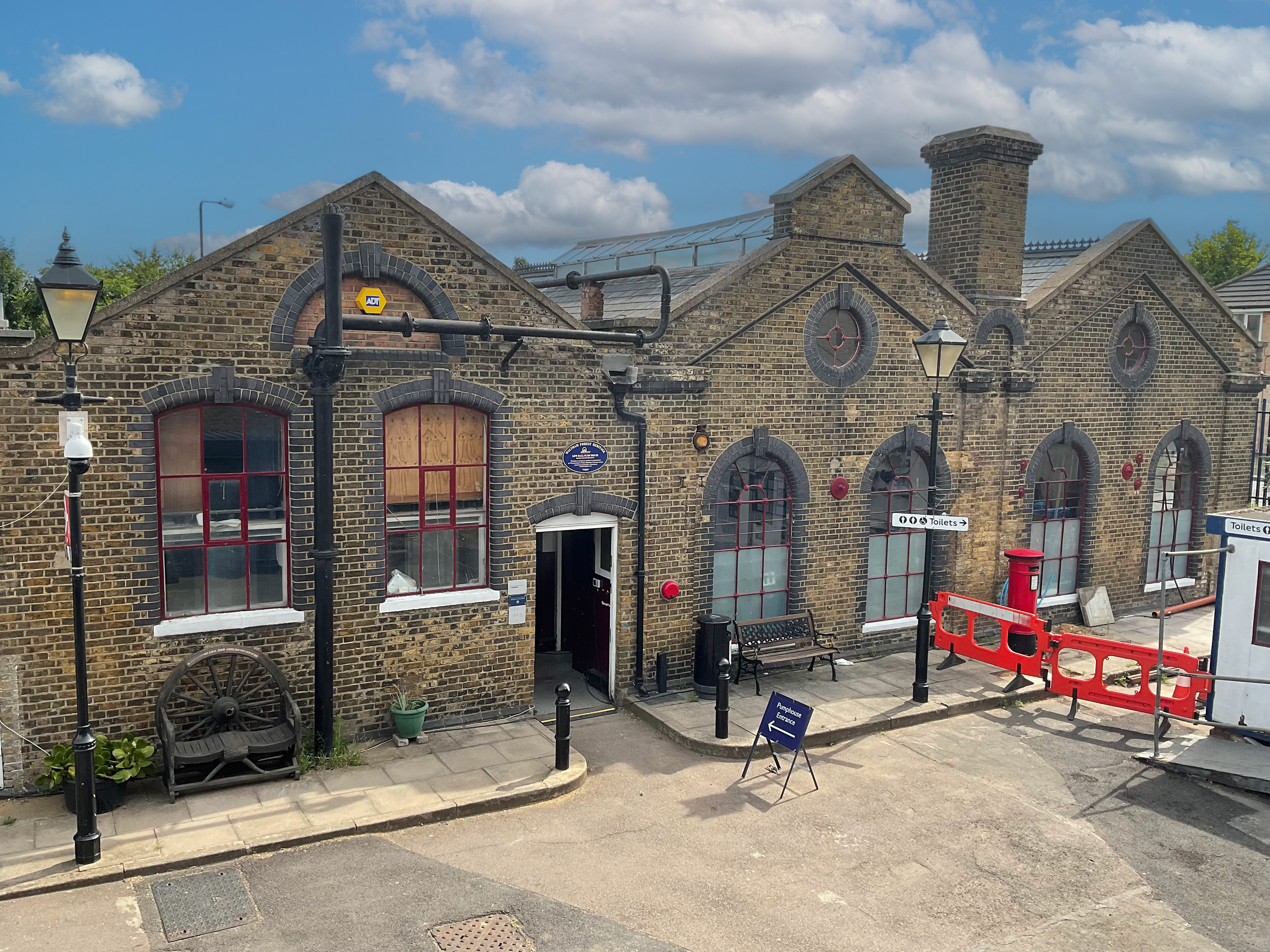
- Walthamstow Pumphouse Museum

- Location within London Borough of Waltham Forest
- Established: 1885
- Location: Walthamstow; London, E17; United Kingdom
- Coordinates: 51°34′36″N 0°02′04″W
- Type: Transport and local history
- CEO: Abdullah Seba
- Chairperson: Andrew Lewis
- Owner: Heritage and Communities Trust
- Public transit access: St James Street
- Website: walthamstowpumphouse.org.uk

The Walthamstow Pumphouse Museum is a museum based in Walthamstow, in the London Borough of Waltham Forest. It is based in and around Low Hall Pumping Station, a Grade II listed building, originally built as a sewage pumping station in 1885.

== Activity ==
The museum focuses on the pioneering breakthroughs in road, rail, air and sea transport, that occurred in Waltham Forest and the surrounding area,. These achievements include the first British motorcar and the first all British aircraft, which first flew from Walthamstow Marshes.

The museum displays various artifacts, including AEC Routemaster buses, a pair of Marshall C class steam engines, and various fire fighting vehicles.

Also included in the museum's collection is a decommissioned London Underground 1967 Stock Victoria line carriage that is frequently used as a film set, as a concert venue for Underground Lunchtime Recitals and as a supper club three nights per week. The museum also owns an additional 1967 Stock carriage that sustained damage that took it out of service prior to being refurbished, resulting in it retaining its original interior configuration and a 1967 Stock cab used for filming.

In 2025, the museum merged with the nearby Markfield Beam Engine and Museum to form the Heritage and Communities Trust.

== Gallery ==
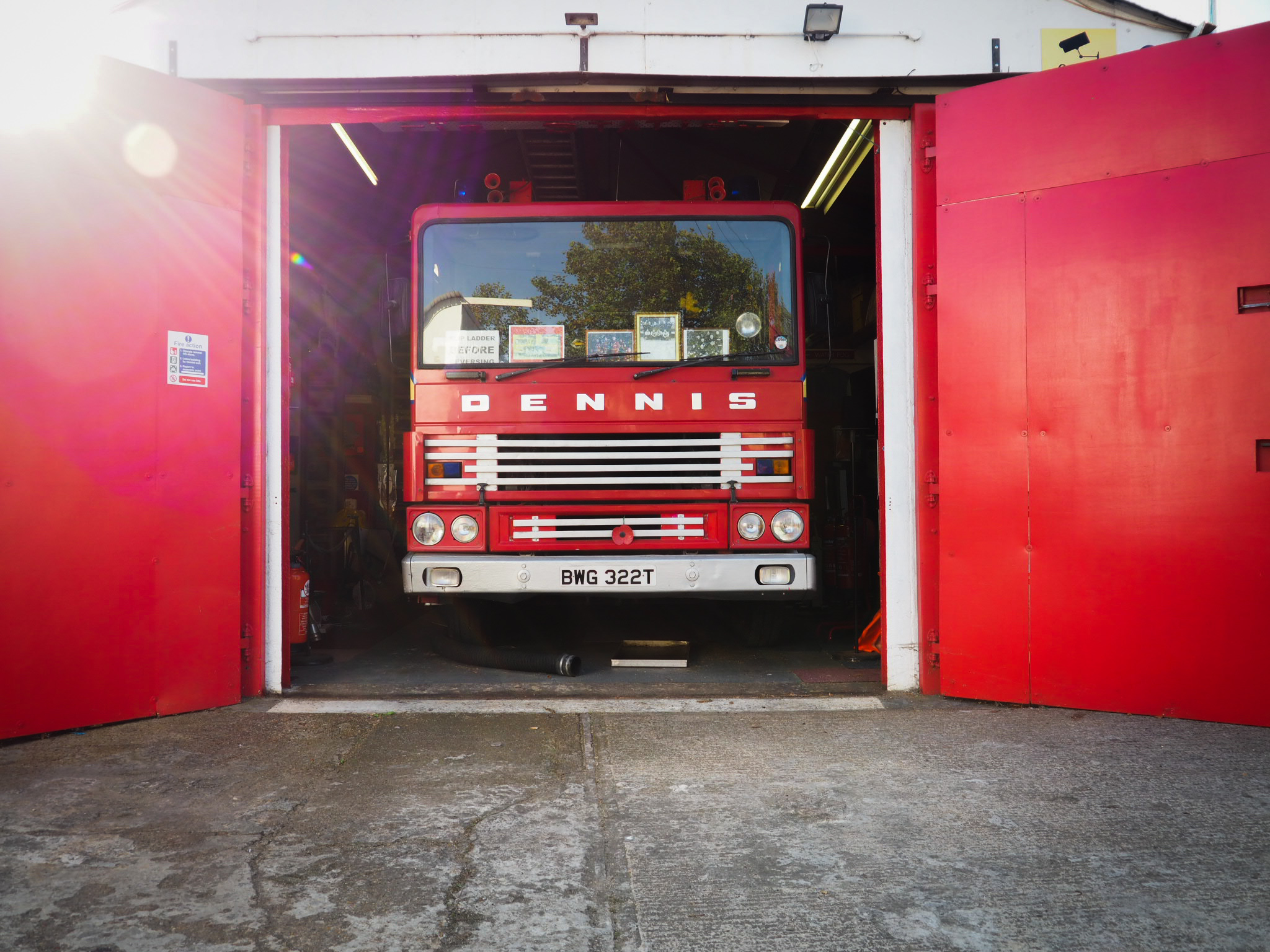
This Dennis fire engine has been featured in many films and TV series, including London's Burning, Casualty and The Bill.

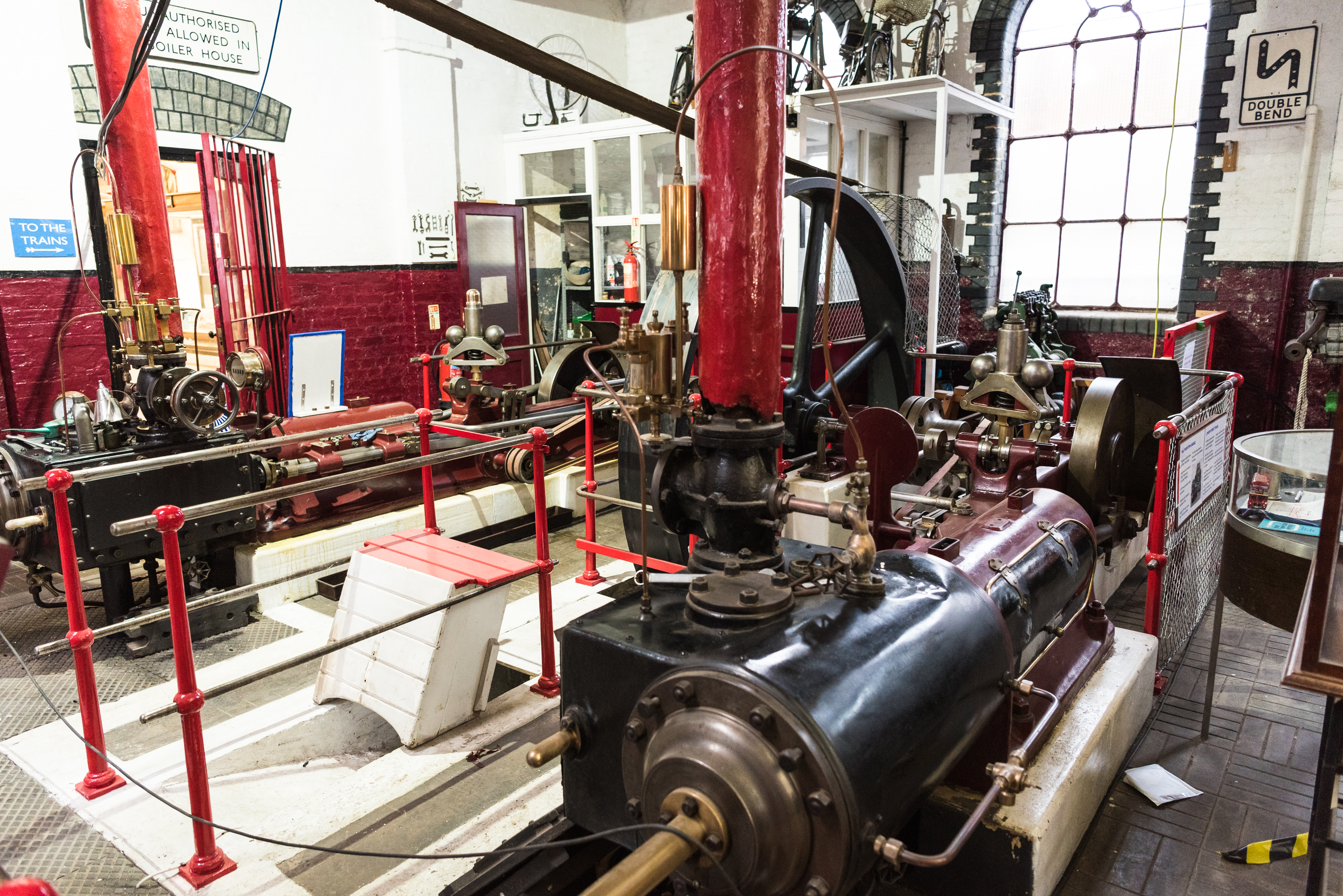
A working pair of original Marshall steam engines, which are Grade II listed

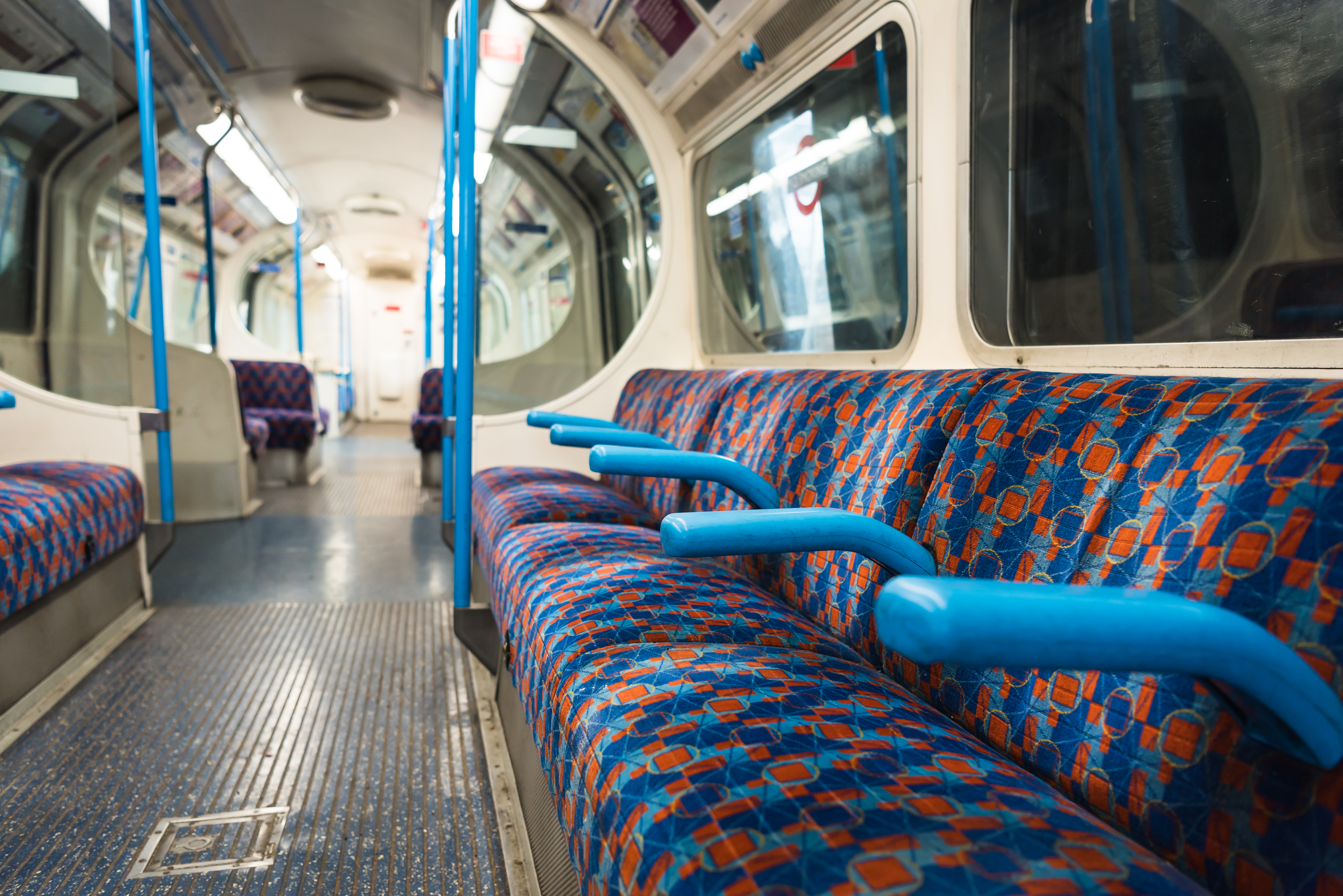
There are two 1967 tube stock Victoria line carriages in the collection as an example of transport innovation. The Victoria line was the first fully automatic underground railway in the world.
