= Heritage and Communities Trust =

Museum in London, England

- Location within Greater London
- Established: 2025
- Type: Trust
- Location(s): Walthamstow London, E17 United Kingdom
- Coordinates: 51°34′36″N 0°02′04″W
- Chief executive: Abdullah Seba

The Heritage and Communities Trust is a charitable trust based in Walthamstow, in the London Borough of Waltham Forest. It is the parent organisation of two museums; Markfield Beam Engine and Museum and Walthamstow Pumphouse Museum. Both museums were previously independent, but merged in 2025. The trust is based in Walthamstow.
