= Norman Engineering Co =

British industrial engine manufacturer

Norman Engineering Co Ltd
- Industry: Engineering
- Founded: 1919
- Defunct: 1968
- Successor: Auto Diesels Braby Group
- Headquarters: Leamington Spa, Warwick, Uxbridge, England
- Key people: Arthur Matthews
- Products: Engines, Pumps, Generators

The Norman Engineering Company (1919–1968) was a British manufacturer of lightweight air-cooled four-stroke industrial engines of 1 to 6 hp, based at premises in London, Leamington Spa, Warwick and Uxbridge. Other products included motorcycle engines, and aircraft/automobile parts.

== History ==
The Norman Engineering Company was founded in 1919 by J.A. Watts and E.J.H. Norman, with Arthur Matthews as its managing director. He would remain its managing director until his death in 1931. The company initially had premises in Upper Grove Street, Leamington Spa, and then in 1936 moved to Millers Road, Warwick. Although the company offered a range of engineering services, the main products for which the company is known are a range of lightweight four-stroke engines mainly used to drive pumps, battery chargers, compressors and lighting units.

The partnership between the founders, J.A. Watts and E.J.H Norman, was dissolved in 1923. The company continued as the Norman Engineering Company until it came under the control of Frederick Braby & Co around 1960 (who had acquired Auto Diesels in 1959), and then traded as Norman Industrial and Marine Engine Co, from the Auto Diesels Ltd., address at Cowley Mill Road, Uxbridge. Engines continued to be made using the Norman name until 1968 when the company was absorbed into the Auto Diesels Braby Group.

The Norman Engineering Co appears to have no connection with the Ashford, Kent based Norman Cycles, who made cycles and motorcycles, but did not produce their own engines.

== Engine models ==
,

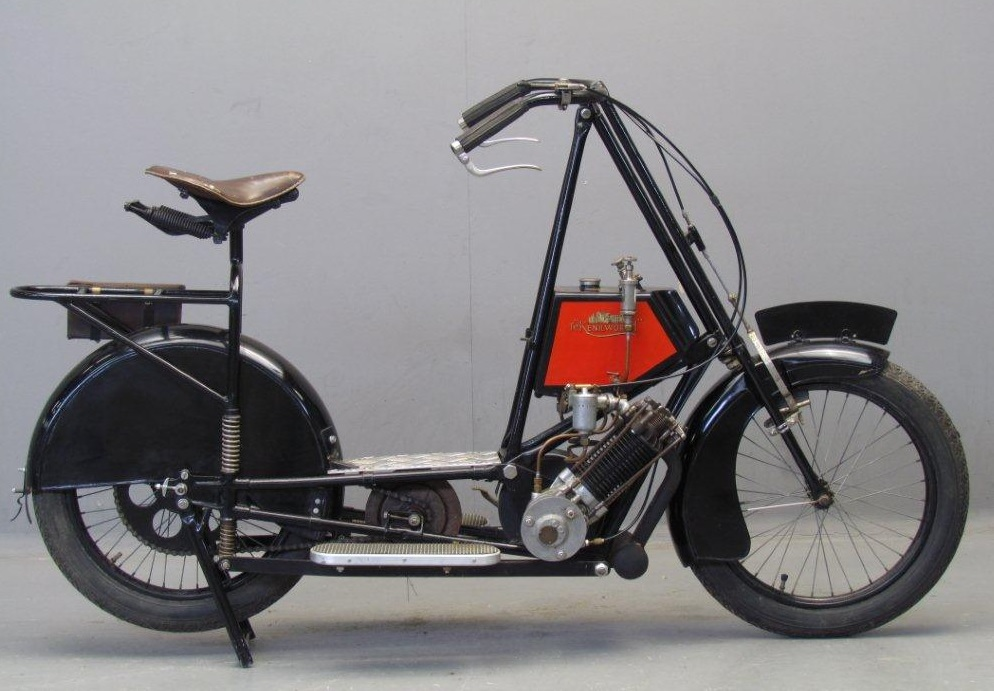
Kenilworth Scooter with Norman engine 1920

=== Scooter engine ===
This was the first commercial engine, made by Norman, and designed for the Kenilworth scooter which was produced at first by Booth Brothers of Coventry, and later by Kenilworth Utility Motors of Coventry. The engine, produced from 1919 to 1924, was a small 4-stroke air cooled unit of 143cc with overhead valves and rockers operated by external push rods. No governor was fitted as engine speed was controlled by a throttle lever. A Vici & Co of London carburettor was fitted, and the magneto ignition was by Runbaken of Manchester.

=== D Type ===
A development of the Scooter engine, the D type was used in Bungalyte lighting generator sets made for Arthur Lyon & Co, and in compressor sets for garages made for Dunlop. The engine was air cooled, and in the generator/compressor sets this was by a belt driven fan.

=== E, EC and ECR Type ===
A series of motorcycle engines to a new design, were produced from about 1924 to 1936. The base model E had a direct driven magneto, while the EC had a chain driven magneto which made it more compact. These flat head 170cc engines ran smoothly at up to 5000rpm, and for short periods up to 7500rpm. None of these engines were sold with carburettors so that motorcycle manufacturers could fit their preferred unit. If required, a CAV magneto was usually fitted, and oil pumps could also be supplied. The ECR type was a racing version of the EC, using a hemispherical cylinder head incorporating the spark plug and nickel-chrome valves. Notably a Norman ECR engine, fitted into an Elfson frame, was ridden by P.G. Dallison to a 170cc class victory at the 1925 BMCRC Championship meeting at Brooklands with an average speed of 67.74 mph.

=== MC Type ===
The MC motorcycle engine was a further development of the ECR engine, with an increased cylinder bore giving a capacity of 175cc, and a more deeply finned cylinder head to dissipate heat. Production ended in 1936.

=== S Type ===
This was a development of the E type motorcycle engine into a stationary power unit. Engine production started in 1926 and continued until December 1938. With a capacity of 169cc and rated at 1.75 hp at 1800rpm, this engine was intended as a replacement for the original D type engine. The engine retained the lever starting mechanism of the D type, and was fitted with a large brass Solex type MV carburettor and a front mounted direct driven BTH type M1 magneto. Cooling air was provided by vanes on the flywheel and directed around the cylinder with a cast aluminium cowling. Around 700 S type engines were made.

=== T250 ===
Originally developed in 1930 at the request of the Marconi Company for a lightweight engine to power a 1 kW generating set. Norman's built three prototype (flat) twin cylinder horizontally opposed engines of 250cc (hence type T250). Before the new engine went into production, Marconi requested an increase in power to drive a 1.5 kW generator and so the cylinder capacity was increased from 250cc to 300cc giving rise to the Norman T300 Mk1 engine in 1932. No T250 engines are known to survive, and it is thought they may have been converted to type T300 and sold as such.

=== T300 Mk1 ===
Initially a development of the T250 engine, the T300 Mk1, introduced in 1932 is a flat-twin air-cooled side-valve engine of 300cc. Production increased steadily during the late 1930s and by 1938 the engine was being used in generating sets bought by the Ministry of Defence (UK) and the Air Ministry. Large numbers were produced to Ministry contracts (handled by Arthur Lyon & Co) during WW2. Production of the T300 Mk1 had ceased by September 1945 with more than 10,000 engines of this type being produced.

The T300 Mk1 engine produces 2.75 hp when run at 1800rpm. Air flow to cool the engine is provided by a flywheel whose spokes are arranged as fan blades. The engine used a Solex 26FHG carburettor and a BTH (British Thomson-Houston) type MC2 magneto. For identification, the serial numbers for T300 Mk1 engines are preceded by the letters TE.

=== SC Type ===
The final Norman single cylinder engine design, this was produced from 1935 until 1958. It was the same power output as the type S and retained the overhead valve layout, but this was now provided with a removable dust cover. The main design change was to reposition the now chain driven magneto to the right hand side of the crankcase, to enable a starting handle (or rope start pulley) to be fitted to the front of the engine. At the same time the brass carburettor was replaced by an alloy unit (Solex type 26FV), and a Vokes air filter was introduced. The magneto used initially was a BTH type MC1, with a Wico Series A (impulse) magneto being used interchangeably on later engines. About 8,100 type SC engines were produced, with most used in generating or compressor sets, although some were used as marine engines. One generating set with a specially modified type SC engine was used to charge radio batteries on the 1936 Mount Everest Expedition, an opportunity used in Norman's own advertising literature. For identification, the serial numbers for SC engines are preceded by the letters SCL or SC.

=== T300 Mk2 ===
With the reduction in Ministry contracts at the end of WW2, the T300 Mk1 engine was revised slightly to improve its flexibility for a civilian market. Thus, the T300 Mk2 version was introduced in September 1945. Significant changes were made to the crankcase, including a revision of the placement of the oil filler, and provision of a platform for direct mounting of the fuel tank. The oil pressure gauge was substituted with an oil pressure indicator, non-detachable starting handles were introduced, and cylinder heads now accepted 14mm spark plugs. Individual canister (pepper-pot) style silencers were offered as a replacement for the characteristic curved exhaust pipes and single silencer of the Mk1 engine. The magneto was changed to a BTH type MD2, and this was used interchangeably with the Wico Series A (spec A1310BZ) impulse magneto to the end of production. The carburettor remained unchanged. For identification, the serial numbers for T300 Mk2 engines are preceded by the letters TA..

The T300 Mk2 engine was bought in quantity by Auto Diesels Ltd of Uxbridge, manufacturers of electrical generating and compressor sets for the home and export markets. In addition, a marine engine version of the T300 Mk2 was offered from the start, complete with Norman's own design of stern gear with a feathering 10 inch propeller. This engine had no governors fitted, speed being controlled by throttle lever. Another significant user of the T300 Mk2 engine was Thomas Green & Son (Leeds) who used the T300 Mk2 engine in powered lawn mowers. Production of the T300 Mk2 continued after the company was absorbed into the Auto Diesels Braby Group, and finally finished in 1968. About 7500 T300 Mk2 engines were made.

=== T600 ===
After WW2 a larger version of the T300 engine was developed. This new engine was twice the size (600cc) and power (6 hp at 1800rpm) of the T300, and was designated the T600 Mk1 (although a Mk2 was never produced). Development and testing started in 1945, but the first commercial engine was not produced until May 1946. The T600 is superficially similar in arrangement to the T300, but is fitted with sheet steel cowling to direct the cooling air around the cylinders, and external induction pipes. Magneto options and exhaust arrangements are the same as the T300, and a marine version driving a 12-inch propeller was produced. A small number of engines running on propane gas were also developed. Main customers remained Auto Diesels, and Thomas Green & Son. Production of the T600 continued after the company was absorbed into the Auto Diesels Braby Group, and finally finished in 1968. About 4250 T600 engines were made. For identification, serial numbers are preceded by the letter TL.

=== 1B ===
A single cylinder air cooled diesel engine was sold between 1960 and 1964. It was not manufactured by Norman, but was bought-in from The Bradford Diesel Engine Co., of Shipley, Yorkshire, and badged for resale as a Norman product. This 520cc engine developed 5 hp at 1500rpm and 6 hp at 1800rpm. Only about 75 of these engines were sold.

== Other products ==
Norman Engineering Co produced a variety of other products including air compressors and tyre pumps. Prototype engineering was also undertaken for Armstrong Siddeley, including engines, gearboxes and assembly of prototype products. Automobile and aircraft components were produced from the early days until at least 1939.
