= Markfield Beam Engine and Museum =

Coordinates: 51°34′55″N 0°3′42″W

Markfield Road Pumping Station
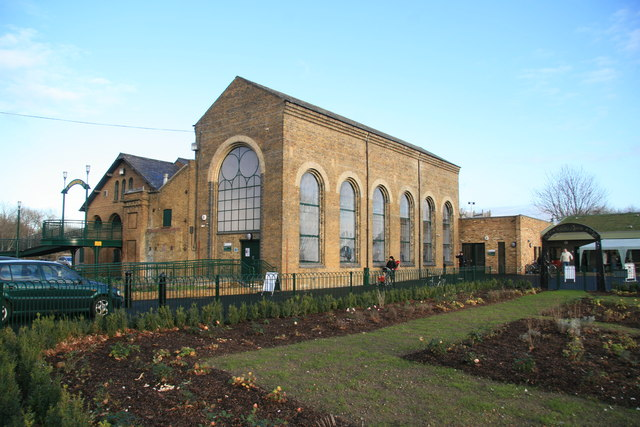

- Location within London Borough of Haringey
- Location: Tottenham; London, N15; United Kingdom
- OS grid reference: TQ 34410 88782

History
- Built: 1886; 140 years ago
- Original use: Sewage treatment

Site notes
- Current use: Museum
- Owner: Heritage and Communities Trust
- Website: www.mbeam.org

Listed Building – Grade II
- Designated: 1974
- Reference no.: 1358862

Markfield Road Pumping Station, now known as Markfield Beam Engine and Museum or sometimes just as Markfield Beam Engine is a Grade II listed building containing a 100 horsepower (75 kW) beam engine, originally built in 1886 to pump sewage from Tottenham towards the Beckton Works. The grounds of the building now form a public park known as Markfield Park. The River Moselle joins the River Lea at this location.

== Markfield Beam Engine ==
Markfield Beam Engine is a free-standing steam engine with a 27 feet (8.2 m) flywheel that moves a 21 feet (6.4 m) beam. The beam drives two single-acting plunger pumps. Each pump is 26 inches in diameter and has a 51-inch stroke. When the machine was operational it had a working speed of 16 rpm and each pump could move 2,000,000 imperial gallons (9,100,000 L; 2,400,000 US gal) a day.

The engine is finely decorated, with doric style columns and acanthus leaves.

== History ==
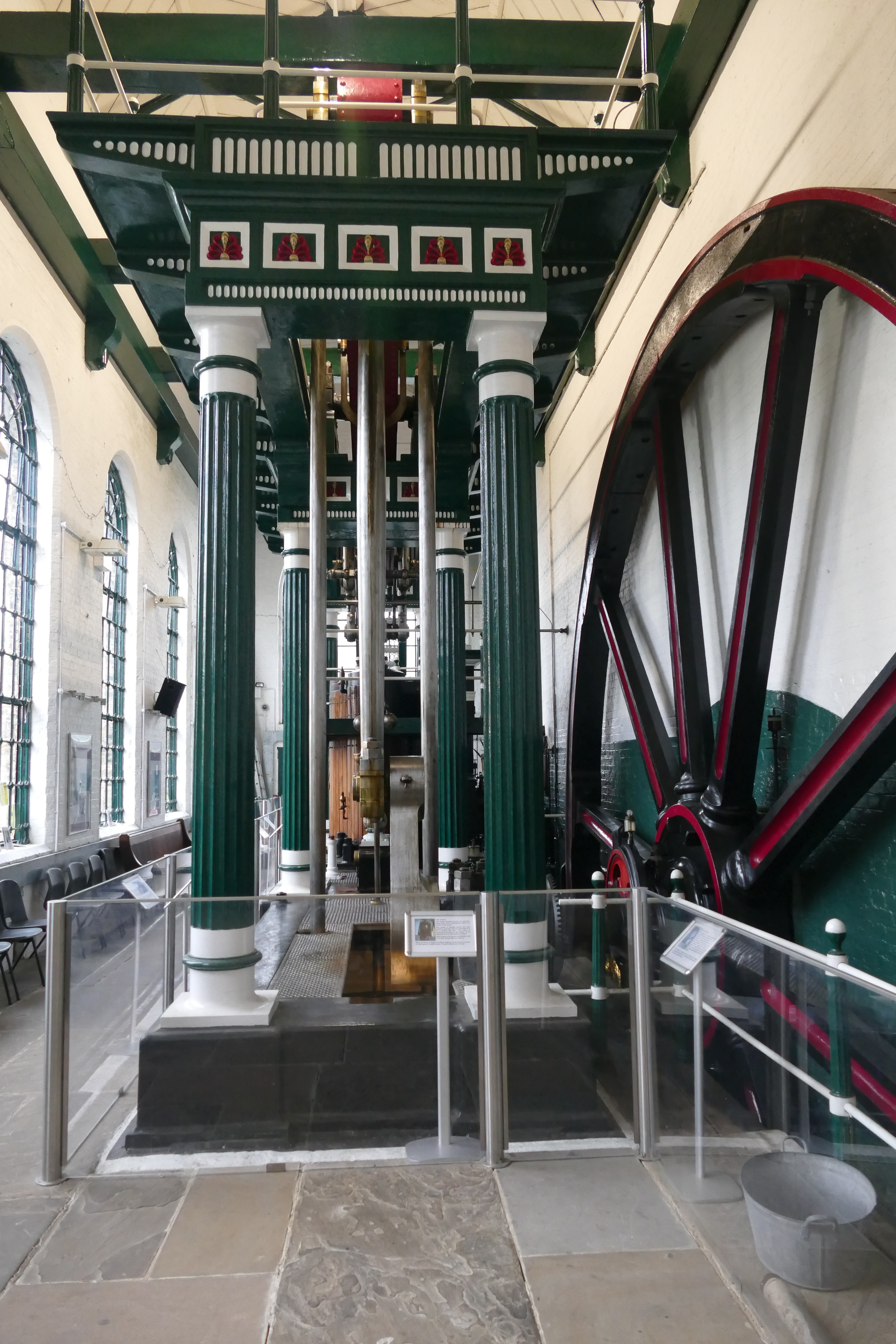
The 27 ft flywheel on display

The sewage works opened in 1864, The scheme was led by the Tottenham and Wood Green Drainage Board, and was connected to the London County Council drainage system and the Northern Outfall Sewer. The current beam engine was built by Wood Brothers of Sowerby Bridge, Yorkshire, in 1886 and commissioned in 1888, replacing an earlier 45 horsepower beam engine. It is the only surviving Wood Brothers eight column engine in situ. It was used continuously from its installation until 1905, when it was relegated to occasional duty for stormwater pumping. The works were finally closed for operation in February 1964, having been replaced by Deephams Sewage Treatment Works in Edmonton.

In 1970, the River Lee Regional Park Authority took a lease on the engine house, and a group of volunteers took on the task of restoring the engine, coming together as the River Lee Industrial Archaeology Society. The engine house and engine were Grade II listed in 1974. Markhouse Beam Engine and Museum was formed in 1984.

Over £3 million has been spent on restoring the engine, building and surrounding grounds, a full restoration of the park was completed by April 2010, and the park, museum, and beam engine re-opened for public access. The funding was secured through various sources including the Heritage Lottery Fund, Football Foundation, DCLG and Big Lottery Fund. The museum is open on selected Sundays and Bank Holidays, and the engine is occasionally run for public display.

In 2025 the museum merged with the nearby Walthamstow Pumphouse Museum to form the Heritage and Communities Trust.
