= Teapot Island =

Museum in Kent, England

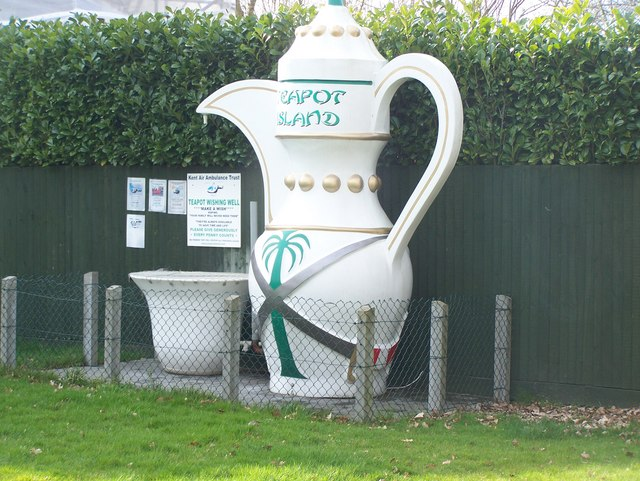
- A wishing well in the cafe garden of Teapot Island.
- Established: 2003
- Location: Yalding, Kent
- Coordinates: 51°13′18″N 0°25′05″E
- Collection size: 8,400 Teapots
- Website: Official Website

Teapot Island was a teapot museum in Kent, England. The museum grew from the personal teapot collection of owner Sue Blazye, which started when her grandmother gave her a teapot in 1983, encouraging other family members and friends to do the same.

== History ==
After Sue Blayze acquired her first teapot in 1983 - a terracotta clay teapot with painted flowers, her collection grew and eventually led to her needing a larger space to house it. She established Teapot Island in Yalding, in November 2002. The building used for the collection used to be a cafe called the Riverside Diner, which had been in operation since the 1950s. The collection stood at over 8,500 teapots in 2024, and was valued at around £250,000.

Teapot Island was featured in the Guinness Book of World Records in 2004, for being the largest collection of teapots. The museum lost this title in 2011, when it was awarded to a man in China with a collection of 30,000. In 2011, the museum was featured in the book Crap Days Out, in which the authors stated: "It's awful if you don't like teapots. But it's probably all right if you do."

In 2014, King Charles III and Queen Camilla visited the museum, with Camilla purchasing a novelty camel teapot as a souvenir.

In 2023 the couple put the property up for sale, stating they wished to retire. The property was initially listed for £950,000, with the price later being reduced to £875,000. The teapot collection was not included in the property sale and was purchased by a Bournemouth collector in 2026.
