= Norman Cycles =

British defunct vehicle manufacturer

Coordinates: 51°8′9″N 0°52′4″E

- Industry: Manufacturing
- Headquarters: United Kingdom

Norman Cycles was a British bicycle, autocycle, moped, and motorcycle manufacturer in Ashford, Kent, England.

The company and its products are remembered today by the Norman Cycles Club at Willesborough Windmill, in Willesborough, Ashford. The Norman museum is in the Windmill's barn and displays some of the company's mopeds and bicycles.

== History ==
The company was founded shortly after World War I as the Kent Plating & Enamelling Co by brothers Charles and Fred Norman, making frames in a garden shed off Jemmett Road, Ashford. In the 1920s they moved to larger premises in Victoria Road, Ashford, and progressed to producing cycles.

In 1935, they had a factory built in Beaver Road, Ashford, and the company was renamed Norman Cycles Limited. In 1938, it produced an autocycle (a heavier-duty bicycle with a small engine - later commonly known as a moped). In addition to cycles the company went on to produce mopeds and light motorbikes (with motors supplied by manufacturers including Villiers and British Anzani; Sachs engines were used for the Norman Nippy moped).

The company produced many thousands of cycles and motorbikes. Weekly production was said to peak at 5,000 bikes, 600 mopeds and 120 motorbikes. It exported to Commonwealth countries using the Rambler trademark. The company had sporting success. By 1950, Norman Cycles had been acquired by Tube Investments, which used the Raleigh name for cycles.

The Ashford factory closed in 1961. Although products bearing the Norman name continued to be made (Nottingham for cycles and Smethwick for mopeds and motorbikes), the heyday had passed and the name ceased in sales literature after 1963. In tribute, a road close to the site of the 1935 factory is named Norman Road.

Norman Cycles does not have any connection to Norman Engineering Co of Leamington Spa and Warwick, makers of industrial engines.

== Bicycles ==
- Norman Imp
- Norman Continental
- Norman Invader
- Norman Atalanta
- Norman Conquest
- Norman Attacker
- Norman Beaver
- Norman Light Roadster
- Norman Sabre
- Norman Safety Cycle
- Norman Tricycle 2P
- Norman Rapide

== Autocycles ==
- Norman Motobyk Tricycle

== Mopeds ==
- Norman Nippy - most had Villiers engines; the Mark IV had a Villiers 3K (49cc) single-cylinder engine, leading-link front fork and swinging-arm rear suspension
- Norman Lido

== Motorcycles ==
- Norman B1
- Norman B1 Sports
- Norman B2
- Norman B2C (Trials)
- Norman B3 Roadster
- Norman B3 Sports
- Norman B4 Roadster
- Norman B4 Sports
- Norman TS

== See also ==
- List of bicycle manufacturing companies
