= New Mill, Willesborough =

Windmill in Willesborough, Kent, England

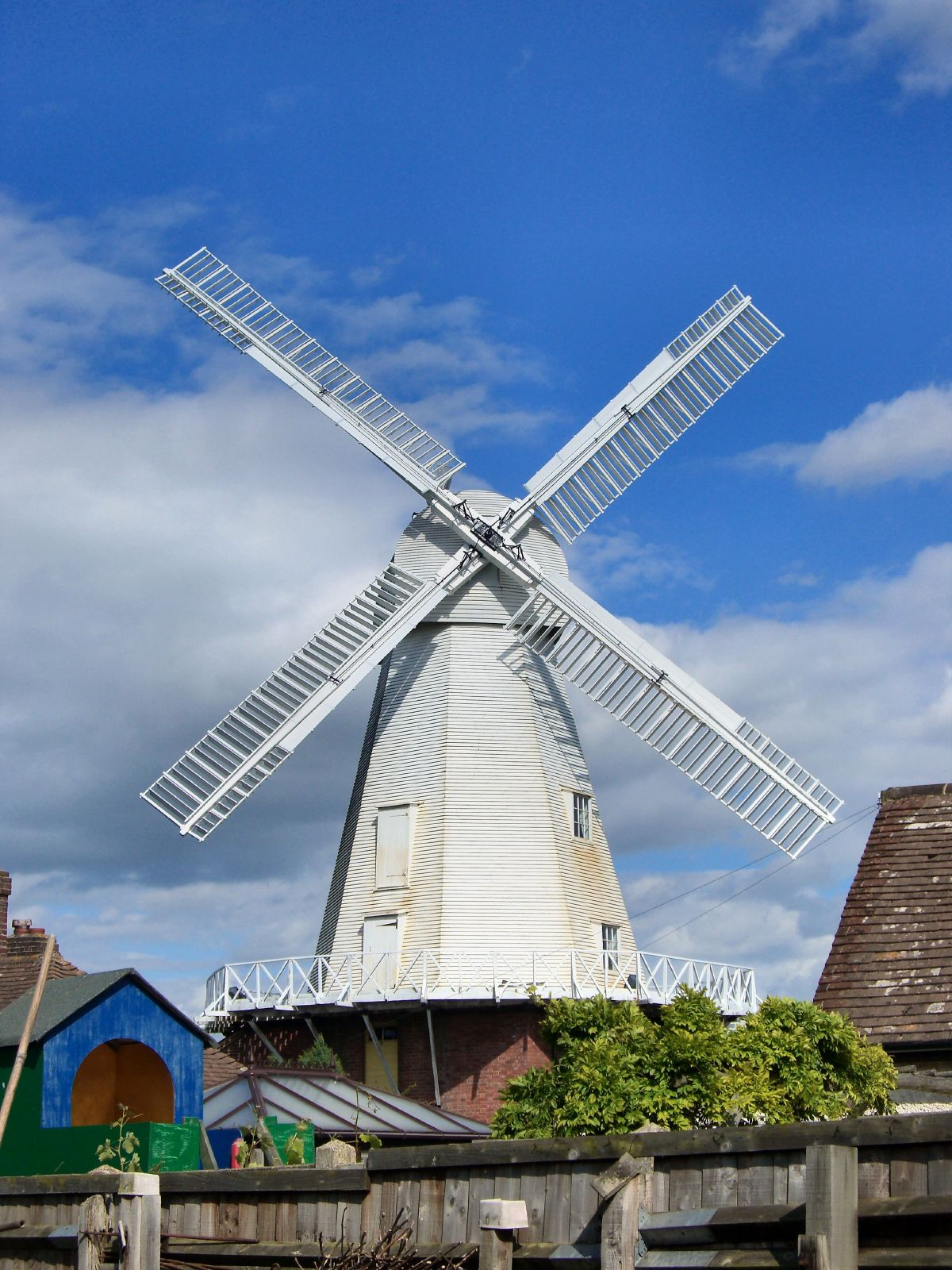
- Willesborough Windmill in 2007

Origin
- Mill location: Willesborough, Ashford
- Grid reference: TR 0313 4213
- Coordinates: 51.14228°N 0.9025°E
- Operator(s): Kent County Council
- Year built: 1869

Information
- Purpose: Corn mill
- Type: Smock mill
- Storeys: Four-storey smock
- Base storeys: Two-storey base
- Smock sides: Eight-sided
- No. of sails: Four
- Type of sails: Patent sails
- Windshaft: Cast iron
- Winding: Fantail
- Fantail blades: Eight bladed
- Auxiliary power: Oil engine
- No. of pairs of millstones: Four pairs

New Mill is a Grade II* listed smock mill in Hythe Road, Willesborough, Ashford, Kent. It stands just west of junction 10 of the M20 motorway. It was built in 1869 and is now a museum open to the public.

== History ==
New Mill was built in 1869 by John Hill, the Ashford millwright, replacing an earlier smock mill. The mill was worked by the Cornes family until the First World War, and by the Manwaring family from 1920 until 1938 when the mill last worked by wind. The mill was then sold to T Denne and Sons and used for storage. The fantail was sold to Barham mill in 1946 and installed on that mill. In 1969 the mill was bought by Tom Robbins and remained in his ownership until it was bought, in a very dilapidated state, and fully restored in 1991 to its former glory by Ashford Borough Council for the benefit of the citizens of Ashford and the public at large.

The mill makes its own stoneground wholemeal bread flour, turning one set of stones with the power of a 14 horsepower (10 kW) Hornsby engine. The mill, with its neighbouring barn, is licensed for weddings, Christenings, (civil ceremonies) and many other meetings and functions. The Mill complex is open from April to the end of September on Saturdays, Sundays and Bank Holiday Mondays from 2pm to 5pm. School and group visits can be arranged for weekdays.

In 2006 the mill was awarded a Heritage Lottery Grant which enabled the replacement of the sails. The new sails were fitted on 13 April 2007. Part of the grant was spent on producing an Education pack for use on school visits. The windmill is now fully operational and able to mill flour using wind or the engine. The mill is licensed to hold wedding ceremonies.

== Norman Museum ==
Norman Cycles was a bicycle, autocycle, moped, and motorcycle manufacturer based in Ashford, and the mill's barn complex houses the Norman Museum, where they have some mopeds and bicycles on display. The Norman Cycles Club is based at the Windmill.

== Description ==
New Mill is a four-storey smock mill on a two-storey brick base with an attached miller's cottage. It has four patent sails carried on a cast-iron windshaft. It drives four pairs of millstones by wind, with a fifth pair powered by an auxiliary engine. This was a steam engine until 1911, then an oil engine and latterly an electric motor. The Brake Wheel is of composite construction, with an iron centre and wooden rim. This drives a cast-iron Wallower on the Upright Shaft, which carries a cast-iron Great Spur Wheel, which drives the millstones overdrift.

== Millers ==
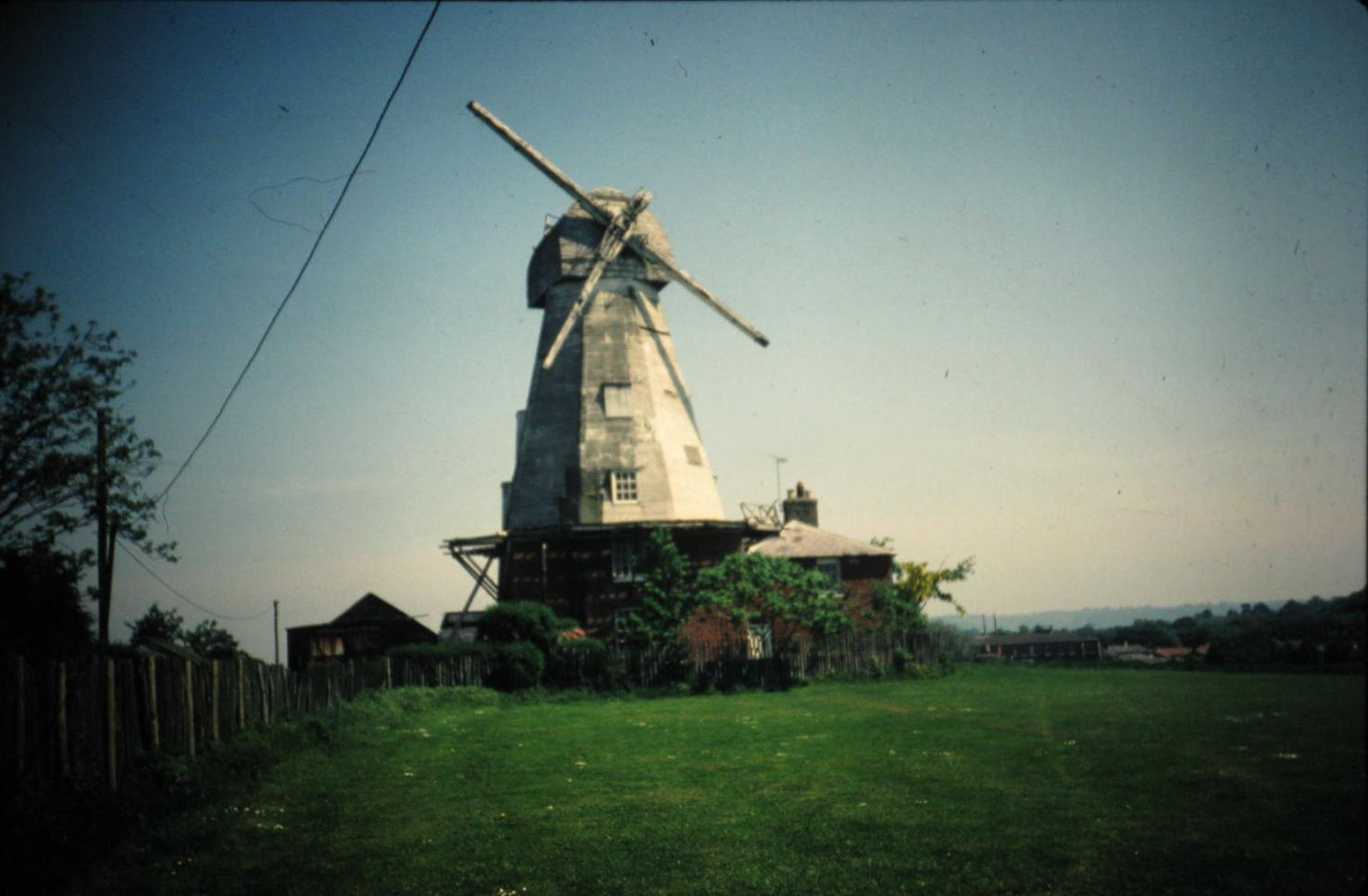
Mill in 1982

- Cornes & Son 1869 - 1918
  - Thomas Sellins 1869 - 1904
  - John Cobb 1904 - 1940
- William Manwaring 1920 - 1938
  - Cecil Coltham 1931- 1940
- T Denne & Sons 1938 - 1969
  - Cecil Coltham 1957 - 1968

References for above:-
