= Kent Museum of Freemasonry =

Coordinates: 51.280979°N 1.076102°E

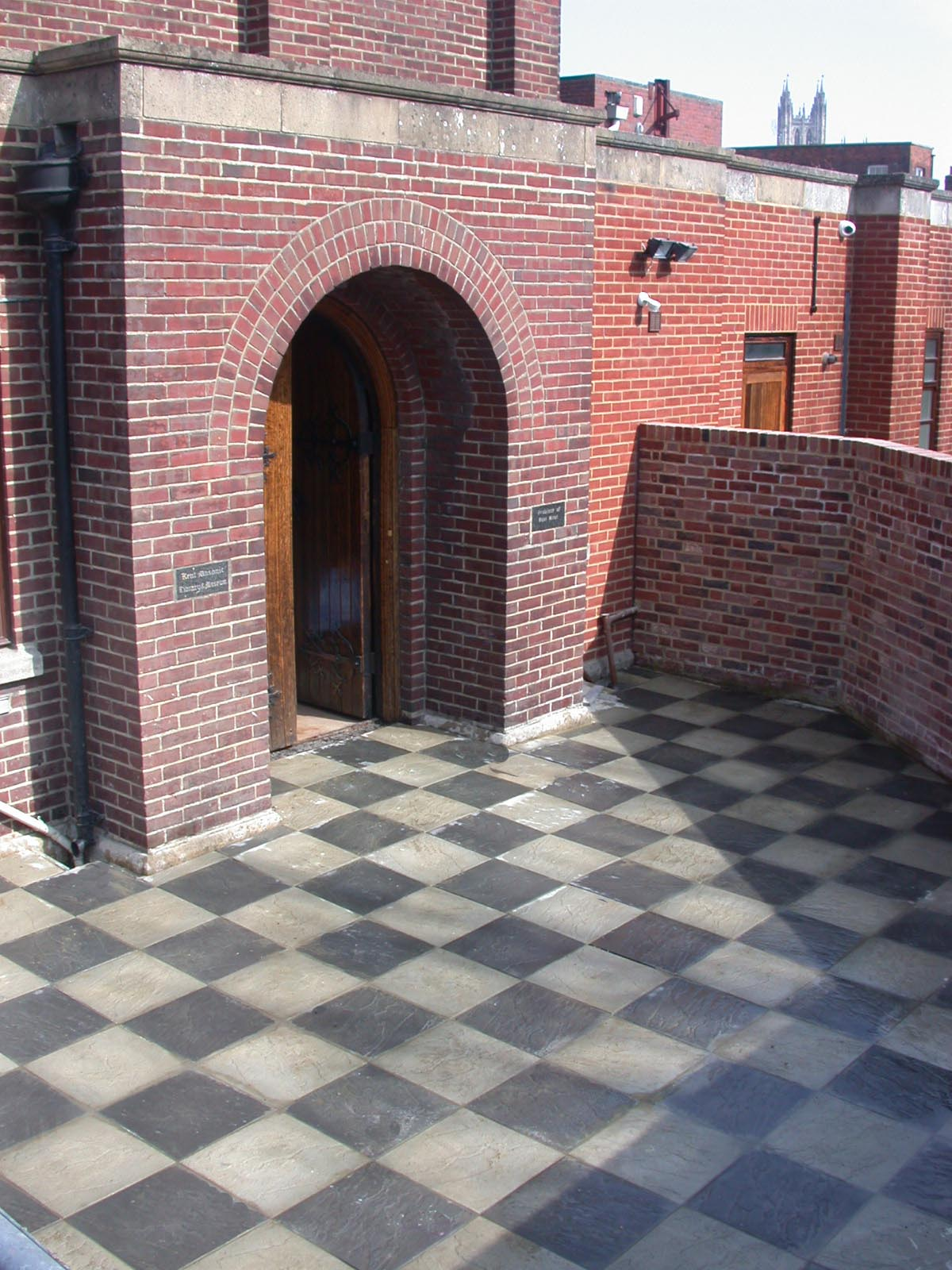
- Established: 1933
- Location: St Peter's Place, Canterbury, Kent; CT1 2DA
- Type: Local history museum, Masonic museum, Heritage museum, Masonic
- Curator: David Birch
- Public transit access: Rail: Canterbury West; Canterbury East; Buses: National Express, Stagecoach
- Website: Kent Museum of Freemasonry

The Kent Museum of Freemasonry, is a museum in St Peters Place, Canterbury, Kent. Administered by the Freemasonry Province of East Kent, The museum is situated between Canterbury East and West railway stations. The nearest Public Car Park is in Pound Lane.

== Information ==
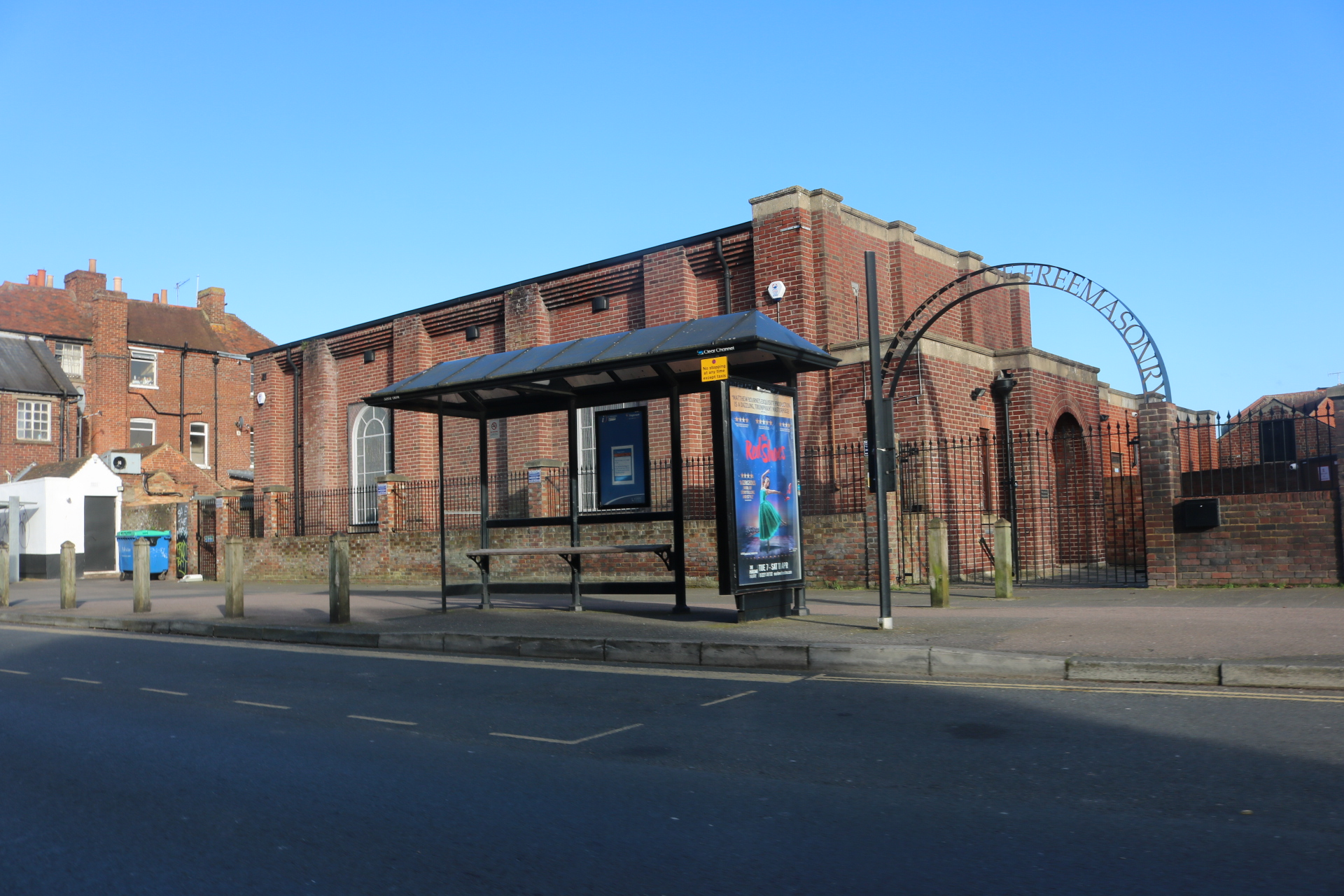
The Kent Museum of Freemasonry, Canterbury

The Museum Of Freemasonry is an Arts Council Accredited Museum, and hosts a collection of masonic artefacts, glassware, porcelain, paintings and historical documents. Its collection of masonic manuscripts, regalia and books covers all Masonic orders through the ages. In its collection is notably the original Anderson Constitutions from 1723 and the five 19th century stained glass windows from the demolished Freemasons Hall in London. The library has around 3000 volumes compromising of individual masonic orders, references and research books. Around 30 display boards provide visitors information.

== History ==
F.G. Haywood was In 1930 appointed for construction of the museum. The oak entrance door was donated from Hales Place by Jimmy Edwards. The museum first opened in April 19th 1933. In 199, the Kent Masonic Library and Museum Trust became a registered charity No.1018784. The museum was temporary closed to the public in early 2011 for an extensive redevelopment, eventually reopening in September 2012 in a new walk through format

== Bibliography ==
- Gahan, RFW (1994) A Short History of the Kent Masonic Library and Museum
