= Old Brook Pumping Station =

Historic site in Kent, England

Old Brook Pumping Station Museum

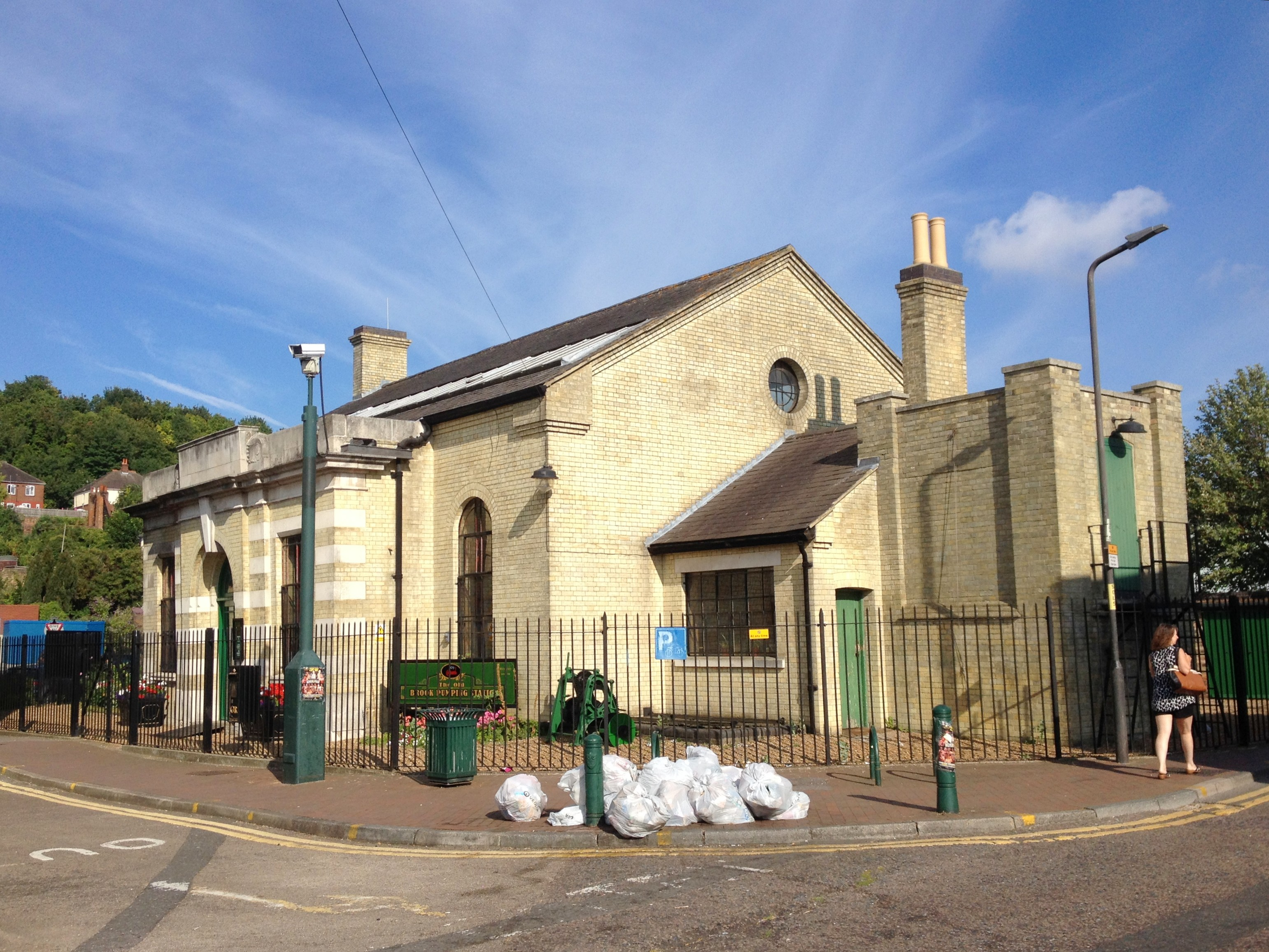
- The Old Brook Pumping Station, now operating as a museum

- Location of Old Brook Pumping Station in Kent
- Established: 1929
- Location: The Brook (road), Chatham, Kent, ME2 9AQ, England
- Coordinates: 51°22′56″N 0°31′39″E
- Type: Industrial heritage museum
- Owner: Medway Council
- Website: https://www.oldbrookpumping.co.uk/

Old Brook Pumping Station, was a water pumping station operating in Chatham, Kent from 1929 until 1980. It now survives as a working museum.

== History ==
In the 16th century, due to an earth dam (between Rochester and Chatham Dockyard), called the 'Land wall'. The Old River Bourne and its surrounding marshlands were cut off from the River Medway.

Between 1575-1610, a tide mill was built on The Brook (the renamed Old River Bourne), close to the River Medway.

By 1765, the town of Chatham had increased dramatically and the Brook was now covered by a road. The former marshland was used as area for low-class housing and alleyways. During 1821 and 1823, No.18 The Brook was lived in by Charles Dickens (aged 9).

The old river had been changed into culverts, which with cesspits were used to dispose of waste.

In 1801, the population of Chatham was 10,505, then by 1901 it had grown to 36,944. But the current drainage culverts had not been updated and they were beginning to fail and the health of the towns people was dropping. Including bouts of Cholera. Also within the River Medway, fish stocks and oyster beds were also failing, according to court leet papers.

In 1852, Edward Gotto was employed to carry out the national General Board of Health Survey for the 'General Board of Health' (under the Public Health Act 1848). The survey highlighted the diseases and poor sanitation in the town. This then prompted work to improve the drainage and sewerage of the town. Including brick built sewers and covered culverts.

In 1909, a tramway line was running along the course of the old Brook River.

In 1920, the 'Rochester and Chatham Joint Sewerage Board' was formed and given a seal from the Minister of Heath.

The 'Rochester and Chatham Joint Main Drainage Scheme' was then developed at a cost (in total) of £650,000. The drainage scheme was officially opened on 4 December 1928. This included a main sewer pipe running under New Road (in Chatham), up to Gillingham and onwards to Motney Hill on the Rainham Marshes (now within the Riverside Country Park).

The function of the Old Brook Pumping Station was to lift foul water from the lowest part of Chatham to the main sewer. It was opened in September 1929.

The function of the Old Brook Pumping Station was taken over in April 1979 by a new, fully automatic station (using electric pumps) on the opposite side of The Brook which is still in existence. The Old Brook Pumping Station is now listed as an ancient monument.(Monument Number ME321). It is protected under part 1 of the Ancient Monuments and Archaeological Areas Act 1979. It is also classified as a Zone 1 Urban Archaeological Zone under the Medway Council planning zones.

After being disconnected in October 1979, it was sold by the Southern Water Authority to Medway Council for £1. It is now a sister project of the Rochester Guildhall Museum.

From March 1984 to September 1984, the Medway Industrial Archaeology Group (MIAG) carried out restoration and improvement work on the Old Brook Pumping Station and then started opening to the public.

== Operation ==
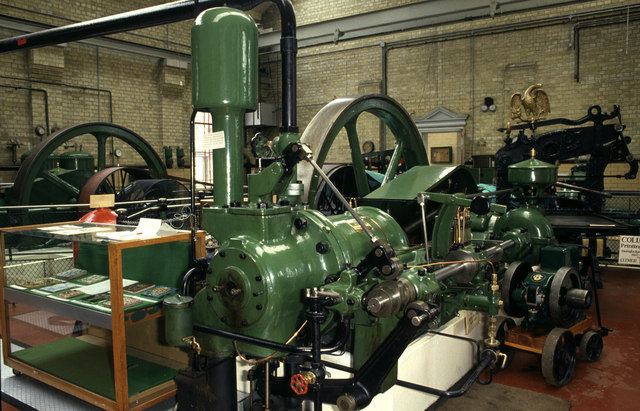
The two horizontal single cylinder diesel engines that drove centrifugal pumps. There are other exhibits depicting local industry (including the big eagle on the Columbian printing press in the background)

The storage tank beneath the station hall has a foundation about 28 feet deep.

During times of extreme flooding, surface water and effluent would be pumped via the Storm tower and storm water culvert directly into the River Medway. The waste discharged into the river would be greatly diluted under these conditions.

The pumping station houses two 14 inch Campbell single cylinder diesel engines which used to drive the pumps during storms and flooding.

One electric motor driven Blackstone 6 inch Unchokeable Pump capable of 50,000 gallons per hour and a duplicate backup machine. This was used for normal dry weather flow. One electric motor driven Blackstone 8 inch Unchokeable Pump capable of 100,000 gallons per hour and another duplicate backup machine. This was used for storm water flow. For storms slightly over the six time dry water flow, the second 8 inch pump would automatically cut in to discharge, via the Storm tower, into the 5 by 3 1/2 foot culvert into the River Medway. There is a maximum lift into the storm tower of 20 feet. Storm water in excess of these flows were handled by the 2, belt driven Blackstone 14 inch Unchokeable Pumps delivering 250,000 gallons per hour. There are two of these pumps driven by 56 hp Campbell oil (diesel) engines.

== Current use ==
The Old Brook Pumping Station is managed and maintained by the 'Medway Industrial Archaeology Group' with the support of Medway Council.

On the site is an old Victorian printing press on which the 'Rochester Gazette' was printed, and a number of model windmills. An old Aveling and Porter road roller built by the famous Strood factory stands in the grounds.

It is open on: June to September: Saturdays, 11am-3pm October to May: first Saturday of the month, 11am-3pm

Entry is free-of charge. There are also steam and hot air engines to see

The Brook pumping station is the official headquarters of MIAG (Medway Industrial Archaeology Group).
