= Pines Garden =

Garden in St Margaret's at Cliffe, Kent, England

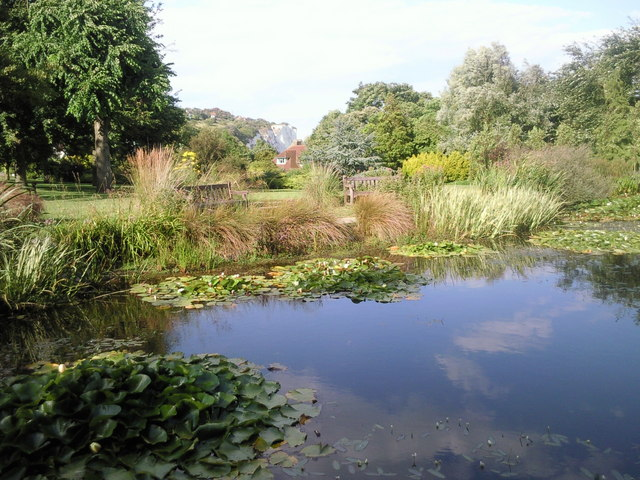
- The Pines garden
- Interactive map of Pines Garden
- Location: St Margaret's at Cliffe, near Dover, UK
- Coordinates: 51.2836°N 0.7857°E
- Area: 6 acres (24,000 m^{2})
- Opened: 1971
- Owner: The Bay Trust
- Operator: The Bay Trust
- Status: open wed-sun, 10am - 4pm
- Collections: Arboretum, exotic shrubs, rose garden,
- Website: Pines Garden website

Pines Garden is a 6-acre area of parkland, located on the winding beach road from St Margaret's at Cliffe village down to the beach at St Margeret's Bay, near Dover.

== History ==
=== Fred Cleary ===
Frederick Ernest Cleary (1905-1984) CBE, was originally a Chartered Surveyor from Crouch End, London. Later, he formed a very successful company ‘Haslemere Estates’, who refurbished many of the City of London’s fine old buildings during the 70's and 80's. In 1970, he formed the Bay Trust to 'preserving the natural environment in the proximity of St. Margaret’s Bay and undertaking related environmental education initiatives'. This was due to his work in inner London, where he created green and restful spaces in the City, often on the site of bomb damaged sites. His philanthropic activities and his writing of two books ‘Beauty and the Borough’ and ‘The Flowering City’, resulting in him earning the nickname ‘Flowering Fred’. In 1975 Fred purchased and refurbished an old rectory building ('Ripple Down House') in Ringwould. This became an environmental education centre for children.

Alistair Gould, the founder's grandson is on the current trust.

=== Garden ===
The Bay Trust bought the house and the gardens in 1960s. Edda Jones, an artist, was staying in the house, while the Trust added to the garden before they opened it to the public But later the cottage would be demolished as it was not energy inefficient and could not be converted. The trust then opened the garden to the public.

The garden has many features including a waterfall and adjoining lake, a grass labyrinth and an organic kitchen garden with around 40 different species of fruit and vegetables.

The garden has been run organically since 2002. Due to the ethos of the Trust management, who wish to work in harmony with nature and this includes recycling, composting and uses natural predators to control pests

The garden also has a statue of Winston Churchill by Oscar Nemon.

The garden also hosts many projects by contemporary artists.

== The Calyx Centre ==
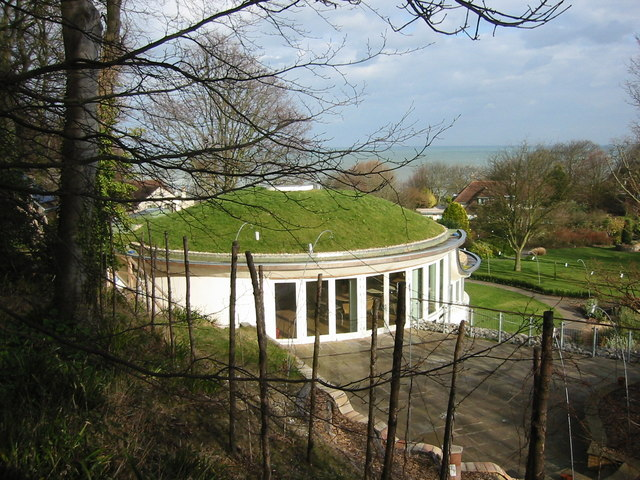
The Calyx Centre

Note: Calyx means "husk" or "pod" and the centre is pod shaped.

Built on the demolished site of the original bungalow of the garden.

The conference centre (built to passiv-haus standards) was designed, by a collaborative team of 'Helionix Designs' (architect "Alistair Gould"), Structural Engineer "Cameron Taylor" (now part of Scott Wilson Group)and 'Conker Conservation'. The Bay Trust and designers are all members of the 'Carbon Free Group'.

It has pneumatic rammed chalk walls (maximum thickness of 650mm).

Its domed roof (Catalan vault) uses techniques patented by Spanish-American architect Rafael Guastavino in 1885. 'Rings of local clay tiles are glued together with fast setting gypsum plaster to form a self-supporting dome that is constantly in a state of compression'.

The project was completed in Autumn 2006.

Total embodied energy of the building is calculated to be 299 MJ/m2, while embodied carbon is 33 kg CO_{2}/m2. This is compared to 1393 MJ/m2 and 147 kg CO_{2}/m2 for a similar concrete building shell.

The result is a venue that achieves savings of 66% in target energy consumption and 67% in target CO_{2} emissions.

Hot water is supplied via solar thermal panels, while a small woodchips-fed biomass generator produces heat for an underfloor heating system if additional warmth is required.

Water management is also another essential part of the design. The water supply comes from a sustainably managed bore-hole with all rainwater run-off feeding back into this supply. Grey and black water is fed through a reed bed filter and the resulting cleaned water is then can be used to feed the Pines Garden plants.

It claims to be the first conference building in Europe to reach beyond carbon neutral and become carbon negative. It also has a grass roof.

The venue is available for private hire and gained a licence for wedding and other ceremonies.

== St. Margaret’s Museum ==
St. Margaret's Museum and The Pines Garden Tea Room are located at Pines Garden. The museum features changing displays about local history including St Margaret's during WW2, and one-time resident Noël Coward. Other topics focus on area natural history and the environment.

== Awards ==
Since opening in 2006, the Calyx has won several regional, national and international awards.

- Kent Business Environment Award 2006
- Winner of the Building magazine Sustainability Awards 2007, Sustainable Building of the Year (small project) Award
- The Sustainable City Award 2007 (organised by the City of London Corporation)
- Winner of the Special Small Project of the Year category Institution of Structural Engineers Building Awards 2007 (see also Structural Awards)
- David Alsop Sustainability Award, Commendation (also Institution of Structural Engineers Building Awards 2007)
- Overall Winner of the Kent Design Awards in 2007/2008.
- Best Small Building (under £1 million), Winner
- The roof helped 'Accurate Roofing' being nominated at the 'Flat Roofing Alliance' awards in London.
