= List of governors of the Falkland Islands =

The following is a list of governors of the Falkland Islands. Historically, several countries have had leaders on the islands with varying titles and degrees of power.

== List of governors ==
=== Administrator of the French Settlement of Fort St. Louis ===
From	To	Name
1764	1767	Louis Antoine de Bougainville

=== Military Administrators of the British Settlement of Port Egmont ===
From	To	Name
1767	1768	Capt. John MacBride, HMS Jason
1768	1769	Capt. Rayner
1769	1770	Capt. Anthony Hunt, HMS Tamar
1770	1770	Capt. George Farmer, HMS Favourite
1771	1772	Capt. John Burr, HMS Hound
1773	1776	Lt. Samuel Wittewrong Clayton

=== Military Administrators of the Spanish Settlement of Puerto Soledad ===
From	To	Name
1767	1773	Felipe Ruíz Puente
1773	1774	Domingo Chauria
1774	1777	Francisco Gil Lemos
1777	1779	Ramón de Carassa
1779	1781	Salvador de Medina
1781	1783	Jacinto de Altolaguirre
1783	1784	Fulgencio Montemayor
1784	1786	Augustín Figueroa
1786	1787	Pedro de Mesa y Casto
1787	1788	Ramón Clairac
1788	1789	Pedro de Mesa y Casto
1789	1790	Ramón Clairac
1790	1791	Juan José de Elizalde
1791	1792	Pedro Pablo Sanguinetto
1792	1793	Juan José de Elizalde
1793	1794	Pedro Pablo Sanguinetto
1794	1795	José Aldana Ortega
1795	1796	Pedro Pablo Sanguinetto
1796	1797	José Aldana Ortega
1797	1798	Luis de Medina Torres
1798	1799	Francisco Javier de Viana
1799	1800	Luis de Medina Torres
1800	1801	Francisco Javier de Viana
1801	1802	Ramón Fernández Villegas
1802	1803	Bernardo Bonavía
1803	1804	Antonio Leal de Ibarra
1804	1805	Bernardo Bonavía
1805	1806	Antonio Leal de Ibarra
1806	1809	Bernardo Bonavía
1809	1810	Gerardo Bordas
1810	1811	Pablo Guillén

=== Military and Civil Commander of Puerto Luis (Port Louis) ===
From	To	Name
1829	1831	Luis Vernet
1832	1832	Juan Esteban Mestivier †

=== Military Administrators of the British Settlement of Fort Louis ===
From	To	Name
1833	1838	Lt. Henry Smith
1838	1839	Lt. Robert Lowcay
1839	1839	Lt. Robinson
1839	1841	Lt. John Tyssen

=== Lieutenant Governor of the Falkland Islands at Anson's Harbour ===
From	To	Name
1841	1843	Lt. Richard Clement Moody

=== Governor of the Falkland Islands at Port Stanley ===
Flag of the governor of the Falkland Islands, 1876–1925

Flag of the governor of the Falkland Islands, 1925–1948

Flag of the governor of the Falkland Islands, 1948–1999

Current flag of the governor of the Falkland Islands, 1999–present

From	To	Name
1843	1848	Lt. Richard Clement Moody
1848	1855	Lt. George Rennie
1855	1862	Capt. Thomas Edward Laws Moore
1862	1866	Capt. James George Mackenzie
1866	1870	Sir William Cleaver Francis Robinson
1870	1876	Colonel George Abbas Kooli D'Arcy
1876	1880	Jeremiah Thomas Fitzgerald Callaghan
1880	1891	Thomas Kerr
1891	1897	Sir Roger Goldsworthy
1897	1904	Sir William Grey-Wilson
1904	1915	Sir William Allardyce
1915	1920	Sir William Douglas Young
1920	1927	Sir John Middleton
1927	1931	Sir Arnold Hodson
1931	1934	Sir James O'Grady
1935	1941	Sir Herbert Henniker-Heaton
1941	1946	Sir Allan Wolsey Cardinall
1946	1954	Sir Miles Clifford
1954	1957	Sir Oswald Raynor Arthur
1957	1964	Sir Edwin Arrowsmith
1964	1970	Sir Cosmo Haskard
1971	1975	Ernest Gordon Lewis
1975	1977	Neville French
1977	1980	James Roland Walter Parker
1980	2 April 1982	Sir Rex Hunt

=== Argentine Military Commanders during the 1982 Occupation ===
From	To	Name
2 April 1982	3 April 1982	Divisional General Osvaldo Jorge García (interim)
3 April 1982	14 June 1982	Brigadier General Mario Benjamín Menéndez

=== British Military Commander at Port Stanley ===
From	To	Name
14 June 1982	25 June 1982	Major General Sir Jeremy Moore

=== Civil Commissioner of the Falkland Islands at Port Stanley ===
From	To	Name
25 June 1982	16 October 1985	Sir Rex Hunt

=== Governors of the Falkland Islands at Stanley (and Commissioner for South Georgia and the South Sandwich Islands from 1985) ===
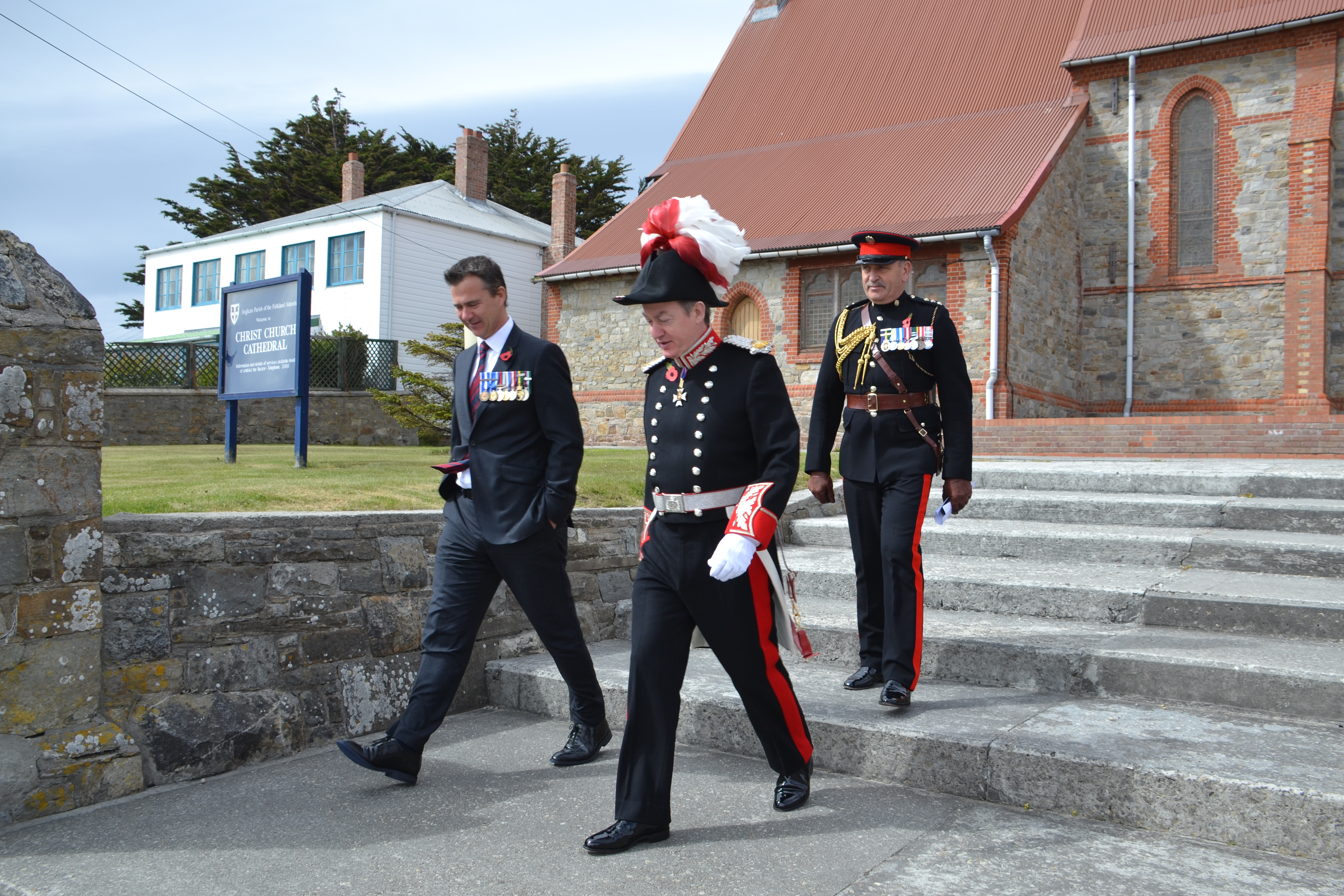
Then Governor Colin Roberts (centre) in his uniform as governor, Christ Church Cathedral, Remembrance Sunday 2016

From	To	Name
1985	1988	Sir Gordon Jewkes
1988	1992	William Fullerton
1992	1996	David Tatham
1996	1999	Richard Ralph
1999	2002	Donald Lamont
2002	2006	Howard Pearce
2006	2010	Alan Huckle
2010	2014	Nigel Haywood
2014	2017	Colin Roberts
2017	2022	Nigel Phillips
2022	2025	Alison Blake
2025	present	Colin Martin-Reynolds
