= Commissioner for the British Antarctic Territory =

- Coat of arms of the British Antarctic Territory

- Standard of the commissioner
- Incumbent; Jane Rumble since February 2025
- Appointer: Charles III as King of the United Kingdom
- Term length: At His Majesty's pleasure
- Inaugural holder: Edwin Porter Arrowsmith; Merrick Baker-Bates; First Commissioner

The Commissioner for the British Antarctic Territory, is the head of government of the British Antarctic Territory, a British Overseas Territory of the United Kingdom. The commissioner is appointed by the monarch of the United Kingdom on the advice of the Foreign and Commonwealth Office.

== History ==
Prior to 1962, the area was a part of the Falkland Islands Dependencies and as such was administered by the Governor of the Falkland Islands. The British Antarctic Territory was established as a separate British overseas territory in 1962. From 1962 to 1990, the Governor of the Falkland Islands also held the office of high commissioner for the territory. In 1990, administration of the BAT was transferred to a separate commissioner based in London. Between 1998 and 2024, the commissioner of the BAT also served as Commissioner of the British Indian Ocean Territory.

== List of high commissioners and commissioners ==
=== High commissioners (1962-1990) ===
During this time also served as the Governor of the Falkland Islands

- Edwin Porter Arrowsmith (1962–1964)
- Cosmo Dugal Patrick Thomas Haskard (1964–1970)
- Ernest Gordon Lewis (1971–1975)
- Neville Arthur Irwin French (1975–1977)
- James Roland Walter Parker (1977–1980)
- Rex Masterman Hunt (1980–1985)
- Gordon Wesley Jewkes (1985–1988)
- William H. Fullerton (1988–1990)

=== Commissioners (1990-present) ===
These are non-resident and based in London. Since 1998, has also served as Commissioner of the British Indian Ocean Territory.

- Merrick Baker-Bates (1990–1992)
- P. Newton (1992–1995)
- Anthony Longrigg (1995–1997)
- John White (1997–2001)
- Alan Huckle (2001–2004)
- Tony Crombie (2004–2006)
- Leigh Turner (2006–2008)
- Colin Roberts (2008–2012)
- Peter Hayes (2012–2016)
- John Kittmer (2016–2017)
- Ben Merrick (2017–2021)
- Paul Candler (2021–2024)
- Jane Rumble (2025-present)

== See also ==
- British Antarctic Territory
