= Rex Hunt (diplomat) =

Governor, Falkland Islands, 1926–2012

Sir Rex Hunt CMG
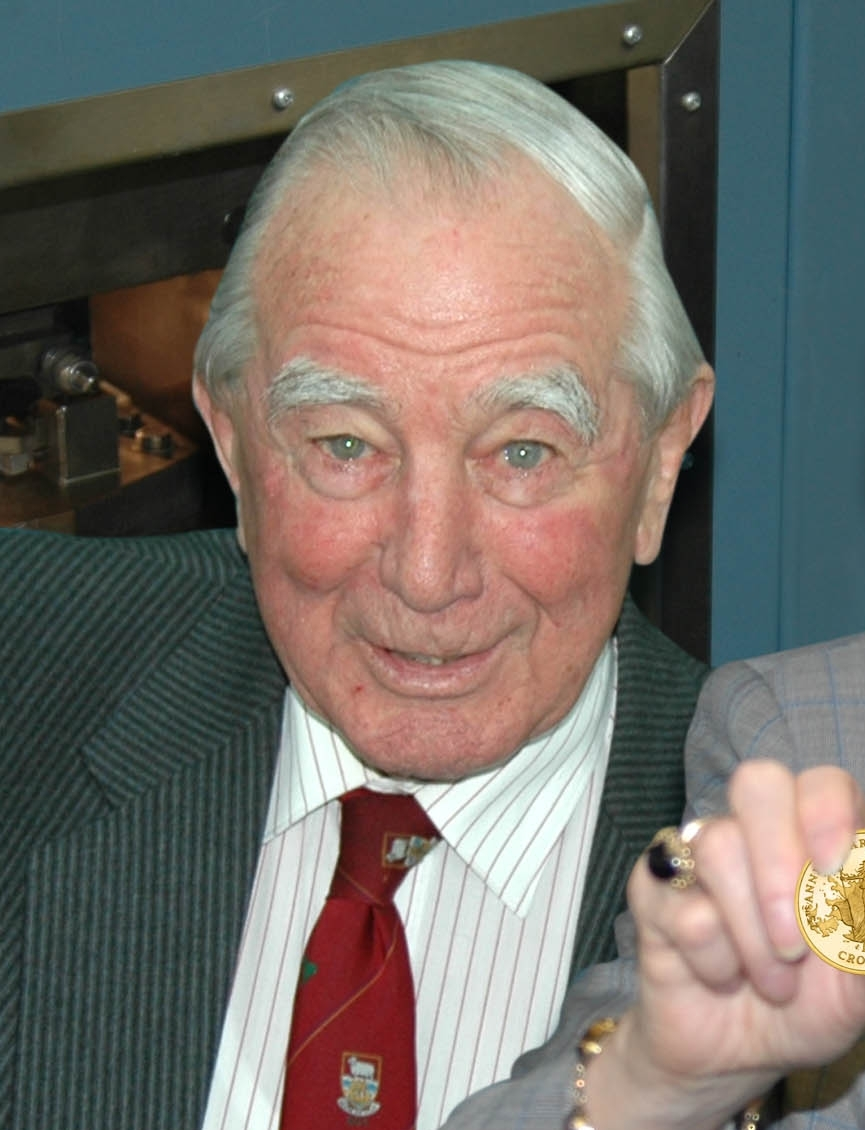
- Rex Hunt in 2007

Governor of the Falkland Islands
- In office 14 January 1980 – 16 October 1985
- Monarch: Elizabeth II
- Chief Executive: David G. P. Taylor
- Preceded by: Sir James Parker
- Succeeded by: Gordon Jewkes

Personal details
- Born: Rex Masterman Hunt; 29 June 1926 Redcar, North Yorkshire, England
- Died: 11 November 2012 (aged 86) Stockton-on-Tees
- Spouse(s): Mavis, Lady Hunt
- Children: Antony Hunt; Diana Hunt
- Education: St Peter's College, Oxford
- Occupation: Diplomat and colonial administrator

Military service
- Allegiance: United Kingdom
- Branch/service: Royal Air Force
- Years of service: 1944–1948
- Rank: Flight lieutenant
- Unit: No 5 Squadron; No 26 Squadron
- Battles/wars: World War II, 1982 invasion of the Falkland Islands (surrendered)

Sir Rex Masterman Hunt, CMG (29 June 1926 – 11 November 2012) was a British Government diplomat and colonial administrator. He was Governor, Commander-in-Chief, and Vice Admiral of the Falkland Islands (and concurrently High Commissioner of the British Antarctic Territory) between 1980 and September 1985. During the 1982 invasion of the Falkland Islands, he was taken prisoner and temporarily removed from the Falklands, before returning after the successful re-capturing of the islands to serve the rest of his term.

== Early life ==
Rex Hunt was born on 29 June 1926 in Redcar in the North Riding of Yorkshire, England. He was the son of Henry William Hunt (1893–1982), a commercial clerk, and Ivy (d. 1959), née Masterman. He was educated at Sir William Turner's Grammar School in Redcar. After leaving school, he began to read jurisprudence at St Peter's College, Oxford, before leaving to serve in the military. He returned to his studies in October 1948, and graduated from the University of Oxford with a second-class honours Bachelor of Arts (BA) degree in 1950.

During the Second World War, Hunt was an air cadet from 1941, a member of the Officers' Training Corps, and the Home Guard. He joined the Royal Air Force as an airman in 1944, receiving a commission as a pilot officer on 21 December 1945. He learnt to fly at RAF Cranwell, but did not see combat in Europe during the war. He was promoted to flying officer (war substantive) in June 1946, with the permanent promotion to that rank in December the same year. In August 1946, he was transferred to No 5 Squadron in British India, where he flew Tempest IIs, before transferring to West Germany with No 26 Squadron in August 1947. He left active service in September 1948, and held the rank of flight lieutenant in the Royal Air Force reserves in September 1950, relinquishing his commission in December 1953.

== Diplomatic career ==
In 1952, he joined the Colonial and Diplomatic Service of the British Government's Foreign Office. and received his first foreign posting as District Commissioner in Uganda in 1962. He then served as First Secretary in Kuching, Sarawak, 1964–65, and Jesselton, Sabah 1965–67, both in the newly independent Malaysia, and then in Brunei 1967. In 1968 he was transferred to Ankara in Turkey, and subsequently served as Head of Chancery in Jakarta, Indonesia, 1970–72. After a brief spell back in England, he was appointed Consul-General at the British Embassy in Saigon in January 1974, and was there at the time of the fall of South Vietnam in 1975 at the end of the Vietnam War. He was transferred to Kuala Lumpur in 1976, and served as Deputy High Commissioner to Malaysia 1977–79.

== Falklands governorship ==
On 14 January 1980, as a final career posting, he was appointed as the Governor of the Falkland Islands and High Commissioner of the British Antarctic Territory. The UK's sovereignty of the Falkland Islands was contested by the Government of Argentina, and with a military dictatorship in place in Buenos Aires, this claim was being asserted with more intent than ever before. Unknown to the British Government, plans were underway to seize the Islands by force of arms, without a prior declaration of hostilities. In the meantime, Hunt had been dispatched to the Islands as their new Governor, with instructions from the Foreign Office to try, during his tenure administering them, to persuade the recalcitrant islanders that the Islands being moved into an Argentinian governmental sphere of influence, given its geographical proximity compared to that of the United Kingdom, was perhaps in their best long-term interest. Hunt soon discovered that the Falkland Islanders were adamantly opposed to any ceding of their sovereignty in this direction, and he relayed this information back to London; arguing that on consideration of the matter he personally agreed with their views. Hunt's seniors in London did not receive the news well, and concluded that Hunt had "gone native". When government minister Nicholas Ridley attempted in 1980–1981 to negotiate a diplomatic solution to the contested sovereignty of the Falkland Islands, local islands politician Adrian Monk made a broadcast on 2 January 1981 outlining the local population's opposition that Hunt described as "Churchillian".

=== Falklands War ===
On 2 April 1982, under cover of a night approach across the southern Atlantic Ocean, the Argentine Navy and Argentine Army carried out a seaborne invasion of the Falkland Islands. Hunt made his official residence, Government House in Port Stanley, the operational headquarters for the small Royal Marines garrison on the islands, sending his family and domestic staff away to safer houses. His housekeeper took with her a portrait photograph of the Queen and a bottle of gin. Government House quickly became the scene of a brief battle between the Royal Marines garrison and Argentine commandos. With the British forces facing overwhelming military and logistical odds, Hunt, after an extended exchange of small arms fire, with a handful of casualties, gave the order to the Royal Marines to lay down their arms. He then went to Stanley Town Hall, wearing his full dress uniform, complete with medals, gold braid, neck ribbons, sword, sash and plumed cocked hat to face the Argentine invasion force's Commandant, Vice admiral Carlos Büsser, addressing him with: "You have landed unlawfully on British territory, and I order you to remove yourself and your troops forthwith". In response he was met with laughter, roughed up, his medals stolen and placed under confinement by the Argentines. Four hours later, under armed escort, he was flown out of the Falklands on an aeroplane to Montevideo, in Uruguay. During the weeks of the war, Hunt stayed in London, while his wife and son were in a house in Kent. He remained in this forced exile during the occupation of the Falkland Islands, until they were militarily liberated on 14 June 1982 by a British seaborne taskforce dispatched by the British Government, after which he returned again in full dress uniform and re-established its self-governance. Victorious British forces paraded past in review while he was clad in full dress uniform. He continued to serve in the post of its Governor until 1985.

External image
- Hunt at his desk shortly after returning to his post

== Later life ==
In retirement he wrote his memoir My Falkland Days, which was published in 1992. He was chairman of the Falkland Islands Association for several years. He retired as chairman in 2004 and moved to Elton, County Durham, near to his childhood home of Redcar.

== Personal life ==
In 1951, Hunt married Mavis Amanda Buckland (born 1928), daughter of George Albert Buckland, of Chingford, Essex. They adopted two children.

Hunt died in Stockton-on-Tees on 11 November 2012. His funeral, with a pallbearer party from the Royal Air Force, was held at All Saints' Church in Hutton Rudby on 23 November 2012, with a burial in the church's graveyard. His gravestone bears an engraved image of a map outline of the Falkland Islands. A memorial service was simultaneously held in Port Stanley. On the announcement of his death by the British Government, Prime Minister David Cameron stated that Hunt "should be a hero to everyone in Britain for his actions during the Falkland War."

== Honours ==
He was appointed a Companion of the Order of St Michael and St George (CMG) in 1980, and knighted on 11 October 1982, in recognition of services during the Falklands War. He was made a Freeman of the City of London 1981, and a Freeman of Stanley, Falkland Islands, in 1985. In 1987 Hunt was appointed as the Honorary Air Commodore of No. 2729 (City of Lincoln) Squadron (Royal Auxiliary Air Force Regiment).

Ribbon	Description	Notes
	Knight Bachelor (Kt)	11 October 1982
	Order of St Michael and St George (CMG)	Companion, 1980
	Defence Medal	
	War Medal	
	South Atlantic Medal with Rosette	1982
	Uganda Independence Medal	9 October 1962

== Publications ==
- My Falkland Days. Politico's. 2002. ISBN 978-1842750179.

== Cultural references ==
Hunt was portrayed by Ian Richardson in the 1992 BBC television drama An Ungentlemanly Act, a dramatization of the Argentinian invasion of the Falklands in 1982.
