= Paul Candler =

British civil servant

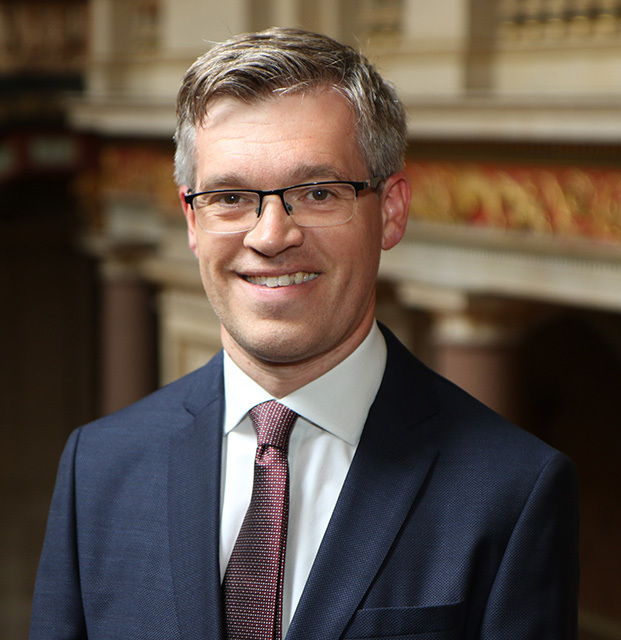

Commissioner of the British Indian Ocean Territory and the British Antarctic Territory
- In office 1 July 2021 – August 2024
- Monarchs: Elizabeth II; Charles III
- Prime Minister: Boris Johnson; Liz Truss; Rishi Sunak; Keir Starmer
- Preceded by: Ben Merrick
- Succeeded by: Nishi Dholakia

Acting Governor of Anguilla
- In office 26 June 2023 – 11 September 2023
- Monarch: Charles III
- Premier: Ellis Webster
- Preceded by: Dileeni Daniel-Selvaratnam
- Succeeded by: Julia Crouch

Paul Candler is a British civil servant who served as Commissioner for the British Antarctic Territory and British Indian Ocean Territory and director of British Overseas Territories from 2021 to 2024. He was also the acting Governor of Anguilla in 2023. Prior to his tenure as commission he held multiple positions in the Home Office and Ministry of Justice.

== Career ==
Candler was the private secretary to Cabinet Secretaries Richard Wilson, Baron Wilson of Dinton and Andrew Turnbull, Baron Turnbull from May 2001 to February 2003. At the Department for Culture, Media and Sport Candler was the head of film policy from February 2003 to July 2005. Candler worked at the Home Office from July 2005 to January 2007.

Candler worked for the Ministry of Justice. From January 2013 to July 2015, he was deputy director of youth justice policy. After Brexit, Candler was deputy director of the Ministry of Justice's department managing the United Kingdom's withdrawal from the European Union.

Candler was director of International, Rights and Constitutional Policy from February 2018 to June 2021. In this position he was in charge of managing relations between the United Kingdom and the crown dependencies of Guernsey, Jersey, and the Isle of Man.

On 1 July 2021, Candler succeeded Ben Merrick as the Commissioner for the British Antarctic Territory and British Indian Ocean Territory. He held the position until August 2024. Between the end of Dileeni Daniel-Selvaratnam's term and the arrival of Julia Crouch, Candler was the acting Governor of Anguilla.

== Works cited ==
=== News ===
- Weekes, Eulana (5 June 2023). "Paul Candler to serve as interim Governor of Anguilla, as the island awaits the arrival of its new Governor in September". WINN 98.9 FM. Archived from the original on 6 June 2023.

=== Web ===
- "Gazette 2020-21". British Antarctic Territory. Archived from the original on 1 July 2025.
- "Paul Candler". Government of the United Kingdom. Archived from the original on 1 July 2025.
