= John Kittmer =

British diplomat

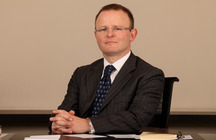

Commissioner for the British Indian Ocean Territory and the British Antarctic Territory
- In office December 2016 – July 2017
- Monarch: Elizabeth II
- Prime Minister: Theresa May
- Preceded by: Peter Hayes
- Succeeded by: Ben Merrick

British Ambassador to Greece
- In office January 2013 – December 2016
- Prime Minister: David Cameron; Theresa May
- Preceded by: David Landsman
- Succeeded by: Kate Smith

Personal details
- Born: 6 July 1967 (age 59) Cuckfield, Sussex
- Domestic partner: David Bates
- Education: Hymers College, Hull; Christ's College, Cambridge; King's College, London; Magdalen College, Oxford

John Kittmer (born 6 July 1967) is a British former diplomat. He was formerly the Commissioner for the British Indian Ocean Territory jointly with the British Antarctic Territory.

== Education ==
Kittmer was born in Sussex in 1967. From the years 1978–1985, he was educated at Hymers College, an independent day school in Hull in the East Riding of Yorkshire in Northern England, where he was taught Ancient Greek by Larry Trewartha and Gerald Thompson. Kittmer then attended Christ's College at the University of Cambridge, where he obtained a BA in Classics (1988), King's College London where he obtained an MA in Modern Greek Studies (2007) and a PhD in Modern Greek Literature (2019), and Magdalen College at the University of Oxford, at which he also studied classics.

== Life and career ==
Kittmer joined the civil service in 1993, first at the Department for Education and Employment before moving to the UK's Permanent Representation to the European Union in Brussels in 1998 as a First Secretary. He returned to London for posts in the FCO in 2002, DEFRA from 2004, the Cabinet Office in 2006–7, and back to DEFRA until 2012.

Kittmer served as the British Ambassador to Greece from January 2013 until December 2016. He was succeeded in this role by Kate Smith in January 2017.

Kittmer was appointed to replace Peter Hayes as the Commissioner for the British Overseas Territories of the British Indian Ocean Territory and the British Antarctic Territory starting in December 2016. In June 2017, he left this post on a career break to continue his academic studies. In June 2019, he left the civil service permanently.

Kittmer currently sits on the board of directors of the Greek oil tanker company Okeanis.

== Personal life and honours ==
Kittmer self-identifies as a 'northerner'. Kittmer entered into a civil partnership with David Bates in 2007. He was awarded the Grand Cross of the Order of the Phoenix in April 2021.

Diplomatic posts
Preceded by David Landsman	British Ambassador to Greece; 2013–2016	Succeeded by Kate Smith
Preceded by Peter Hayes	Commissioner for the British Indian Ocean Territory and the British Antarctic Territory; 2016–2017	Succeeded by Ben Merrick
