= Governor Arthur =

Governor Arthur may refer to:

- Sir George Arthur, 1st Baronet (1784–1854), 37th Governor of Bombay
- Harold J. Arthur (1904–1971), 68th Governor of Vermont
- Oswald Raynor Arthur (1905–1973), Governor of the Falkland Islands from 1954 to 1957 and Governor of the Bahamas from 1957 to 1960
