= David Tatham =

British diplomat, governor and biographer

David Tatham CMG (born 28 June 1939) is a former British diplomat, ambassador, and Governor of the Falkland Islands, 1992–1996. He was also editor of The Dictionary of Falklands Biography.

== Career ==
David Everard Tatham was educated at St Lawrence College, Ramsgate, and Wadham College, Oxford. He joined the Diplomatic Service in 1960 and served at New York, Milan and, after studying at the Middle East Centre for Arab Studies, at Jeddah, Muscat and Dublin as well as at the FCO. He was Ambassador to the Yemen Arab Republic and concurrently to the Republic of Djibouti 1984–87; head of the Falkland Islands department at the FCO 1987–90; Ambassador to the Lebanese Republic 1990–92; Governor of the Falkland Islands (and commissioner for South Georgia and the South Sandwich Islands) 1992–96; and High Commissioner to the Democratic Socialist Republic of Sri Lanka and concurrently to the Republic of Maldives 1996–99.

Tatham retired from the Diplomatic service on leaving Sri Lanka and was adviser on diplomatic training to the Palestinian Authority in 2000. He was district manager for the 2001 United Kingdom census in the area of Ledbury (where he lived) and Ross-on-Wye, and then embarked on The Dictionary of Falklands Biography, including South Georgia, which was published in 2008 (ISBN 9780955898501). He has been chairman of the Falkland Islands Shackleton Scholarship Fund in the UK since 1999, and was chairman of the Falkland Islands Association 2004–11.

Tatham was among 52 senior British diplomats who in 2004 signed a letter to Tony Blair, then British Prime Minister, criticising his Middle East policy. The letter was described as "unprecedented in scope and scale".

== Honours ==
The herb Phlomis tathamiorum is named after Tatham "for voicing the imminence for caring for Lebanon's nature through his activity in Lebanon, and for assisting the authors at starting work for seed banking of Lebanon's natural beauties at Kew Gardens as well as collaborating with England's National Trust to help create a similar entity for Lebanon."

Tatham was appointed CMG in the 1991 New Year Honours.

Diplomatic posts
Preceded by Julian Walker	Ambassador to Yemen and Djibouti; 1984–1987	Succeeded by Mark Marshall
Preceded by Sir Allan Ramsay	Ambassador to Lebanon; 1990–1992	Succeeded by Maeve Fort
Government offices
Preceded by William Fullerton	Governor of the Falkland Islands; 1992–1996	Succeeded by Richard Ralph
Diplomatic posts
Preceded by John Field	High Commissioner to Sri Lanka and the Maldives; 1996–1999	Succeeded by Linda Duffield
