= Myrna T. Semaan =

Lebanese botanist

- Born: 1968 (age 57–58)
- Occupation: botanist

Myrna T. Semaan (born 1968) is a Lebanese botanist, notable for identifying a number of new plant species in Lebanon with Ricardius M. Haber. Her botanical author abbreviation is "Semaan." Her primary area of interest is spermatophytes.

Semaan has also edited several books about Lebanese flora. Adonis River: Valley of the Dancing Shadow received moderate praise for its photography, though the writing was described as florid and confusing, with the most successful portions of the book being the sections about history rather than botany.

== Species ==
- Ballota byblensis (Lamiaceae)
- Salvia fairuziana (Lamiaceae)
- Phlomis tathamiorum (Lamiaceae)

== Other publications ==
- Floral enchantment to Lebanon: Natural heritage from the Mediterranean spaces and species (II). Beirut: Terre du Liban, 2010.
- Orchids of Lebanon: Natural heritage from the Mediterranean spaces and species (I). Beirut: Terre du Liban, 2010.
- Holy Land of the Phoenicians — Adonis River: Valley of the Dancing Shadows. Leogravure, 2013.
