= Thomas Edward Laws Moore =

Rear Admiral, Falklands Governor, Exploorer, and Academic

Thomas Edward Laws Moore FRS
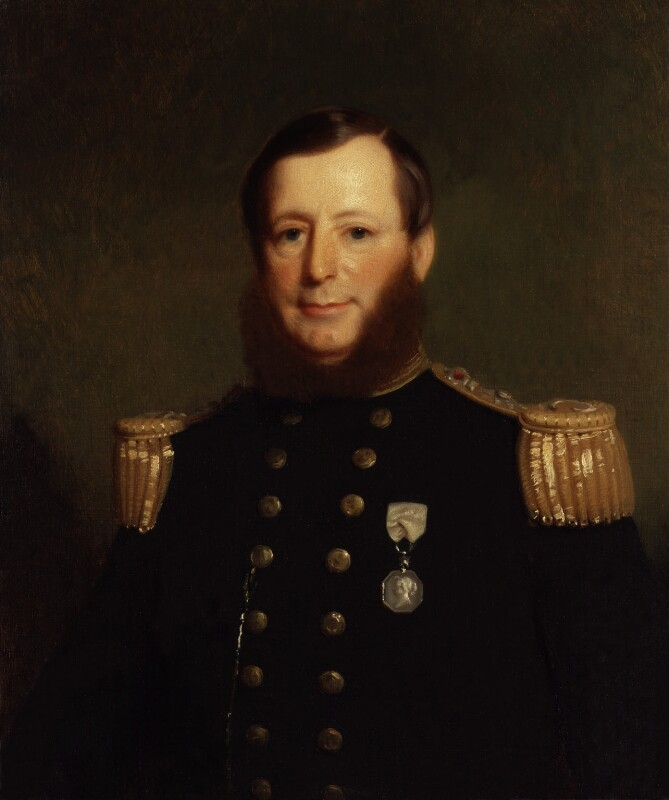
- Portrait of T. E. L. Moore from the National Portrait Gallery, part of Arctic Explorers collection, painted by Stephen Pearce in 1860.
- Born: 9 February 1816; Gillingham, Kent
- Died: 30 April 1872 (aged 56) East Stonehouse, Plymouth, Devon
- Allegiance: United Kingdom
- Branch: Royal Navy
- Rank: Rear-Admiral
- Awards: FRS, Arctic Medal
- Spouses: Emma Jane Taplen, daughter of Lieutenant Thomas Taplen
- Children: Colonel Edward Crozier Sibbald Moore
- Other work: Governor of the Falklands

Rear-Admiral Thomas Edward Laws Moore, FRS (9 February 1816 – 30 April 1872) was a Royal Navy officer and polar explorer. He was Governor of the Falkland Islands from 1855 to 1862. Moore is known for commanding HMS Plover during the search for Franklin's lost expedition and for conducting magnetic surveys in the Antarctic. It is believed that he conducted the last Antarctic expedition under sail alone, and traversed more degrees of longitude south of 60° S than any previous explorer. He was awarded the Arctic Medal for his polar service.

Many places are named after him, including Port Moore, Alaska, and Cape Moore, Antarctica, the latter named by Sir James Clark Ross. Laws is spelled Lawes in some sources.

== Early life ==
Moore was born to John Moore and Mary (née Mearns) in Brompton, Kent, on 9 February 1816. Not much is known about his family prior to his birth; however, both his father and paternal grandfather, Robert Moore, were shipwrights in the Chatham Dockyards. John and Mary also had three other children, Thomas being the youngest child, including Commander Robert Seppings Moore, RN.

He joined the Royal Navy in 1833 as a first-class volunteer and was mate of HMS Terror during the Ross expedition.

== Magnetic surveys ==
Thomas Moore was initially involved in magnetic surveys of the high latitudes of the Antarctic, serving as mate under Francis Crozier on board HMS Terror during the Ross expedition. However, by 1844, large swathes of the south Indian Ocean had still been left untraversed, stretching over 130° south of 60° S.

Erebus and Terror in the Antarctic, by James Wilson Carmichael. National Maritime Museum, London.

In 1844, the British admiralty commissioned the 360-ton barque Pagoda to undertake a magnetic survey as HMS Terror and Erebus were in the Arctic on the ill-fated Franklin Expedition. Moore was selected for command as a result of his previous experience and his prominent role in taking magnetic readings with Crozier.

Over the course of the expedition (5 January 1845 – 7 July 1845), Lt. Moore explored more degrees of longitude south of 60° S than any previous explorer in one of the coldest years on record, traversing waters dense with icebergs, strong prevailing winds, and strong opposing currents. These conditions proved detrimental to Moore's efforts, rendering much of the expedition unsuccessful in the eyes of the admiralty. However, the voyage proved to be a feat of seamanship and was the last voyage of its kind in a sailing ship carried out without the aid of steam. A.G.E. Jones, in Lieutenant T.E.L. Moore RN and the Voyage of the Pagoda 1845 dubbed the expedition as "the only instance of a single ship being employed on such a service, with perilous navigation over a tract of ocean almost entirely unexplored".

== Later life ==
From 1847 to 1852, he commanded HMS Plover, which was searching for Franklin's lost expedition; during the voyage, he called at Stanley, Falkland Islands in 1848. He was promoted to captain in 1852 and was elected a Fellow of the Royal Society in 1854 for his magnetic surveys whilst in command of the Barque Plover. In 1855, Moore accepted the governorship of the Falkland Islands, arriving on 7 November with his family. He was the first governor to reside in Government House, Falkland Islands. His wife died during his governorship in 1859, and he finished his tour in 1862 returning to England.

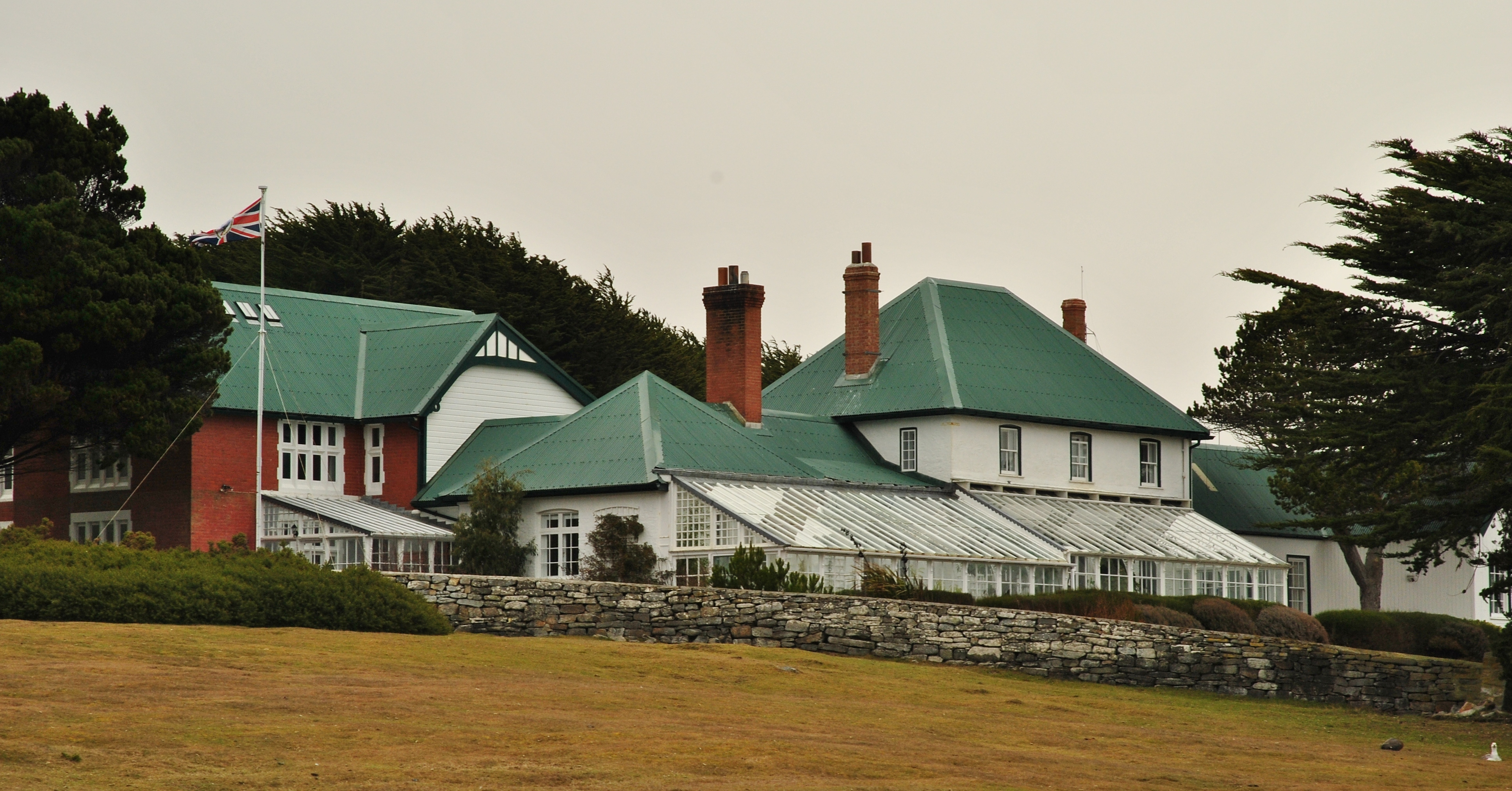
Government House in Stanley

He suffered a stroke in 1871 and died on 30 April 1872, aged 56, at his home in East Stonehouse, from congestion of the lungs. He was buried in the family vault at St George's Church, Plymouth.

He was survived by his second wife, three daughters and a son, Lt-Col Edward Crozier Sibbald Moore. Named in part after Francis Crozier, Edward authored Sanitary Engineering, commanded the Royal Engineers in Bermuda, served on several occasions as acting governor of Bermuda, and designed the Royal Engineers Museum in Gillingham, Kent.
