= Merrick Baker-Bates =

British diplomat (1939–2023)

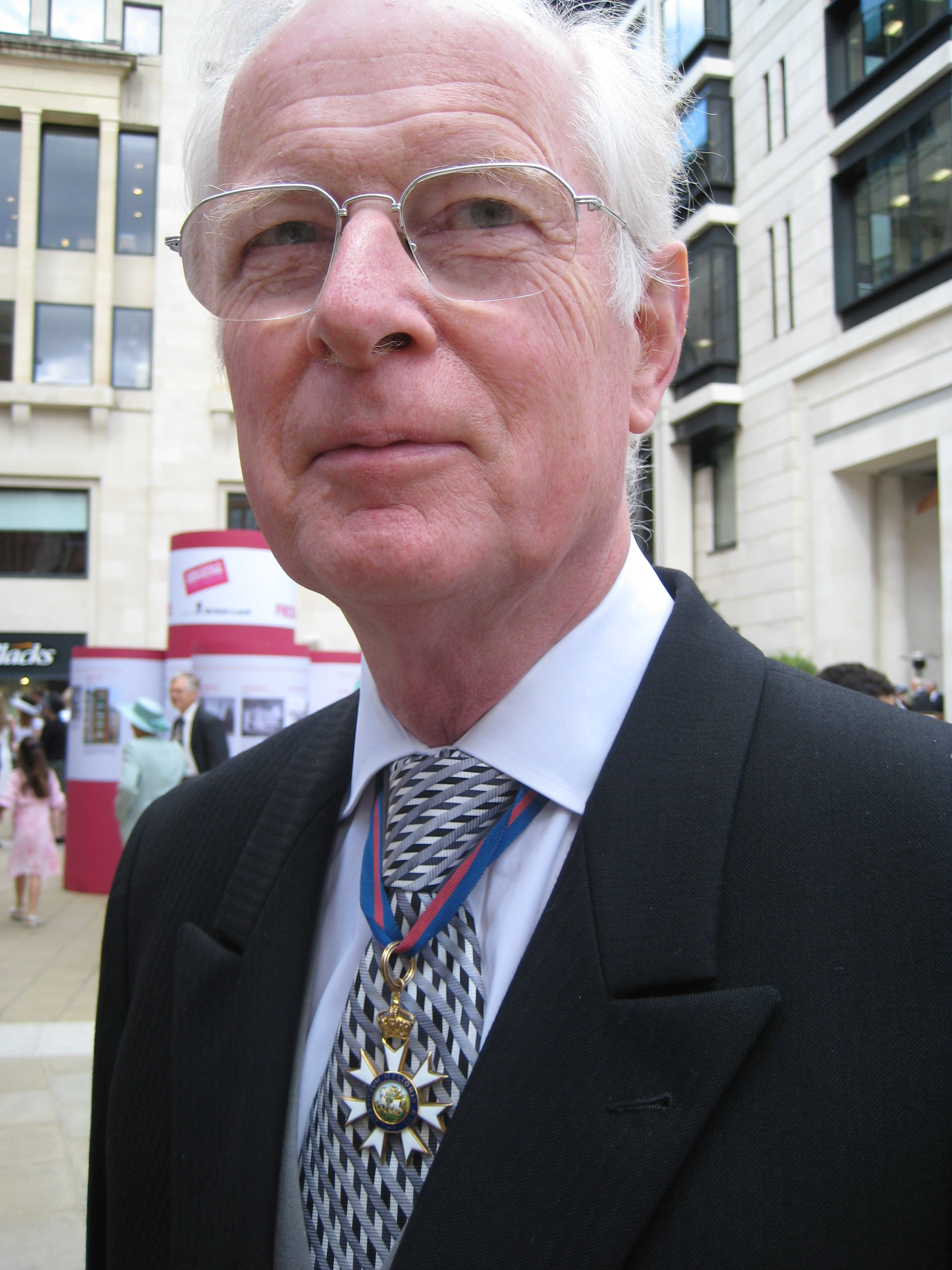
St Paul's Cathedral, London, 2008

Merrick Stuart Baker-Bates CMG, CStJ, (22 July 1939 – 24 February 2023) was a British diplomat and supporter of penal reform.

After studying modern history at Hertford College, Oxford and attending the College of Europe in 1961, he joined the British Diplomatic Service in 1963, starting his diplomatic career in Tokyo as a language student, becoming 3rd and 2nd Secretary there between 1963–68. After being 1st Secretary in Washington 1973–76, he returned to Tokyo as 1st Secretary, later Commercial Councillor 1976–82. He then left the civil service to join Cornes & Co. for three years, re-joining the FCO as Deputy High Commissioner in Kuala Lumpur 1986–89. Becoming the first Commissioner for the British Antarctic Territories in 1990, he was later posted to Los Angeles as Consul-General for five years before his retirement in 1998 to Creaton, Northamptonshire.

During a long and varied retirement working with local and other charities including St John Ambulance (for which he was awarded CStJ) and the church. Becoming a director of the Globe Theatre in 2001, he also served as a sensitivity reviewer marking documents for release at the FCO records office at Hanslope Park.

Baker-Bates died on 24 February 2023, aged 83.

== Honours ==
- Companion of the Order of St Michael and St George (CMG) - 1996
- Order of Saint John (CStJ) - 2010
