= E. C. S. Moore =

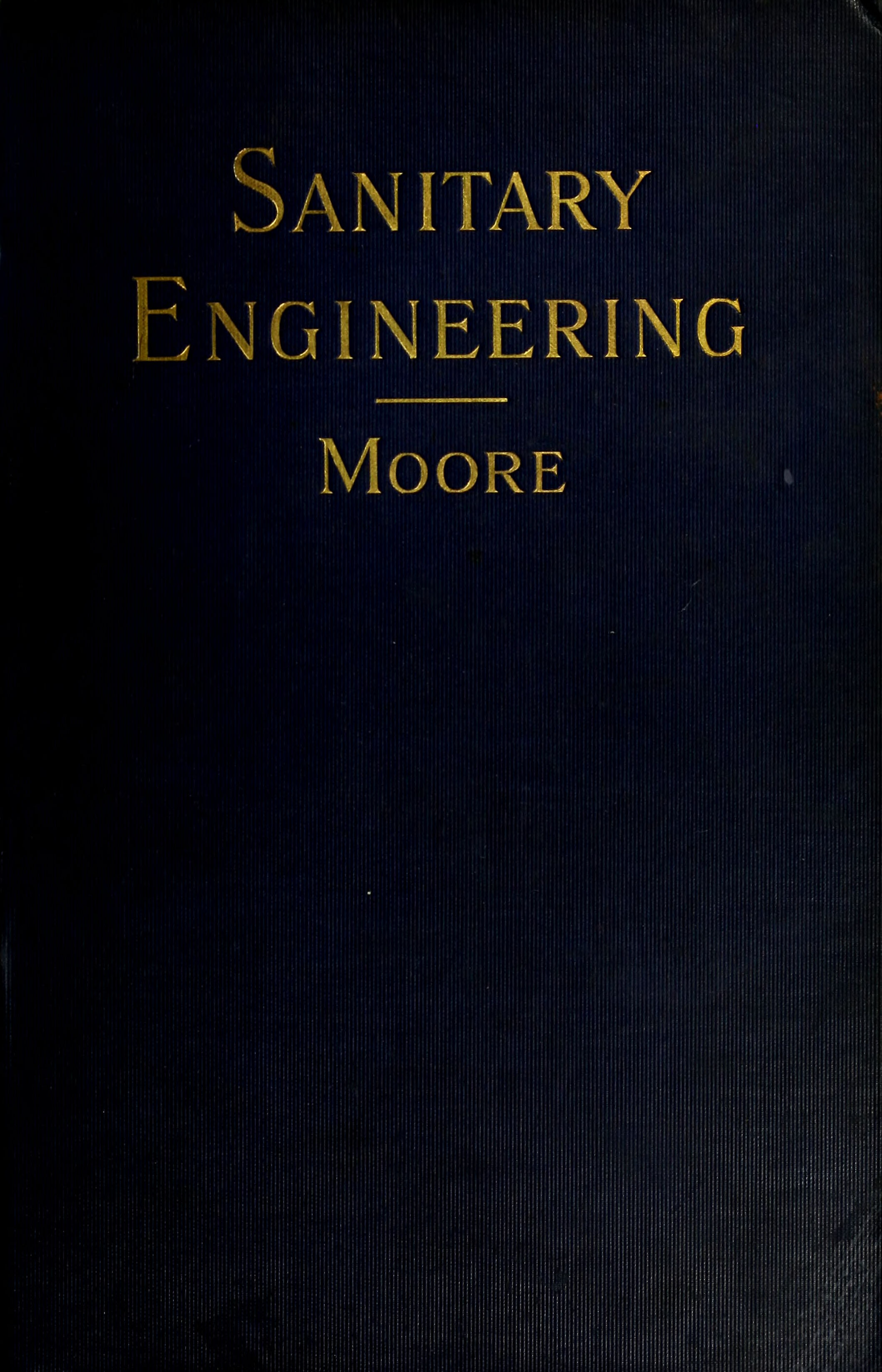
- Sanitary Engineering, by E.C.S. Moore
- Born: Edward Crozier Sibbald Moore; 1844
- Died: 1904 (aged 59–60)
- Spouse: Florence Du Pré
- Relatives: Rear-Admiral Thomas Edward Laws Moore, FRS (father), Admiral Richard Boger of the Blue, and Vice-Admiral Joseph Pearse
- Military career
- Allegiance: United Kingdom
- Branch: British Army
- Rank: Colonel
- Commands: Commanding the Royal Engineers in Bermuda and serving as acting governor
- Known for: Designing the Royal Engineers Museum, Gillingham, Kent

Colonel Edward Crozier Sibbald Moore, R.E. (c.1844 – 1904) was an author, architect and army officer. He wrote the book Sanitary Engineering, which discusses the principles of public health and sanitation of the late nineteenth century. Moore also commanded the Royal Engineers in Bermuda, serving as acting governor on several occasions, and designed the Royal Engineers Museum, Gillingham, Kent.

== Early life and family ==
Colonel Moore was born around 1844 and baptised in Plymouth, Devon. He was the eldest son of Thomas Edward Laws Moore, a polar explorer and Governor of the Falkland Islands, and his wife, Emma Jane Taplen.

== Career and legacy ==
Moore joined the army as a lieutenant on 17 April 1866, was promoted to captain on 31 December 1878, to major on 17 April 1886, and to the rank of lieutenant-colonel on 23 November 1892. He was an instructor at the school of Military Engineering between 1890 and 1893. He then went on to command the Royal Engineers in Bermuda, serving as acting governor on three occasions up until 1897. He received the brevet rank of colonel on 23 November 1896, before he formally resigned from the army. He was subsequently promoted to the substantive rank of colonel on Retired Pay on 18 October 1902.

In 1898, he wrote Sanitary Engineering: A Practical Treatise on the Collection, Removal, and Final Disposal of Sewage, and the Design and Construction of Works of Drainage and Sewage, etc.. He was one of the first engineers to "recognise the possibilities of the new methods of purification of that day", his book went on to become one of the key works in the field.

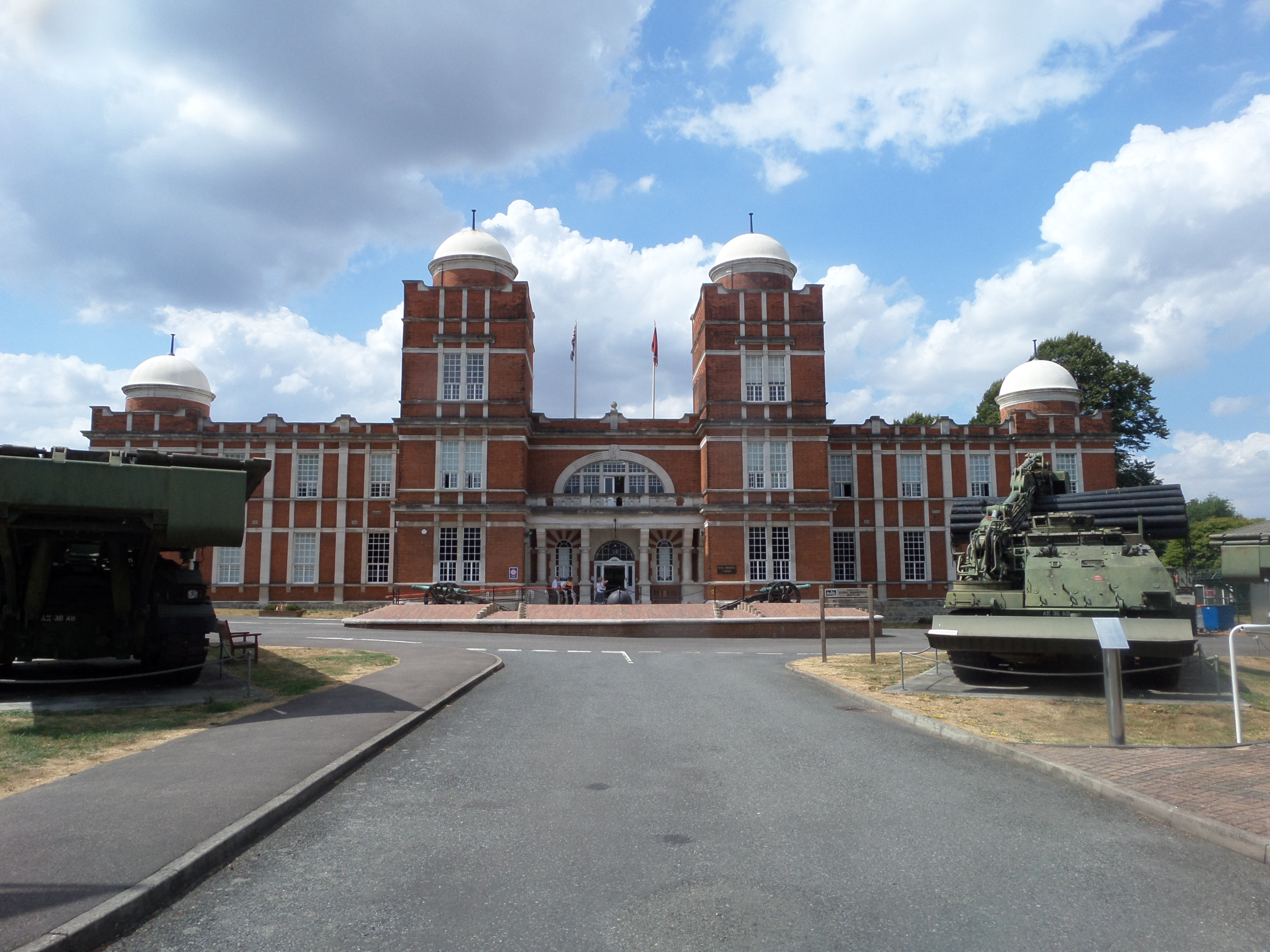
The Royal Engineers Museum, designed by Moore, c.1905

In his final years, he designed the Ravelin Building, Gillingham, Kent, to serve as the Electrical Engineering School for the Corps. The building's construction, which cost £40,000, represented a major investment in technical training for the Corps. However, he died in 1904 and never witnessed its construction and opening. The building became the Royal Engineers Museum.
