= Kate Smith (diplomat) =

British diplomat

Kate Smith CMG
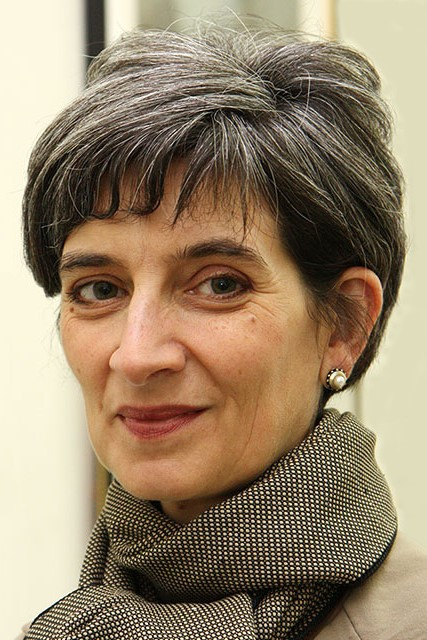

British Ambassador to Greece
- In office January 2017 – July 2021
- Monarch: Elizabeth II
- Prime Minister: Theresa May; Boris Johnson
- Preceded by: John Kittmer
- Succeeded by: Matthew Lodge

Personal details
- Born: Katherine Lucy Smith

Katherine Lucy Smith CMG is a British diplomat who served as British Ambassador to Greece from January 2017 until July 2021.

Smith joined the Foreign and Commonwealth Office in 1987, serving in Lusaka and then in London in the Central African Department. She then did a tour in Athens in 1991, and then in the Counter-Proliferation Department focusing on Chemical and Biological Weapons. Later she served at the UN in New York and on security postings in London before becoming Deputy Head of Mission at the British Embassy in Tehran from 2005 to 2007. She was appointed a Companion of the Order of St Michael and St George (CMG) in the New Year's Honours for 2008.

On return from Tehran, Smith was seconded to Royal Dutch Shell where she served as international adviser from 2008 and then head of UK governmental relations from 2009 until 2012. She returned to the FCO as Director of the Americas. In 2017 she succeeded John Kittmer as Her Majesty's Ambassador to the Hellenic Republic. In 2021 she was in turn succeeded in Greece by Matthew Lodge.

Diplomatic posts
Preceded by John Kittmer	British Ambassador to Greece; 2017–2021	Succeeded by Matthew Lodge (diplomat)
