= Commissioner for the British Indian Ocean Territory =

Head of government

The commissioner for the British Indian Ocean Territory is the head of government in the United Kingdom's overseas territory of the British Indian Ocean Territory. The commissioner is appointed by the British monarch on the advice of the Foreign and Commonwealth Office. The commissioner does not reside in the territory, as it has had no native population since the forced depopulation of the Chagossian people in the 1970s, and the only population is the military of the United States and the United Kingdom at the joint base at Diego Garcia.

The commissioner's role is to administer the territory on behalf of the British government. This involves the passing of any necessary legislation for the territory, usually orders in council or statutory instruments. The commissioner is also responsible for liaising with the military of the United States in matters concerning the territory. An administrator for the British Indian Ocean Territory acts as the commissioner's assistant. The commissioner also appoints a representative on the territory, who is the senior British military officer at Diego Garcia.

== List of commissioners ==
- 1965–1967: The Earl of Oxford and Asquith
- 1967–1969: Sir Hugh Selby Norman-Walker
- 1969–1973: Sir Bruce Greatbatch
- 1973–1976: Colin Hamilton Allan
- 1976: Norman Aspin
- 1976–1979: Philip Robert Aked Mansfield
- 1979–1982: John Adam Robson
- 1982–1985: William Nigel Wenban-Smith
- 1985–1988: William Marsden
- 1988–1991: Richard John Smale Edis
- 1991–1994: Thomas George Harris
- 1994–1996: David Ross MacLennan
- 1996–1998: Bruce Harry Dinwiddy
- 1998: Christopher Edward John Wilton
- 1998–2001: Charles John Branford White
- 2001–2004: Alan Edden Huckle
- 2004–2006: Anthony Campbell Crombie
- 2006–2008: Robert Leigh Turner
- 2008–2012: Colin Roberts
- 2012–2016: Peter Hayes
- 2016–2017: John Kittmer
- 2017–2021: Benjamin Robert Merrick
- 2021–2024: Paul Candler
- 2024–present: Nishi Dholakia
