= Matthew Lodge (diplomat) =

British diplomat

His Excellency Matthew Lodge
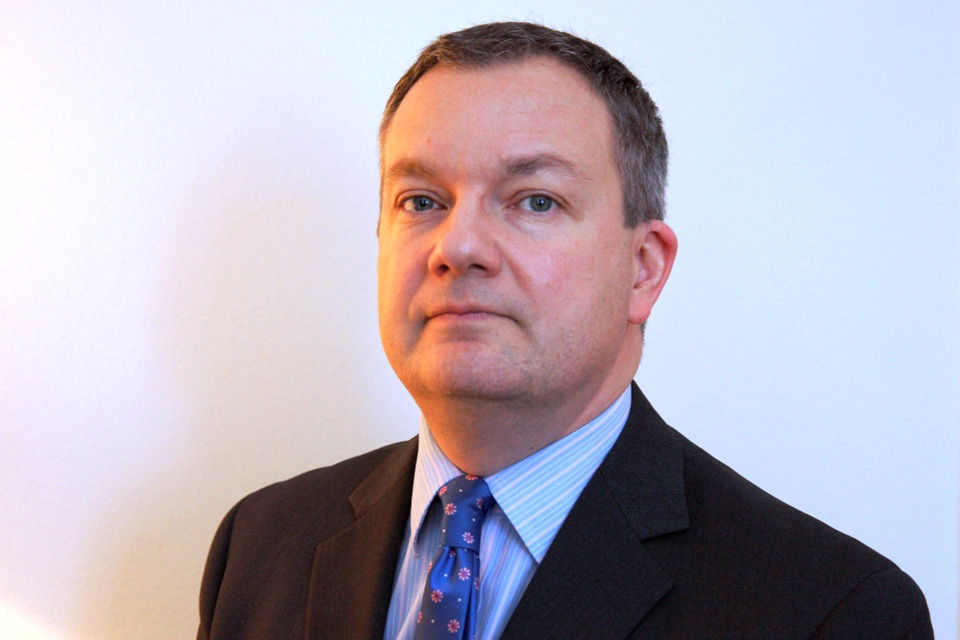
- Lodge in 2013

British Ambassador to Greece
- In office September 2021 – September 2026
- Monarchs: Elizabeth II; Charles III
- Prime Minister: Boris Johnson; Liz Truss; Rishi Sunak; Keir Starmer; Andy Burnham
- Preceded by: Kate Smith
- Succeeded by: Stephen Lillie

British Ambassador to Kuwait
- In office 2014–2017
- Monarch: Elizabeth II
- Prime Minister: David Cameron; Theresa May
- Preceded by: Frank Baker
- Succeeded by: Michael Davenport

British Ambassador to Finland
- In office 2010–2013
- Monarch: Elizabeth II
- Prime Minister: David Cameron
- Preceded by: Valerie Caton
- Succeeded by: Sarah Price

Personal details
- Born: Matthew James Lodge; 3 June 1968 (age 58)
- Education: University of Birmingham (BA)

Matthew James Lodge (born 3 June 1968) is a British diplomat. He served as Ambassador to Greece (2021–2026), Ambassador to Finland (2010–2013) and Ambassador to Kuwait (2014–2017).

== Early life and education ==
Lodge was born on 3 June 1968 in Crosby, Lancashire, England. He was educated at Abingdon School, a private school in Oxfordshire.

=== Military service ===
On 10 September 1986, Lodge was commissioned in the Royal Marines as a second lieutenant, with seniority in that rank from 1 September 1986. Having been awarded a university cadetship, he studied modern languages (French and Russian) at the University of Birmingham, graduating with a Bachelor of Arts (BA Hons) degree. He reached the rank of lieutenant, before retiring from the Royal Marines on 4 May 1996 after ten years of service.

== Diplomatic career ==
Lodge joined the Foreign and Commonwealth Office (FCO) in 1996. His early appointments were initially focused on the Balkans and the Eastern Mediterranean. He was private secretary to the Permanent Under-Secretary of State for Foreign Affairs from 2004 to 2007. He was deputy head of mission at the British Embassy in Baghdad, Iraq in 2007, and then attended the Higher Command and Staff Course in 2008.

From 2008 to 2010, Lodge was head of the Afghanistan Group in the FCO. He served as Her Majesty's Ambassador to Finland from 2010 to 2013, and Her Majesty's Ambassador to the State of Kuwait from 2014 to 2017. In 2017, he was made a minister at the British Embassy in Paris, in addition to serving as ambassador and permanent delegate to the United Nations Educational, Scientific and Cultural Organization (UNESCO). He was promoted to deputy head of mission in 2020. In December 2020, it was announced that he would be the next British Ambassador to Greece. He presented his credentials to Katerina Sakellaropoulou, President of the Hellenic Republic, on 22 September 2021.

== See also ==
- List of Old Abingdonians
