= Cosmo Haskard =

Irish-born British colonial administrator and retired British Army officer

Sir Cosmo Haskard KCMG MBE

Governor of the Falkland Islands
- In office 1964–1970
- Monarch: Elizabeth II
- Preceded by: Edwin Porter Arrowsmith
- Succeeded by: Ernest Gordon Lewis

Personal details
- Born: Cosmo Dugal Patrick Thomas Haskard; 25 November 1916 Dublin, Ireland
- Died: 21 February 2017 (aged 100) Bantry Bay, County Cork, Ireland
- Spouse: Phillada Stanley
- Military career
- Branch: British Army
- Service years: 1938–1966
- Rank: Major
- Unit: Royal Irish Fusiliers
- Conflicts: Second World War
- Awards: Member of the Order of the British Empire (MBE)

Sir Cosmo Dugal Patrick Thomas Haskard KCMG MBE (25 November 1916 – 21 February 2017) was an Irish-born British colonial administrator and British Army officer. As Governor of the Falkland Islands from 1964 to 1970, he played a key role in defeating plans by Harold Wilson's Labour government to cede the sovereignty of the islands to Argentina. He turned 100 in November 2016 and died on 21 February 2017.

== Life and career ==
Born in Dublin, he was the son of Brigadier-General John McDougal and Alicia "Lily" Haskard. He was educated at Cheltenham College and the Royal Military College, Sandhurst. He passed second out of Sandhurst but failed the medical examination to enter the Army. Instead, he read modern languages at Pembroke College, Cambridge. At Cambridge, he served in the university's Officer Training Corps, attaining the rank of cadet company sergeant major; he was commissioned a second lieutenant for service with the infantry unit of the Cambridge OTC contingent on 1 October 1938.

Haskard was commissioned a second lieutenant in the Royal Irish Fusiliers on 1 November 1939, attaining the rank of captain (war-substantive) by the end of the Second World War. He was appointed a Member of the Order of the British Empire, Military Division (MBE) in September 1945.

Haskard was promoted to the substantive rank of captain on 1 January 1949, with the honorary rank of major. He relinquished his reserve commission on 25 November 1966, retaining the honorary rank of major.

Haskard served as Governor of the Falkland Islands from 1964 to 1970. As governor, he was instrumental in defeating a move by Harold Wilson's government to cede sovereignty of the islands to Argentina.

He was appointed KCMG in the 1965 New Year Honours.
