= Philip Mansfield =

British diplomat (1926–2003)

Sir Philip Robert Aked Mansfield, KCMG (9 May 1926 – 14 May 2003) was a British diplomat.

== Biography ==
Mansfield was born in Harrogate, the son of Philip Theodore Mansfield, CSI, CIE and Helen Rosamond Aked. He was educated at Winchester College and Pembroke College, Cambridge, where he graduated BA in 1949. From 1944 to 1947 he served in the Grenadier Guards.

Mansfield joined the Sudan Political Service in 1950. In 1955, he joined HM Diplomatic Service, and was posted to Addis Ababa, Singapore, Paris, and Buenos Aires. An Africa specialist, he was Head of the Rhodesia Department of the Foreign and Commonwealth Office from 1969 to 1972. After attending the Royal College of Defence Studies in 1973, Mansfield was posted to Nairobi as Counsellor and Head of Chancery of the British High Commission in 1974, and was promoted to Deputy High Commissioner in 1976. From 1976 to 1979, he was Assistant Under-Secretary of State, with overall responsibility for African affairs; he was concurrently Commissioner for the British Indian Ocean Territory.

From 1979 to 1981, Mansfield was Deputy British Representative to the United Nations in New York. His final posting was as British Ambassador to the Netherlands from 1981 to 1984.

Mansfield was appointed CMG in 1973 and KCMG in 1984.

== Family ==
In 1953, Mansfield married Elinor Russell MacHatton, an anthropologist he met in the Sudan; they had two sons.
