= Edwin Arrowsmith =

British colonial administrator (1909–1992)

Sir Edwin Arrowsmith KCMG
- Arrowsmith in September 1962.

Governor of the Falkland Islands
- In office 1957-1964
- Monarch: Elizabeth II
- Preceded by: Oswald Raynor Arthur
- Succeeded by: Cosmo Haskard

High Commissioner for the British Antarctic Territory
- In office 1962–1964
- Preceded by: Inaugural holder
- Succeeded by: Cosmo Haskard

Personal details
- Born: Edwin Porter Arrowsmith; 23 May 1909
- Died: 10 July 1992 (aged 83)
- Education: Cheltenham College and Trinity College, Oxford

Sir Edwin Porter Arrowsmith KCMG (23 May 1909 – 10 July 1992) was a British colonial administrator.

He was Commissioner of the Turks and Caicos from 1940 to 1946, Administrator of Dominica from 1946 to 1952, Resident Commissioner, Basutoland from 1952 to 1956, Governor of the Falkland Islands from 1957 to 1964 and concurrently High Commissioner for the British Antarctic Territory from 1962 to 1964.

He was appointed a Commander of the Order of St Michael and St George (CMG) in the 1950 Birthday Honours and a Knight Commander of the Order (KCMG) in the 1959 Birthday Honours.
