= Phlomis tathamiorum =

Scientific classification
- Kingdom: Plantae
- Clade: Tracheophytes
- Clade: Angiosperms
- Clade: Eudicots
- Clade: Asterids
- Order: Lamiales
- Family: Lamiaceae
- Genus: Phlomis
- Species: P. tathamiorum

Binomial name
- Phlomis tathamiorum R.M.Haber & Semaan

Species of flowering plant

Phlomis tathamiorum is a plant species endemic to a small area near the town of Ehden in northern Lebanon. It grows in rocky mountain pastures at elevations of 1400–1700 m. The plant is under threat due to proposed development of the land for other purposes.

Phlomis tathamiorum is a perennial herb with a wooden base. Stem is square in cross-section, up to 110 cm tall. Basal leaves are up to 13 cm long, stem leaf blades up to 10 cm long. Flowers are yellow, born in clumps along the upper stem.

Phlomis tathamiorum is named after former British ambassador to Lebanon David Tatham, "for voicing the imminence for caring for Lebanon's nature through his activity in Lebanon, and for assisting the authors at starting work for seed banking of Lebanon's natural beauties at Kew Gardens as well as collaborating with England's National Trust to help create a similar entity for Lebanon."
