= Peter Hayes (diplomat) =

British diplomat (born 1963)

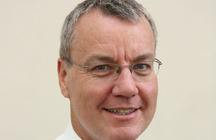
Peter Hayes

Peter Richard Hayes (born 11 April 1963) is a British diplomat. He was formerly the Commissioner of the British Indian Ocean Territory and the British Antarctic Territory.

== Early life ==
He was educated at the University of Surrey (BSc, Physics) and King's College London (PhD, 1989).

== Career ==
Originally trained as a physicist, in 1990 Hayes joined the Civil Service in the National Physical Laboratory, later working in the Department of Trade and Industry, the Cabinet Office, the Office of Science and Technology, and the Foreign and Commonwealth Office. He worked for the British Embassy to the United States as a Counsellor for 2001–2005.

In 2005 Hayes was appointed Principal Private Secretary to the Foreign Secretary, serving under Jack Straw, Margaret Beckett and David Miliband until 2007. From 2008 to 2010 Hayes was the British High Commissioner to Sri Lanka, and concurrently the non-resident High Commissioner to the Maldives. He then went on secondment to the London Stock Exchange as their Head of Public Affairs.

From 2012 to 2016, he was Commissioner for the British Indian Ocean Territory and the British Antarctic Territory.

== Personal life ==
In 2002, Hayes married Kirsty Hayes, a fellow diplomat. They have two children.

== Offices held ==
Diplomatic posts
Preceded by Sir Geoffrey Adams	Principal Private Secretary to the Foreign Secretary; 2005–2006	Succeeded by Matthew Gould
Preceded by Dominick Chilcott	British High Commissioner to Sri Lanka; 2008–2010	Succeeded by John Rankin
Preceded by Dominick Chilcott	British High Commissioner to the Maldives (non-resident); 2008–2010	Succeeded by John Rankin
Preceded by Colin Roberts	Commissioner for the British Indian Ocean Territory and the British Antarctic Territory; 2012–2016	Succeeded by John Kittmer
