= List of ambassadors of the United Kingdom to Lithuania =

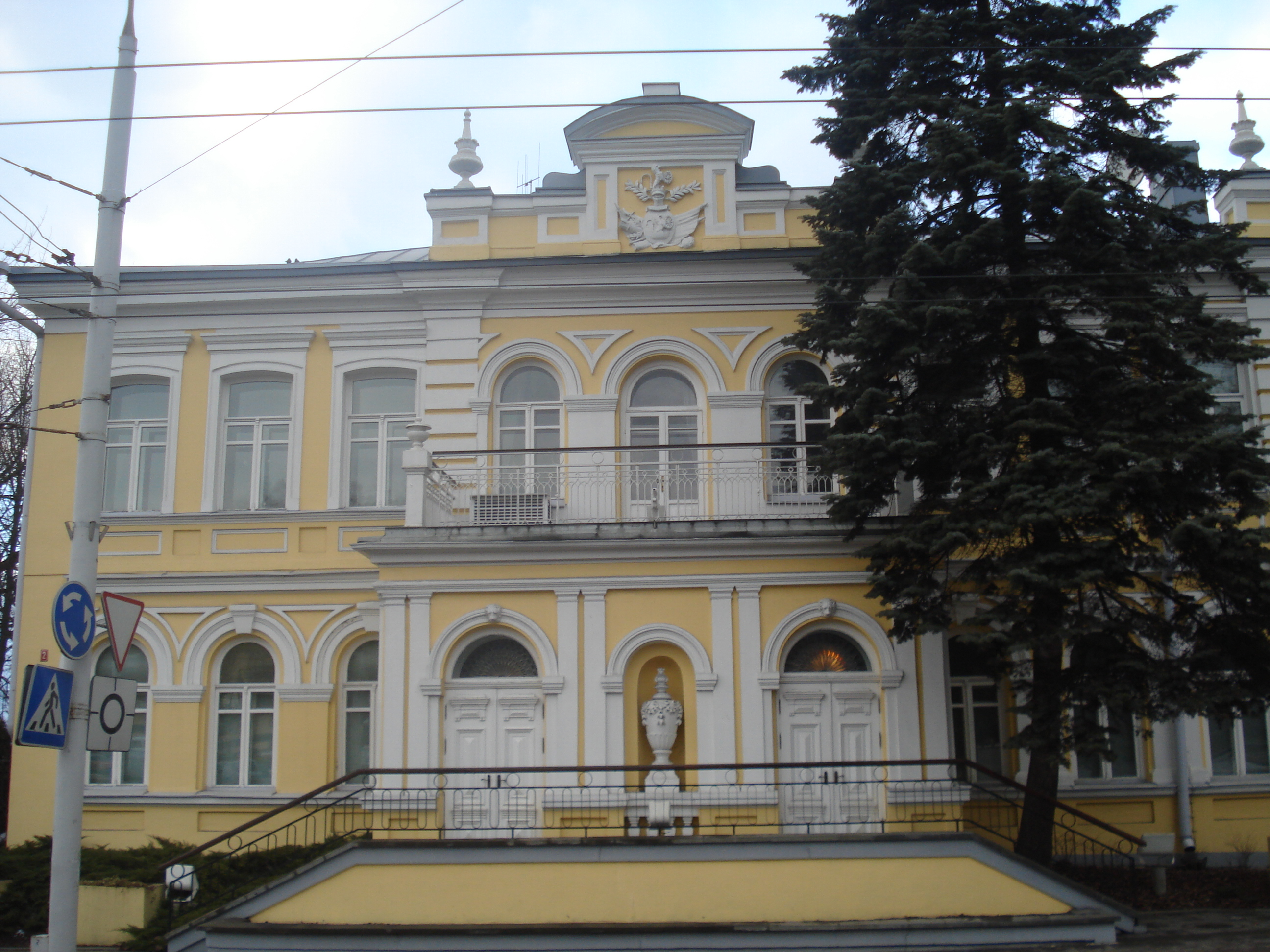
The British Embassy in Vilnius

The ambassador of the United Kingdom to Lithuania is the United Kingdom's foremost diplomatic representative in the Republic of Lithuania, and in charge of the UK's diplomatic mission in Vilnius.

== Heads of mission ==
=== Envoys extraordinary and ministers plenipotentiary ===
From 1921 to 1940, British ministers were accredited to Estonia and Latvia as well as Lithuania; they were based in Riga.

- 1921–1922: Ernest Wilton
- 1922–1927: Sir Tudor Vaughan
- 1928–1930: Joseph Addison
- 1931–1934: Hughe Knatchbull-Hugessen
- 1934–1937: Sir Edmund Monson, 3rd Baronet
- 1937–1940: Sir Charles Orde

No representation 1940–91. Lithuania was incorporated into the Soviet Union in 1940, and regained its independence in 1991.

=== Ambassadors ===
- 1991–1994: Michael Peart
- 1995–1998: Tom Macan
- 1998–2001: Christopher Robbins
- 2001–2003: Jeremy Hill
- 2004–2008: Colin Roberts
- 2007–2011: Simon Butt
- 2011–2015: David Hunt
- 2015–2019: Claire Lawrence
- 2019–September 2024: Brian Olley
- From September 2024: Liz Boyles
