= Simon Butt =

British diplomat

British Ambassador to Lithuania
- In office 2008–2011
- Monarch: Elizabeth II
- Preceded by: Colin Roberts
- Succeeded by: David Hunt

Personal details
- Born: April 1958

Simon Butt (born April 1958) is a British diplomat, the former British Ambassador to Lithuania.

== Postings ==
From 1982 to 1984 Butt served as a political officer in the British embassy in Moscow, this was followed by two years assigned to Burma. From 1990 to 1994 he served in the External Relations Section of the UK Delegation to the EU based in Brussels. Butt was deputy head of mission at the British embassy in Kyiv from 1997 to 2000. From 2004 to 2007 he served as deputy high commissioner in Islamabad, Pakistan. On 7 May 2008 Butt received his first head of mission post as the British ambassador to Lithuania. He was succeeded as ambassador in 2011 by David Hunt.
