= Neville French =

British diplomat and colonial authority

Neville Arthur Irwin French, CMG, LVO (28 April 1920 – 21 April 1996) was Governor of the Falkland Islands and High Commissioner for the British Antarctic Territory from 1975 to 1977.
