= Falkland Islands Association =

UK-based organisation

The Falkland Islands Association (FIA) is a United Kingdom-based organisation, established 1968, that campaigns internationally for the self-determination of the people of the Falkland Islands.

Activities of the association include the monitoring of political activity and press comment relating to the Falklands and the lobbying of politicians and officials on matters relating to the islands. The association liaises with the Falkland Islands Government and their representative in London attends Executive Committee meetings of the association. The association maintains a representative presence in the Falkland Islands.

The FIA was instrumental in the establishment of the South Georgia Association.

== People ==
The chairman of the association since December 2018 has been John Duncan, a retired diplomat who had served as UK's ambassador for Arms Control and Disarmament at the United Nations from 2006 to 2011, acting governor of the Falkland Islands in 2014, and governor of the Virgin Islands from 2014 to 2017. A former chairman was Sir Rex Hunt, governor of the islands at the time of the 1982 invasion by Argentina.

The first patron of the association, until her death in 2013, was Margaret Thatcher. The current president is Lord Hurd of Westwell (Douglas Hurd).
