= Salvia fairuziana =

Scientific classification
- Kingdom: Plantae
- Clade: Tracheophytes
- Clade: Angiosperms
- Clade: Eudicots
- Clade: Asterids
- Order: Lamiales
- Family: Lamiaceae
- Genus: Salvia
- Species: S. fairuziana

Binomial name
- Salvia fairuziana R.M.Haber & Semaan

Species of flowering plant

Salvia fairuziana, commonly known as Fairuz's sage, is a species of flowering plant in the family Lamiaceae, endemic to the western slopes of Mount Lebanon in Lebanon. It was formally described as a new species in 2004 by Lebanese botanists Ricardus Haber and Myrna Semaan. The plant is a perennial herb characterized by its lilac-violet flowers and its specific habitat among calcareous rocks in Mediterranean red soil. The species is named in honour of the renowned Lebanese singer Fairuz.

== Taxonomy and etymology ==
Salvia fairuziana was first described by Ricardus M. Haber and Myrna T. Semaan in the journal Novon in 2004. The specific epithet fairuziana honors the celebrated Lebanese singer Fairuz, whom the authors described as a national symbol of Lebanon, embodying beauty, patriotism, and respect for nature.

== Description ==
Salvia fairuziana is a perennial herb that grows to a height of 50–80 cm (20–31 in). Its stems are covered with dense tuberculate trichomes. The basal leaves are notably large, measuring between 15 and 18.5 cm (5.9 and 7.3 in) in length and 6 to 8 m (20 to 26 ft) in width. They are broadly ovate to elliptic, with a cordate base, shallowly lobed margins, and a verrucose (warty) surface. The floral bracts are distinctive, being reddish-brown (ferric red), succulent, ovate, and verrucose at their periphery, ranging from 1.0–2.6 cm (0.39–1.02 in) in length. The plant produces crowded verticillasters, each bearing 2 to 6 lilac-violet flowers. The corolla measures 2.4–2.7 cm (0.94–1.06 in) long, with an emarginate upper lip and a prominent lower lip. The flowering period for Salvia fairuziana is typically from May to June.

Salvia fairuziana shares morphological similarities with other Salvia species, such as S. hierosolymitana, S. sclarea, S. indica, S. chrysophylla, and S. argentea, particularly in its staminal structure and corolla tube. However, it can be distinguished from S. sclarea by its green bracts (as opposed to pink-mauve) and from S. hierosolymitana by its perennial habit, larger leaves, and specific bract morphology.

== Distribution and habitat ==
Salvia fairuziana is endemic to Lebanon, specifically found on the western slopes of Mount Lebanon. The type locality is identified as Kfour village in the Kesrouan Province, where it grows at an altitude of 755 and 820 m (2,477 and 2,690 ft) above sea level. The species thrives in habitats characterized by calcareous rocks and Mediterranean red soil (terra rossa), typically within open Quercus coccifera (Kermes oak) scrub or woodlands. A population of only a few hundred specimens was observed at the type locality at the time of its description.

== Conservation status ==
Threats to its survival include primarily habitat loss resulting from urban sprawl, encroaching development, and the neglect of traditional agricultural terraces in its native range.
