= Oswald Raynor Arthur =

British colonial administrator

Sir Raynor Arthur KCMG CVO
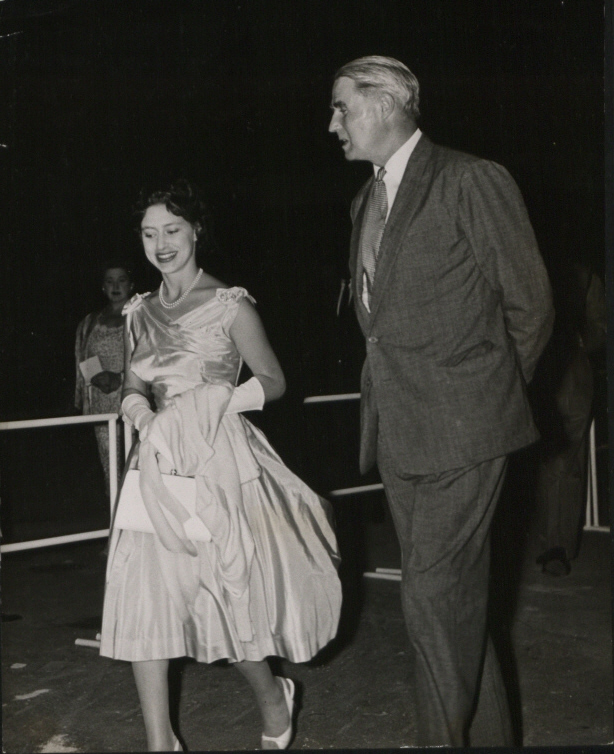
- Sir Raynor Arthur welcomed Her Royal Highness Princess Margaret when she made a brief visit to Nassau in May 1958
- Born: Oswald Raynor Arthur; 16 December 1905; Poona, Maharashtra, India
- Died: 4 December 1973 (aged 67)
- Education: Corpus Christi College, Cambridge
- Occupation: Colonial administrator

Sir Oswald Raynor Arthur KCMG CVO (16 December 1905 – 4 December 1973) was a British diplomat and colonial administrator.

== Early life and education ==
Arthur was born in Poona, the son of Sigismund Raynor Arthur (in the Indian Civil Service, grandson of Sir George Arthur, 1st Baronet) and Constance Hobhouse (daughter of Sir Charles Parry Hobhouse, 3rd Baronet).

He was educated at Charterhouse School and Corpus Christi College, Cambridge.

== Career ==
Arthur joined the Nigerian Political Service in 1928 as an administrative officer.

He transferred to the British administration in Cyprus in 1937, becoming the island's Chief Commissioner in 1948.

He then moved on to the Americas and became Colonial Secretary of Bermuda 1951–54; Governor of the Falkland Islands 1954–57; and Governor of the Bahamas until 1960.

== Personal life ==
On 8 May 1935 he married his cousin Mary Elizabeth Spring Rice, the only daughter of Sir Cecil Spring Rice, with whom he had two children.

== Honours and awards ==
Arthur was appointed CMG and CVO in 1953 and knighted KCMG in the New Year Honours of 1957. He was made a knight of the Order of St John of Jerusalem in 1954.

He was a justice of the peace in East Sussex in 1962.

Government offices
| Preceded by Sir Geoffrey Clifford | Governor of the Falkland Islands; 1954–1957 | Succeeded by Sir Edwin Arrowsmith |
| Preceded by The Earl of Ranfurly | Governor of the Bahamas; 1957–1960 | Succeeded by Sir Robert de Stapeldon |
