= Royal Engineers Museum =

The Royal Engineers Museum

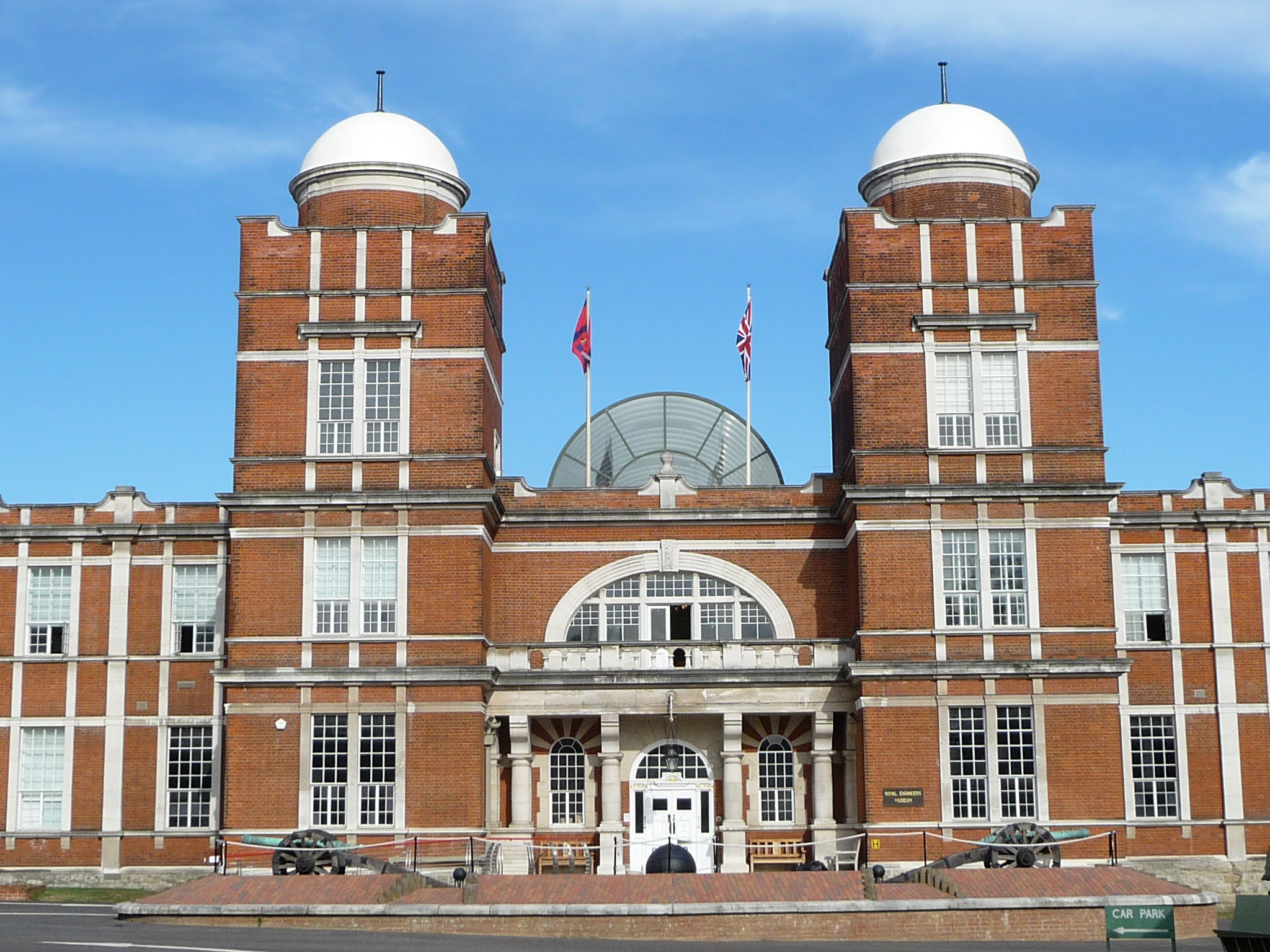
- The Royal Engineers Museum

- Shown in Kent
- Established: 1987
- Location: Gillingham, Kent
- Coordinates: 51.3921°N 0.5383°E
- Type: Military Museum
- Founder: General Sir Charles William Pasley
- CEO: Rebecca Nash
- Architect: Major E.C.S. Moore
- Owner: The Institution of Royal Engineers (InstRE)
- Website: www.re-museum.co.uk

Listed Building – Grade II
- Official name: Royal Engineers Museum, Brompton Barracks
- Designated: 05 December 1996
- Reference no.: 1259646

The Royal Engineers Museum is a military engineering museum and library in Gillingham, Kent, England. It tells the story of the Corps of Royal Engineers and British military engineering in general.

== History ==
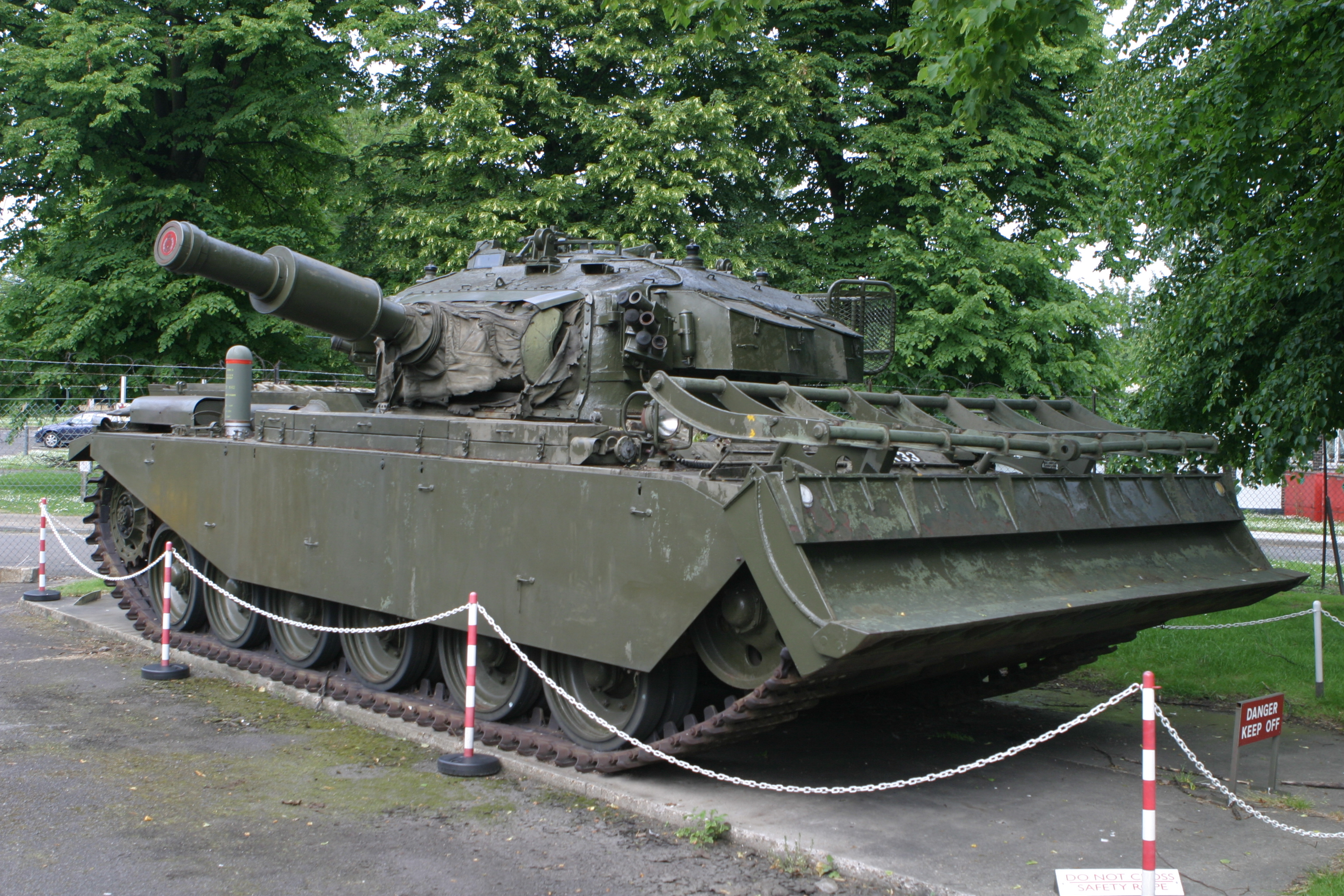
Centurion AVRE (Armoured Vehicle Royal Engineers)

The museum is housed in the former Ravelin Building at Brompton Barracks, Gillingham. This site has been central to the Corps’ history since 1812 when Colonel Pasley’s School of Military Engineering was established at Chatham. The Corps’ Library followed in 1813 (still extant), and the Ravelin Building itself was erected in 1905 as an electrical engineers’ training school. It was designed by Captain (later Major) E.C.S. Moore, RE, and opened in 1905 at a construction cost of £40,000. In 1987 the Ravelin was converted into the Corps’ museum; Queen Elizabeth II formally opened the Royal Engineers Museum in May 1987.

== Collections ==
The museum and library hold over 500,000 objects relating to the history of the Corps of Royal Engineers and the development of military engineering. It also has a collection of paintings and a large collection of medals including 25 Victoria Crosses. Other items include a German V-2 rocket used during the Second World War, the map used by the Duke of Wellington during the Battle of Waterloo, a finial from the Mahdi's tomb, weapons used by Lieutenant John Chard during the Anglo-Zulu War, a collection of bridge-laying tanks, a Brennan torpedo and a Harrier jump jet.

This exhibits can be grouped as follows:

- Engineering equipment and vehicles: artillery, bridging gear (Bailey bridges, pontoons, assault boats), armoured engineering vehicles, railway and water transport models. Many full‐size vehicles and prototypes are on display indoors and outdoors.
- Weapons and explosives: bombs, mines, torpedoes, demolition charges and flamethrowers.
- Communications and surveying: telegraph and radio sets, semaphore signalling gear, surveying instruments and historical maps.
- Photography and aerial: early aerial cameras and photographs (the Royal Engineers were pioneers of military ballooning)
- Bridging models (Bridge Study Centre): hundreds of scale models illustrating bridge designs from the 19th century onward, plus drawing sets and treatises.
- Fine art and photography: period paintings and drawings of engineering projects, plus extensive photography albums documenting Royal Engineers units and works.
- Medals and awards: one of the largest public collections of medals in the UK.

== See also ==
- Waterbeach Military Heritage Museum
- Royal Engineers
- Chatham Dockyard
- Imperial War Museum
- Museum of Army Flying
- List of museums in Kent
- Royal Military Academy Sandhurst
- Sapper
