= Colin Roberts (diplomat) =

British diplomat and Governor of the Falkland Islands

His Excellency Colin Roberts CVO
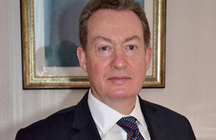

Governor of the Falkland Islands Commissioner for South Georgia and the South Sandwich Islands
- In office 29 April 2014 – 12 September 2017
- Monarch: Elizabeth II
- Chief Executive: Keith Padgett; Barry Rowland
- Preceded by: Nigel Haywood
- Succeeded by: Nigel Phillips

Commissioner of the British Indian Ocean Territory and the British Antarctic Territory
- In office 23 June 2008 – 17 October 2012
- Monarch: Elizabeth II
- Preceded by: Leigh Turner
- Succeeded by: Peter Hayes

British Ambassador to Lithuania
- In office 2004–2008
- Monarch: Elizabeth II
- Preceded by: Jeremy Hill
- Succeeded by: Simon Butt

Personal details
- Born: 31 July 1959 (age 66)
- Spouse: Camilla
- Children: Oliver (b. 2002), Alexander (b.2004)

Colin Roberts CVO (born 31 July 1959) is a British diplomat and the former Governor of the Falkland Islands and former Commissioner of the South Georgia and the South Sandwich Islands.

== Biography ==
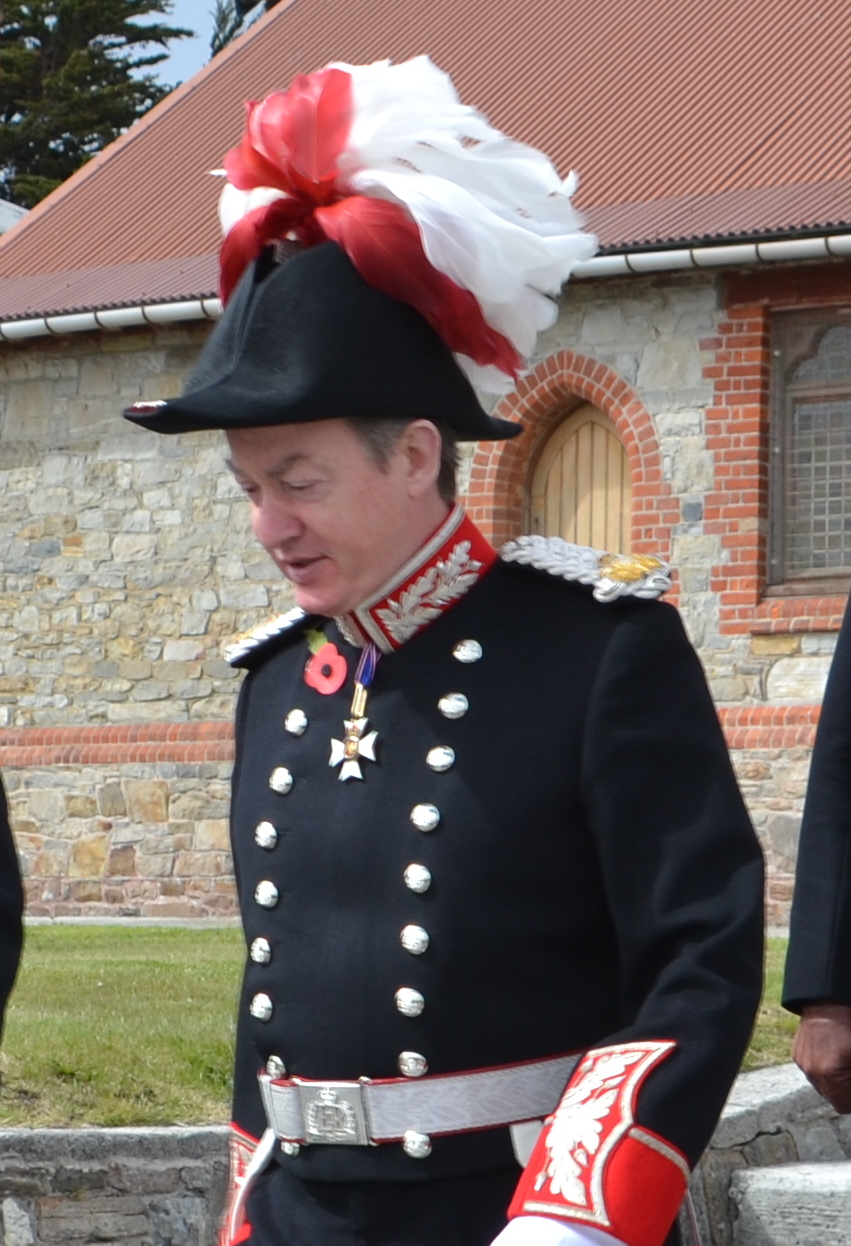
Roberts as Governor of the Falkland Islands in 2016

Roberts was born on 31 July 1959. He was educated at Winchester College, then an all-boys independent boarding school in Winchester, Hampshire. He studied English literature at King's College, Cambridge, graduating with a Bachelor of Arts (BA) degree: as per tradition, his BA was promoted to a Master of Arts (MA Cantab) degree. He then studied at The Courtauld Institute of Art, completing a Master of Philosophy (MPhil) degree in 1982.

He previously served as British Ambassador to Lithuania, from 2004 to 2008, Commissioner of the British Indian Ocean Territory and the British Antarctic Territory from 2008 to 2012 and Director of the FCO Eastern Europe and Central Asia Directorate from 2012 to 2014. Roberts also held diplomatic service posts in Japan and France.

In April 2010, Roberts, acting on the instructions of David Miliband—established a marine nature reserve around the Chagos Islands known as the Chagos Marine Protected Area. The designation proved controversial as the decision was announced during a period when the UK Parliament was in recess. Later, in 2015, the Permanent Court of Arbitration held that the establishment of the marine protected area was illegal under the United Nations Convention on the Law of the Sea, as Mauritius had legally binding rights to fish in the waters surrounding the Chagos Archipelago, plus other rights.<

In December 2012 it was announced that Roberts had been appointed Governor of the Falkland Islands and Commissioner for South Georgia and the South Sandwich Islands, to take up office in April 2014. Alicia Castro, Argentina's ambassador to the United Kingdom, criticised Roberts's appointment as a "provocation" and said he was "not the person to encourage dialogue between nations".

In June 2017 the Foreign and Commonwealth Office announced that Roberts would be leaving the Falklands, to be replaced as Governor and Commissioner by Nigel Phillips in September 2017.
