= Miles Clifford =

Sir Geoffrey Miles Clifford, KBE, CMG, ED (16 February 1897 – 21 February 1986) was the Governor of the Falkland Islands from 1946 to 1954.

== Life ==
Clifford served in the British Army in World War I, and then in the Colonial Service in Nigeria. In World War II, he with Imbert Bourdillon, son of Bernard Bourdillon, assisted Philippe Leclerc of the Free French forces in his operation of August 1940 against Douala. He was later awarded the Resistance Medal with rosette.
