= Gordon Jewkes =

British colonial administrator and diplomat

Sir Gordon Wesley Jewkes KCMG (born 18 November 1931) is a British retired colonial administrator and diplomat. Jewkes joined the Inland Revenue at the age of 16 and went on to carry out his National Service as an officer in the Royal Army Ordnance Corps. He served in various Whitehall departments but is most associated with the Foreign and Commonwealth Office. Jewkes served as the finance officer for the Diplomatic Service and Deputy High Commissioner in Trinidad and Tobago before becoming a consul and then consul-general in the United States. He was Governor of the Falkland Islands and High Commissioner for the British Antarctic Territory from 1985 to 1988. In retirement he has served as director of two private firms and on the council of the University of Buckingham.

== Early life and military service ==
Jewkes was born in County Durham in November 1931. After an education received in England and Scotland he joined, at the age of 16, the Inland Revenue. He spent the next 20 years in various Whitehall government departments, apart from two years of National Service spent with the British Army. He was commissioned as a second lieutenant in the Royal Army Ordnance Corps on 20 January 1951. He was granted the acting rank of lieutenant on 31 July 1952. Whilst in the Army Reserve he received promotion to the rank of lieutenant on 18 November 1954 and to captain on 18 November 1958.

== Diplomatic service ==
With the Foreign and Commonwealth Office he served as the finance officer for the Diplomatic Service and Deputy High Commissioner in Trinidad and Tobago. He was appointed consul to the United States, based at Chicago, on 10 December 1969. On 14 June 1979 Jewkes was appointed Consul-General to the United States at Cleveland. He was appointed a companion of the Order of St Michael and St George in the 1980 New Year Honours.

Jewkes served as Governor of the Falkland Islands and High Commissioner for the British Antarctic Territory from 1985 to 1988. Jewkes succeeded Sir Rex Hunt, who had been governor during the Argentine invasion of the Falkland Islands. Jewkes' appointment came after the fall of the National Reorganization Process junta and at a time when there were hopes for improved relations with the new Argentine government. Jewkes' last diplomatic posting was as Consul-General in New York and as Director-General of Trade and Investment USA. He was rewarded for service in this role by appointment as knight commander in the Order of St Michael and St George in the 1990 Birthday Honours.

== Retirement from public service ==
Jewkes was a director of Segro (a development company originally known the Slough Estates Group) from before 1992 to 14 May 2002. He was a director of Hogg Group and insurance and travel management company, now forming part of Aon, from 1 January 1992 to 31 August 1994. Jewkes served on the council of the University of Buckingham from 1996 to 2001 and was a member of the Marshall Aid Commemoration Commission.
