= Jane Rumble =

British geographer

Jane Rumble OBE FRGS
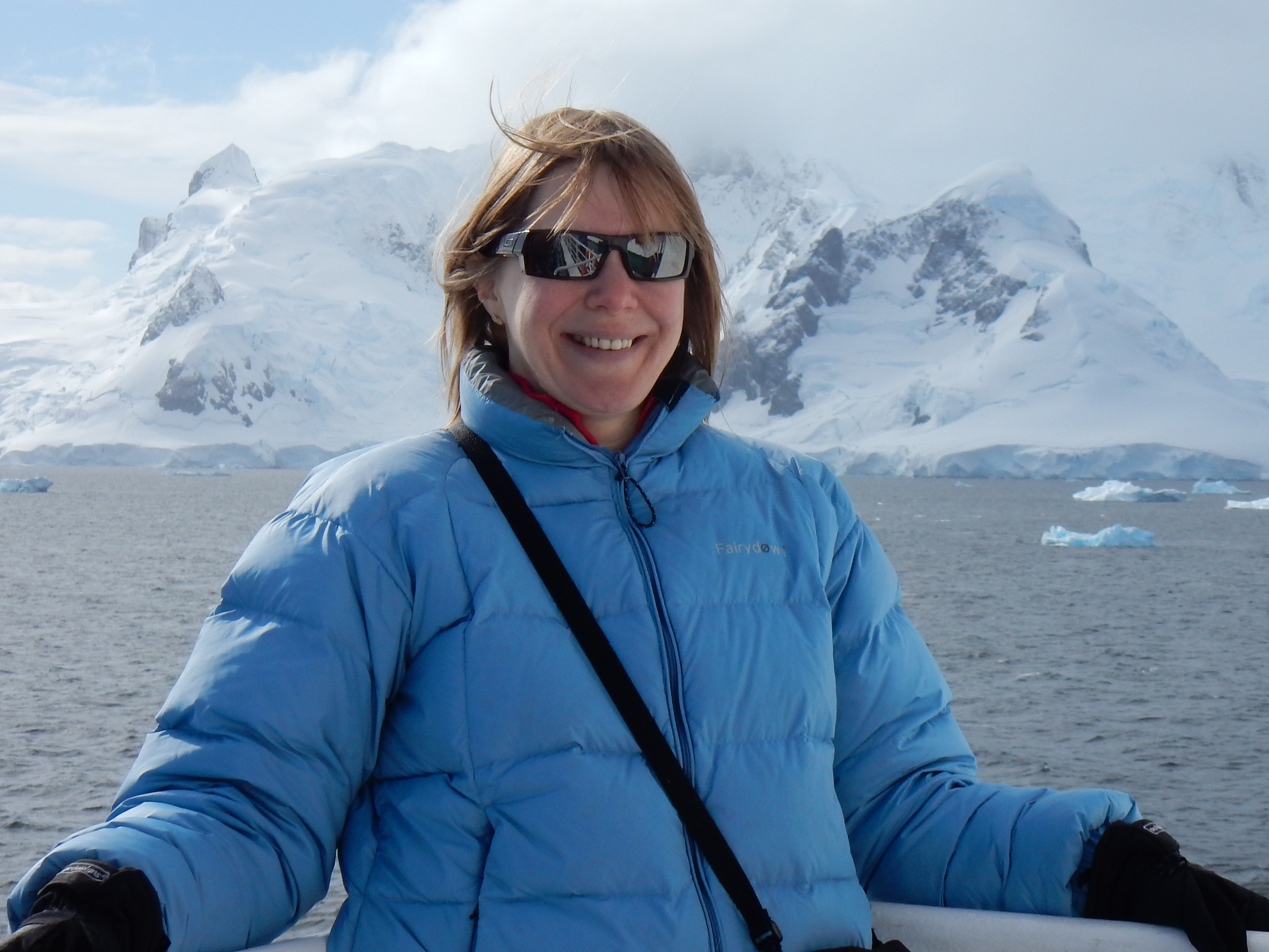
- Jane Rumble in 2016
- Education: University of Exeter
- Scientific career
- Workplaces: Polar Regions Department, Foreign and Commonwealth Office, UK

Jane Rumble OBE FRGS is the Head of the Polar Regions Department for the UK's Foreign and Commonwealth Office. She is also HM Commissioner of the British Antarctic Territory.

== Early life and education ==
Rumble graduated with a BSc degree in geography from the University of Exeter.

== Career and impact ==
Rumble was appointed to the position of Head of Polar Regions Department in January 2007, having been Deputy Head since 2003. She began her civil service career in the UK's Department of Environment, where she held a number of roles dealing with corporate and environmental policy, including policy on the health and safety of genetically modified crops. She then worked for the cross-Whitehall Teenage Pregnancy Unit before joining the Foreign and Commonwealth Office, where she began to work on polar policy. Rumble is the fourth Head of the FCDO's Polar Regions Department since 1943. During her time as Head of Polar Regions, she has been involved in shaping policy relevant to Arctic and Antarctic protection.

== Awards and honours ==
Rumble is a Fellow of the Royal Geographical Society (FRGS) and was awarded the Back Award in 2023. She is also a Policy Fellow at the Centre for Science and Policy of the University of Cambridge.

She was appointed as an Officer of the Order of the British Empire (OBE) in the 2018 Queen's Birthday Honours List. In July 2018 she was awarded an honorary DSc degree by Leeds University.
