= James Roland Walter Parker =

British overseas territory administrator (1919–2009)

James Roland Walter Parker CMG OBE (20 December 1919 – 17 November 2009) was the Governor of the Falkland Islands and High Commissioner for the British Antarctic Territory from 1976 to 1980.

== Life ==
He was the son of Alexander Roland Parker a member of the Incorporated Society of Musicians. In 1938, he began working at the Ministry of Labour. At the start of World War II he served in the 1st London Scottish from March to October 1940, during which time he lost the lower part of his left leg.

At the beginning of the Nigerian Civil War, in 1967, Parker was in Enugu as deputy to the British High Commissioner David Hunt. On good terms with C. Odumegwu Ojukwu, he evaluated the situation quite differently from Hunt, who placed the blame for the outbreak of hostilities on Ojukwu's ambition. In August of that year, Akanu Ibiam renounced his British knighthood in a letter to Parker.
