= Ernest Gordon Lewis =

Colonial administrator and diplomat

Ernest Gordon Lewis, CMG, OBE (26 September 1918 – 29 December 2006), commonly known as Toby Lewis, was a New Zealand-born British colonial administrator and diplomat. He was Governor of the Falkland Islands and High Commissioner for the British Antarctic Territory from 1971 to 1975.
