= Ben Merrick =

British civil servant

Benjamin Robert Merrick CMG is a British civil servant who was Director of Overseas Territories at the Foreign, Commonwealth and Development Office from August 2017 until July 2021.

== Career ==
He held the position of Commissioner of the British Antarctic Territory and Commissioner of the British Indian Ocean Territory, prior to that he was the deputy director of the Overseas Territories and was among the cabinet office of Ministry of Defence as Head of Arms Control and Counter Proliferation Policy from 2012 to 2015. He helped initiate the Anguilla Economic Resiliance Programme (AERP) with Ellis Lorenzo Webster to provide economic stability for Anguilla. He took a stance against Andrew Fahie, the Premier of the British Virgin Islands, saying that Fahie had decreased engagement from the British Virgin Islands and the United Kingdom, including cancellation of visits. He also said Fahie was making misleading statements that the UK was forcing the islands to hand over almost full control of the management of the territory's finances to the Recovery and Development Agency (RDA). Fahie later refuted these claims, calling Merrick's statements PR games and said that his government had been in contact with the UK and said Merrick's letter was an attempt to damage his reputation as Premier.

He also served as a member of the British Antarctic Territory directorate in the Foreign and Commonwealth Office. Since 2019 he has been deputy Disability Champion for the Civil Service. He was appointed Companion of the Order of St Michael and St George (CMG) in the 2022 New Year Honours for services to British foreign policy.

== Personal life ==
Merrick is legally blind.
