= British Antarctic Territory =

British Overseas Territory

- British Overseas Territory
- Flag Coat of arms
- Motto: "Research and Discovery"
- Anthem: "God Save the King"
- Location of the British Antarctic Territory in Antarctica
- Sovereign state claimant: United Kingdom
- First claim: 1908
- Capital and largest city: Rothera; 67°34′06″S 68°07′33″W
- Official languages: English
- Government: Dependency under a constitutional monarchy
  - Monarch: Charles III
  - Commissioner: Jane Rumble
  - Administrator: Natalie Allen
  - Attorney General: James Wood

Government of the United Kingdom
  - Minister: Uma Kumaran

Area
  - Total: 1,709,400 km^{2} (660,000 sq mi)
- Highest elevation: 3,239 m (10,627 ft)

Population
  - Summer estimate: 250
- Currency: Pound sterling (£) (GBP)
- Time zone: UTC-03:00
- UK postcode: BIQQ 1ZZ
- Internet TLD: .aq; .uk

The British Antarctic Territory (BAT) is a sector of Antarctica claimed by the United Kingdom as one of its 14 British Overseas Territories, of which it is by far the largest by area. It comprises the region south of 60°S latitude and between longitudes 20°W and 80°W, forming a wedge shape that extends to the South Pole, overlapped by the Antarctic claims of Argentina (Argentine Antarctica) and Chile (Chilean Antarctic Territory).

The territory is inhabited by the staff of research and support stations operated and maintained by the British Antarctic Survey and other organisations, and stations of Argentina, Chile and other countries. There are no native inhabitants. In 2012, the southern part of the territory was named Queen Elizabeth Land in honour of Queen Elizabeth II.

== History ==
The territory was formed on 3 March 1962, although the UK's claim to this portion of the Antarctic dates back to letters patent of 1908 and 1917. The area now covered by the Territory includes three regions which, before 1962, were administered by the British as separate dependencies of the Falkland Islands: Graham Land, the South Orkney Islands, and the South Shetland Islands.

The United Kingdom has had a continuous presence in the far South Atlantic since 1833 when it reasserted sovereignty over the Falkland Islands. In 1908, the UK extended its territorial claim by declaring sovereignty over "South Georgia, the South Orkneys, the South Shetlands, the Sandwich Islands, and Graham's Land, situated in the South Atlantic Ocean and on the Antarctic continent to the south of the 50th parallel of south latitude, and lying between the 20th and the 80th degrees of west longitude". All these territories were administered as Falkland Islands Dependencies from Stanley by the Governor of the Falkland Islands.

In 1917, the wording of the claim was modified, so as to, among other things, unambiguously include all the territory in the sector stretching to the South Pole (thus encompassing all of the present-day British Antarctic Territory). The new claim covered "all islands and territories whatsoever between the 20th degree of west longitude and the 50th degree of west longitude which are situated south of the 50th parallel of south latitude; and all islands and territories whatsoever between the 50th degree of west longitude and the 80th degree of west longitude which are situated south of the 58th parallel of south latitude".

The United Kingdom also claimed Victoria Land in 1841 and Enderby Land in 1930. However, all territory between 160°E and 45°E was transferred to Australia (which itself was part of the British Empire and transferred because of this) in 1933. In 1943, at the height of World War II, the UK undertook a military operation known as Operation Tabarin to provide reconnaissance and meteorological information in the South Atlantic Ocean. This secret wartime project became the civilian Falkland Islands Dependencies Survey and later the British Antarctic Survey (BAS). BAS is responsible for most of the United Kingdom's scientific research in Antarctica. In the 1950s, the Antarctic Treaty was negotiated to demilitarise the region and retain Antarctica – defined as all land and ice shelves south of 60°S latitude – for peaceful research purposes. The treaty was negotiated and signed in 1959, and came into effect in 1961.

== Recognition ==
The Antarctic Treaty, signed by all relevant regional claimants, does not in itself either recognise or dispute any territorial claims, leaving this matter to individual signatories. Most of the world's countries do not recognise any national claims to Antarctica. Australia, France, New Zealand, Norway and the United Kingdom, all of whom have territorial claims on the continent, mutually recognise each other's claims. Argentina and Chile dispute the British claim, and have their own claims that overlap both Britain's and each other's (see Argentine Antarctica and Chilean Antarctic Territory).

== Geography ==
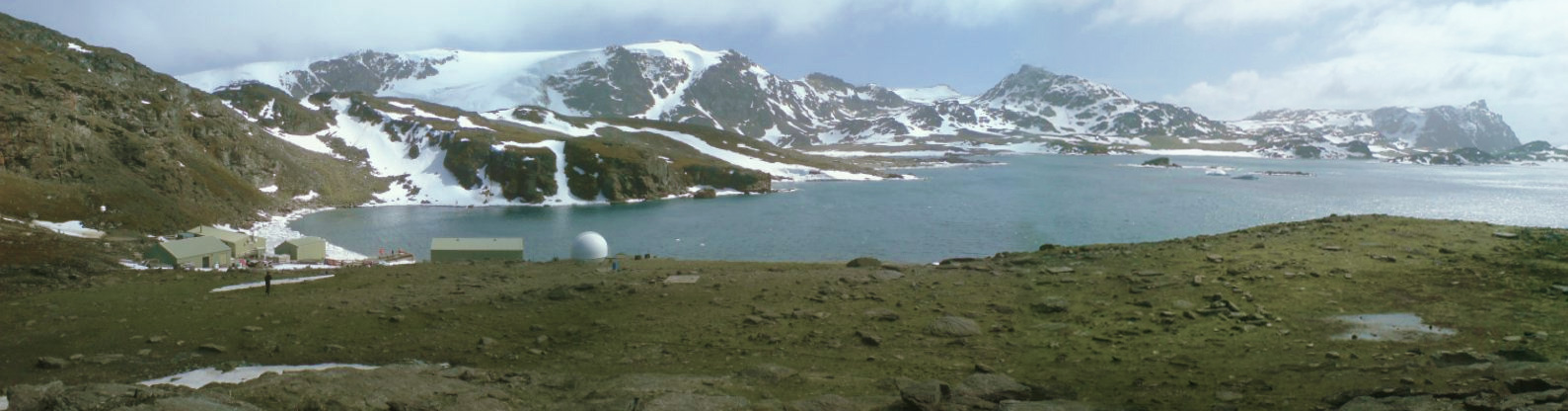
Panorama of Signy Research Station, South Orkney Islands

Map of the British Antarctic Territory

=== Topography ===
The British Antarctic Territory includes the Antarctic Peninsula, the South Shetland Islands, South Orkney Islands and numerous other offshore islands, the Ronne Ice Shelf (Weddell Sea), and parts of Coats Land. A 437,000-square-kilometre (169,000 mi^{2}) triangle of central Antarctica converging on the South Pole was named Queen Elizabeth Land in December 2012, in honour of the Diamond Jubilee of Elizabeth II.

Over 99 per cent of the territory's land surface is covered by a permanent ice sheet, up to about 5,000 metres (16,000 ft) thick. The highest peak in BAT was thought to be Mount Jackson, on the Antarctic Peninsula, at 3,184 metres (10,446 ft). However, in 2017 Mount Hope was calculated to be taller at 3,239 metres (10,627 ft).

=== Wildlife and vegetation ===
There are very few plants in the British Antarctic Territories; most of them are mosses and lichens, but there are also two flowering plants: the Antarctic hairgrass and Antarctic pearlwort.

Many bird species, including seven species of penguin breed in the British Antarctic Territories. The British Antarctic Territories are also home to six species of seals. Other bird species, such as albatross and petrel, may reach the territory.

=== Oil and gas reserves ===
In May 2024, it was reported that Russia had discovered extensive oil and gas reserves in the Antarctic, with a significant portion found in areas claimed by the United Kingdom. The estimated reserves, totaling 511 billion barrels of oil, raise concerns about potential drilling in a region protected by the Antarctic Treaty, which prohibits mineral and oil developments. While the UK's Foreign Office has expressed trust in Russia's assurance of conducting scientific research, critics argue that Russia's activities resemble oil and gas prospecting rather than genuine scientific endeavors and questioned The Foreign Office's management of the United Kingdom's Antarctic interests.

=== Administration ===
King Charles III is the head of state of the British Antarctic Territory.

The British Antarctic Territory is administered by the Foreign and Commonwealth Office (FCO). A Commissioner is appointed and is always the Director of the FCO's Overseas Territories Directorate.

The highest court of appeal of the British Antarctic Territory is the Judicial Committee of the Privy Council. The Territory has a full suite of laws and legal and postal administrations. Given the provisions of the Antarctic Treaty System, the Territory does not enforce its laws on foreign nations who maintain scientific bases within the Territory. It is self-financing, with income from the sale of postage stamps and income tax.

The Royal Navy deploys the ice patrol ship, HMS Protector, in South Atlantic and Antarctic waters during the regional summer. The ship fulfills a variety of roles, including support for the British Antarctic Survey. The British Antarctic Survey also operates the RRS Sir David Attenborough in the region during the Antarctic summer, a ship owned by the Natural Environment Research Council.

== Nationality law ==
The territory is fully a part of the British Overseas Territories for nationality purposes. It is possible to hold British Overseas Territories citizenship (BOTC) by virtue of a connection with the territory. Additionally, since the relevant provisions of the British Overseas Territories Act 2002 came into force on 21 May 2002, a BOTC connected with the territory would also hold British citizenship.

Although this territory's immigration laws would not allow for naturalisation, a person born in the territory before 1983 would hold BOTC (and British citizenship) on that basis. British citizenship and BOTC would also extend to the first generation born overseas. Since Emilio Palma was born in the Antarctic territories claimed by the UK prior to 1983, he automatically had British nationality at birth. Since his parents were both Argentine citizens and he was born at an Argentine base, he was automatically granted Argentine citizenship by the Argentine government.

Changes to British nationality law from 1 January 1983 mean that a child born in the territory can only gain BOTC and/or British citizenship if his/her father or mother holds BOTC and/or British citizenship or if his/her father or mother is "ordinarily resident" in the territory in compliance with the relevant immigration legislation. This effectively prevents any more children born in Argentine or Chilean bases within the area of the British claim being able to claim BOTC or British citizenship by virtue of being born within the territory.

== Research stations ==
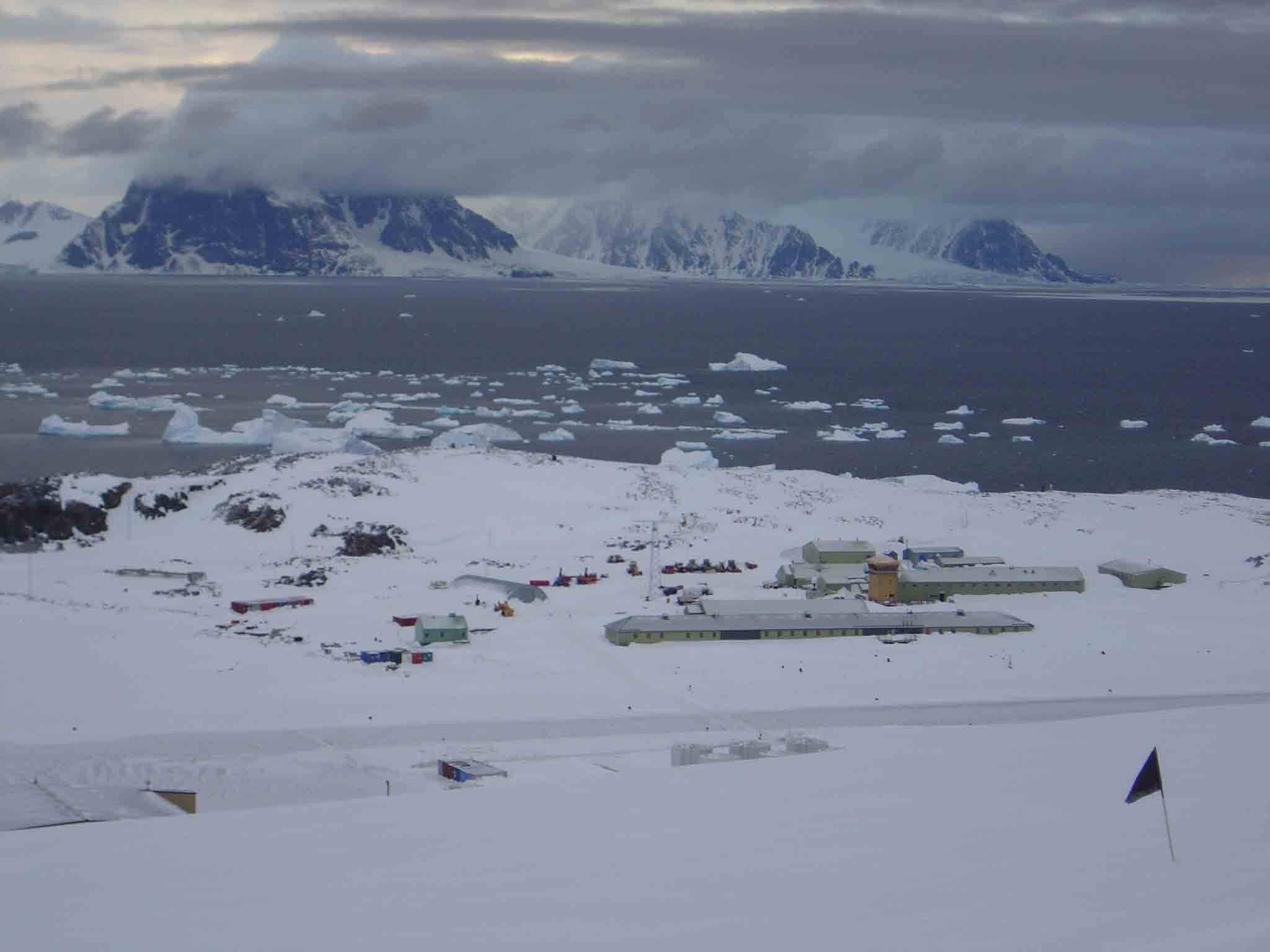
Rothera Research Station

The British Antarctic Survey has two permanently staffed facilities in the Territory: Halley Research Station and Rothera Research Station.

Signy Research Station was operated from 1947 until 1996 and now is only staffed in the summer. There are also two summer-only forward operating stations at Fossil Bluff and Sky Blu. Faraday was maintained until 1996, when it was sold to Ukraine and renamed Akademik Vernadsky Station.

Since 1996, the historic base at Port Lockroy on Goudier Island has been staffed by the UK Antarctic Heritage Trust during the Antarctic summer. Receiving about 10,000 visitors a year, it is one of the most visited sites on the continent. Visitors can tour the museum, buy souvenirs, post mail, and view the large gentoo penguin colony. Argentine presence in the territory dates to the foundation of the Orcadas Base, South Orkney Islands, in 1903. A number of other nations maintain bases in the territory, many in the South Shetland Islands.

== Postage stamps and coins ==
Despite the lack of permanent inhabitants, the British Antarctic Territory issues its own postage stamps. While some are actually used by visiting tourists and resident scientists, the bulk are sold overseas to collectors. The first issue came in 1963, an engraved set with 15 values ranging from ½d to one pound, featuring a portrait of Queen Elizabeth overlooking various scenes of human activity in Antarctica. Several additional issues in the 1960s were followed by a decimalisation issue in 1971 produced by overprinting the 1963 stamps.

In 2008–2009, as part of the celebrations of the centenary of the 1908 British territorial claim, the British Antarctic Territory issued its first ever legal-tender coin.

== Queen Elizabeth Land ==
On 18 December 2012, the Foreign and Commonwealth Office announced that the southern part of the British Antarctic Territory has been named Queen Elizabeth Land in honour of Queen Elizabeth II in her Diamond Jubilee year. The area, the southern third of the territory, has an area of about 437,000 square kilometres (169,000 sq mi) – almost twice the size of the United Kingdom – and is roughly triangular in shape, with the South Pole at one apex and with the 20°W and 80°W lines of longitude forming the eastern and western boundaries. The northern boundary is formed by the Filchner-Ronne Ice Shelf on the west and by Coats Land on the east.

The name "Queen Elizabeth Land" will be used in future on all British maps, but due to the unique status of Antarctica, it will be up to other countries to recognise the name if they see fit. Argentina, which lays claim to part of the area, criticised the naming.

== See also ==
- Australian Antarctic Territory
- British Arctic Territories – 16th century to 1880 and now Canadian Arctic Archipelago
- Hope Bay incident
- Marie Byrd Land
- Princess Elizabeth Land
- Ross Dependency
- Territorial claims in Antarctica
- Tierra del Fuego
